= Metro Transit (Omaha) =

Public transit operator in Omaha, Nebraska, U.S.

Metro
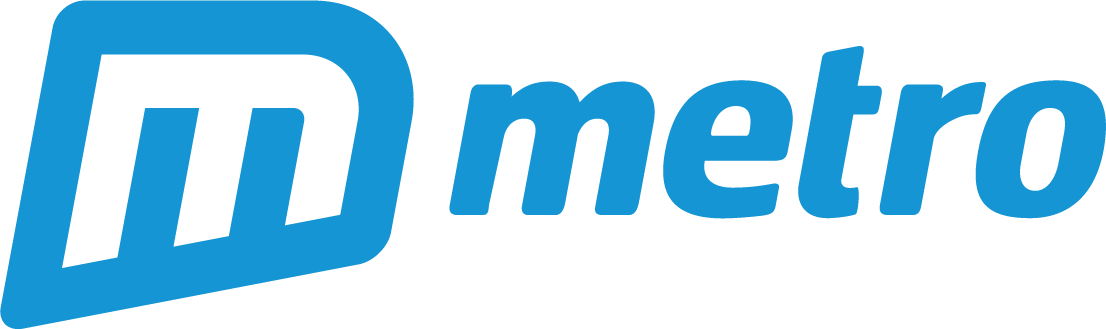

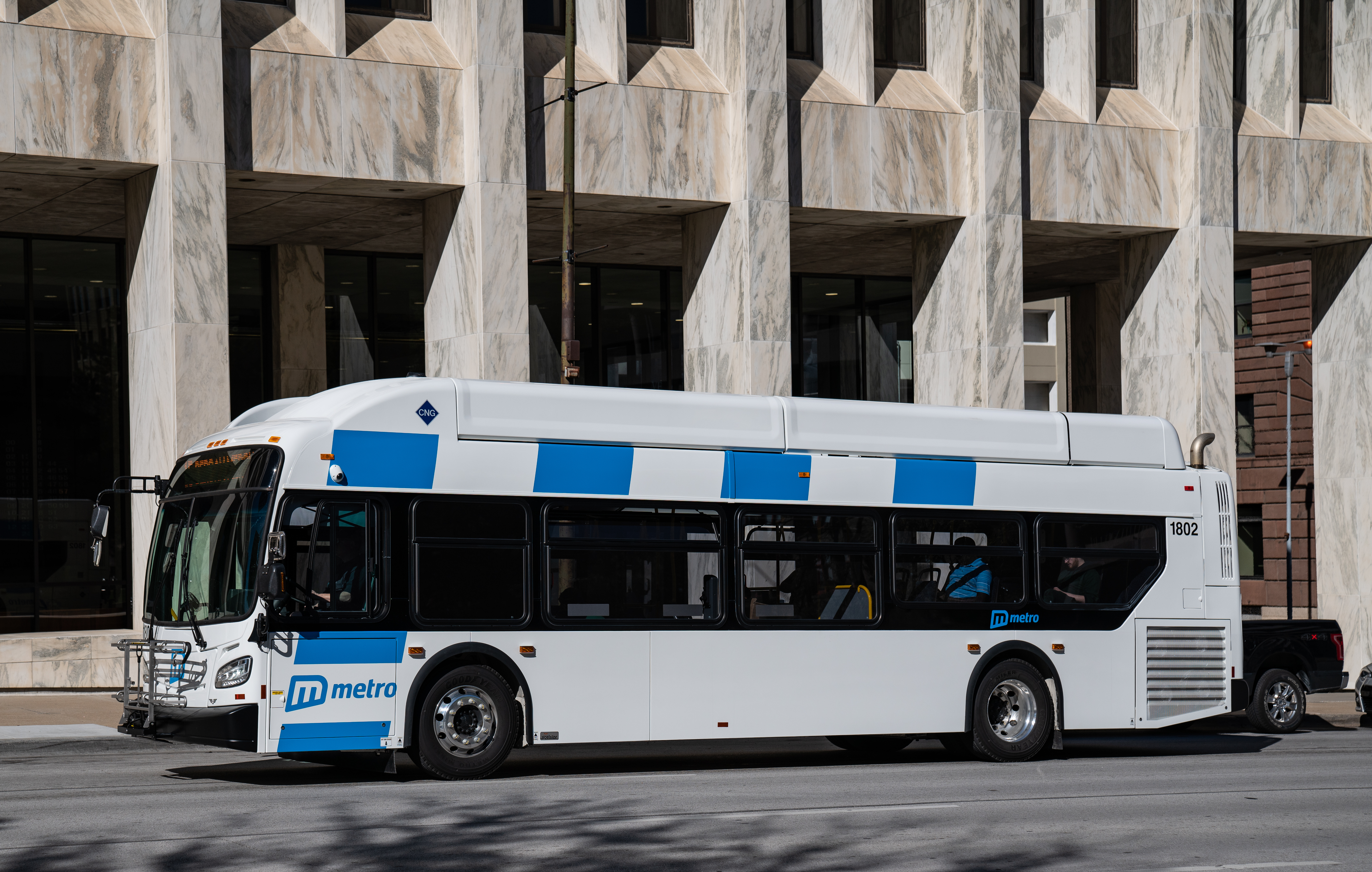
- Metro Transit #1802, a 2018 New Flyer XN35 bus fueled by compressed natural gas.
- Founded: 1972
- Headquarters: 2222 Cuming St., Omaha, Nebraska 68102
- Locale: Omaha, Nebraska, U.S.
- Service area: Omaha–Council Bluffs metropolitan area
- Service type: Bus service, paratransit, park and ride, bus rapid transit, streetcar (proposed)
- Routes: 34
- Fleet: 135 buses
- Fuel type: Diesel, CNG, Electric
- Website: www.ometro.com

Metro Transit, previously known as Metro Area Transit, is an American mass transportation provider for Omaha, Nebraska, United States. Metro currently operates around 135 buses throughout the Omaha–Council Bluffs metropolitan area, including Bellevue, Ralston, La Vista, and Papillion in Nebraska and Council Bluffs in Iowa. Operated by the Omaha Transit Authority, a governmental subdivision of the State of Nebraska, Metro's board consists of a five-member board appointed by the mayor and confirmed by the Omaha City Council and the Douglas County Commissioners.

The agency receives funds from local, state, and federal sources. The city has equipped its buses with bicycle carriers and onboard WiFi. The service hours of the entire system are generally from about 4:30 am–1:00 am on weekdays, 5:00 am-midnight on Saturdays, and 6:00 am–9:30 pm on Sundays, with many routes operating a shorter span. (Some routes operate as rush hour-only, weekday-only, or Monday-Saturday only).

== History ==
Metro Area Transit was formed in mid-1972 by the Omaha Transportation Authority from the takeover of Omaha Transit Co. and City Transit Lines, Inc. of Council Bluffs, Iowa. In early 1974, Metro Area Transit began to expand into Ralston, La Vista, and Papillion. By 1976, funding being with-held from the Transportation Authority threatened the Metro Area Transit from being either greatly reduced or shut down. However, the Department of Labor and Transportation Authority came to an agreement, allowing for additional grants for operating.

In 2002, Metro began restoring old buses into, "retro buses," for use in the system. The buses were built in the 1940s and 1950s. In August 2010, Metro Area Transit officially rebranded to Metro Transit. Additionally, 24 fuel efficient buses were introduced to the system.

== Services ==
=== ORBT, Omaha Rapid Bus Transit ===
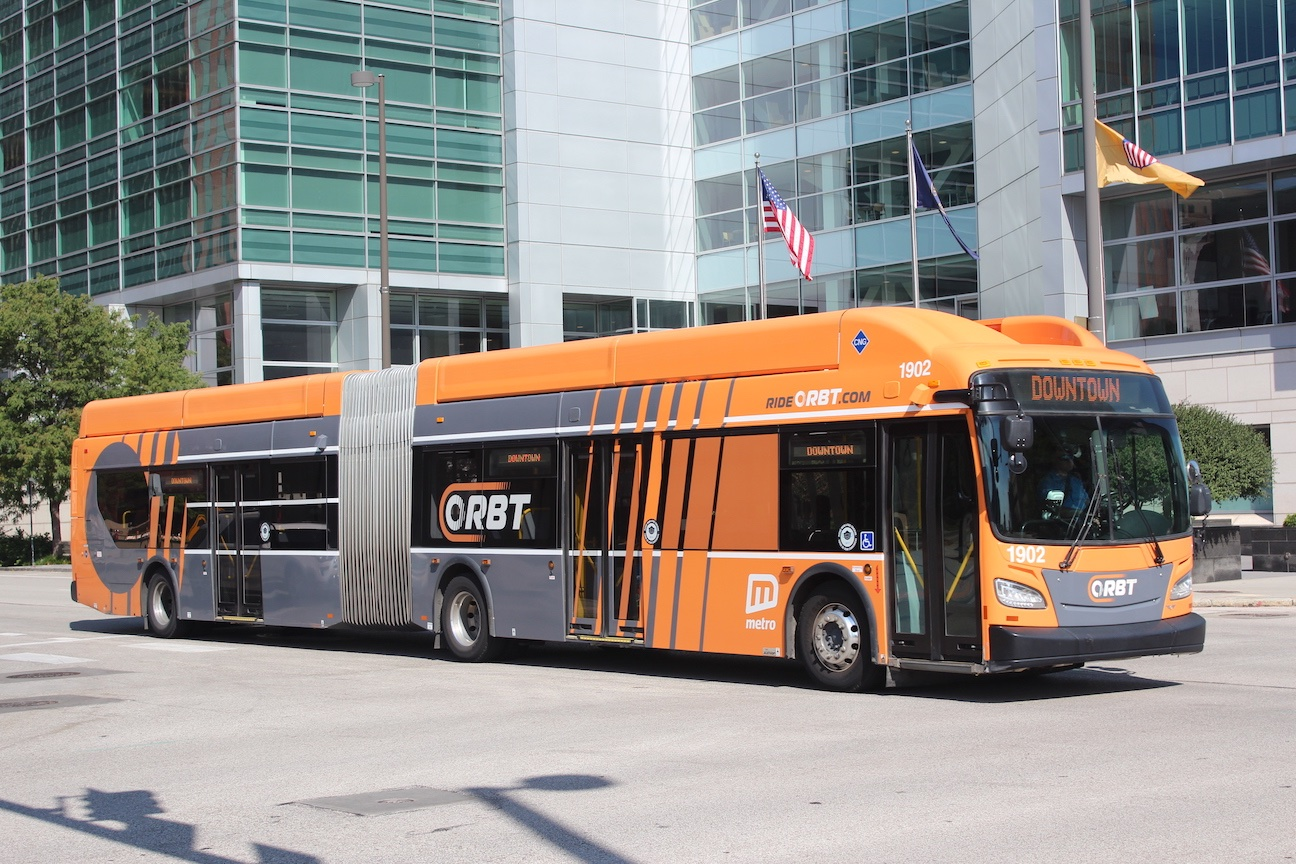
New Flyer XN60 CNG-fueled articulated bus used for the ORBT line.

Planning for a bus rapid transit system in Omaha was listed as a priority by Regional Transit Vision as early as 2013. Work began after a $15 million TIGER grant was awarded to Omaha by the Federal Transit Administration. Metro Transit unveiled the ORBT brand in August 2017. Construction commenced in late 2018 and ORBT service began in fall 2020.

=== MetroNEXT ===
Announced by Metro Transit on February 25, 2021, MetroNEXT is a public initiative to determine what direction Metro Transit should take in developing the existing public transit network. For some time, public input was accepted, and Metro Transit made further development into the MetroNEXT initiative. As a result, in late March 2021, round one of the initiative included a rough understanding of the individual communities and landscape that may limit service expansion and frequency. Round 2, held from mid-November to early December 2021, to frame the future of the transit network. Round 3 and 4 have yet to be held as of November 2021, but it is planned to occur in early 2022. The final plan was authorized in April 2022 by the Metro board. On June 23, 2022, Metro announced a decision to transform the authority into a Regional Transit Authority to help implement the MetroNEXT Plan.

=== Metro Flex ===
In August 2025, Metro Flex, an on-demand microtransit, service was launched to address the "first and last mile problem" by connecting residents to the fixed-route bus network. Operating with a fleet of eighteen new vans, the service functions similarly to ridesharing apps, allowing users to book a ride through the "Metro Flex OMA" application. This service transports passengers from their location to a bus route or any other destination within the same zone, with a guarantee of available wheelchair-accessible vehicles. According to Metro Transit CEO Lauren Cencic, the initiative is intended to fill gaps within the existing transit system and expand to meet the community's evolving needs. The service was offered for free for the first two months, with a fare of $3 or $4.25 per ride implemented after October 15.

== Transit Centers ==
Transit Centers in Omaha are an important part of Metro's system. Since 2006, many transit centers have been built or removed. Those removed were the Crossroads Transit Center in 2006, the Stockyards Transit Center in South Omaha which was replaced by Metro College Transit Center in 2007 and the Benson Park Transit Center in 2020. Others added were the Westroads Transit Center near Westroads Mall. Two other major meeting places recently upgraded to transit Center status are the Aksarben Transit Center in south central Omaha, and 76th Street Transit Center near Crossroads Mall. Both are not currently equipped with all of the amenities typically expected of a transit center, but are planned for upgrade. As of December 2012, Omaha's most used transit center, North Omaha Transit Center, has been rebuilt. Currently being phased out as construction nears, a new Downtown Transit Center is planned for the area.

=== Current Transit Centers (2022) ===
- Aksarben Transit Center - This transit center is located at 6801 Mercy Road and consists of two shelters with benches and bike racks serving 5 routes. The center opened on January 20, 2019, replacing the former Bergan Mercy Transit Center.
- North Omaha Transit Center - This transit center is located at 4308 North 30th Street and consists of 14 bus bays with a covered platform and indoor waiting area serving 10 routes.
- South Omaha Transit Center - This transit center is located at 2801 Babe Gomez Boulevard and consists of 8 bus bays serving 5 routes.
- Westroads Transit Center - This transit center is located at 1099 N 102nd Street and consists of 6 covered bus bays serving 5 routes.

== Fleet ==
Fleet number(s)	Photo	Model Year	Manufacturer	Model	Powertrain	Notes
1001-1010		2010	Gillig	Low Floor 40'	Cummins ISL9 EPA10; Voith D864.5	
1011-1024		2010	Gillig	Low Floor 35'	Cummins ISL9 EPA10; Voith D864.5	
1101-1104		2011	New Flyer	D35LFR	Cummins ISL9 EPA10; Voith D864.5	
1105-1109		2011	New Flyer	D40LFR	Cummins ISL9 EPA10; Voith D864.5	
1301-1308		2013	New Flyer	XD35	Cummins ISL9 EPA13; Voith D864.5	
1401-1410		2014	New Flyer	XD35	Cummins ISL9 EPA13; Voith D864.5	
1501		2014	New Flyer	MD30	Cummins ISB6.7 EPA13; Allison B300R	
1502-1505		2015	New Flyer	MD30	Cummins ISB6.7 EPA13; Allison B300R	
1801-1814		2019 (built in 2018)	New Flyer	XN35	Cummins Westport L9N EPA17; Voith D864.6	First compressed natural gas buses in Omaha Metro Transit fleet.
1815-1819		2019 (built in 2018)	New Flyer	XD35	Cummins L9 EPA17; Voith D864.6	
1820-1835		2018	Alexander Dennis	Enviro200 35'	Cummins L9 EPA17; Allison B300R	
1836-1840		2018	Alexander Dennis	Enviro200 30'	Cummins B6.7 EPA17; Allison B300R	
1901-1910		2020	New Flyer	XN60	Cummins Westport L9N EPA17; Voith D864.6	Articulated buses used for the ORBT line.
2051-2061		2021	New Flyer	XN35	Cummins Westport L9N EPA17; Allison B400R	
2121-2123		2022 (built in 2021)	New Flyer	XE40	Siemens ELFA2	First electric buses in Omaha Metro Transit fleet.
2501-2505		2025	New Flyer	XD40	Cummins L9 EPA24; Voith	26 buses ordered by Omaha Metro Transit in June 2024 to replace aging buses.
2506-2509		2025	New Flyer	XD35	Cummins L9 EPA24; Voith	26 buses ordered by Omaha Metro Transit in June 2024 to replace aging buses.
2510-2520		2025	New Flyer	XN40	Cummins Westport L9N EPA24; Voith	26 buses ordered by Omaha Metro Transit in June 2024 to replace aging buses.
2521-2526		2026	New Flyer	XN35	Cummins Westport L9N EPA24; Voith	26 buses ordered by Omaha Metro Transit in June 2024 to replace aging buses.

== Fixed Route Ridership ==
The ridership and service statistics shown here are of fixed route services only and do not include demand response. Per capita statistics are based on the Omaha urbanized area as reported in NTD data. Starting in 2011, 2010 census numbers replace the 2000 census numbers to calculate per capita statistics.

	Ridership	Change	Ridership per capita
2002	3,457,539	n/a	5.52
2003	3,253,923	▼5.89%	5.19
2004	3,209,735	▼1.36%	5.12
2005	3,297,973	▲2.75%	5.26
2006	3,599,193	▲9.13%	5.74
2007	3,710,238	▲3.09%	5.92
2008	3,947,938	▲6.41%	6.3
2009	3,675,281	▼6.9%	5.87
2010	3,746,554	▲1.94%	5.98
2011	4,000,853	▲6.79%	5.52
2012	4,225,033	▲5.6%	5.83
2013	4,178,318	▼1.11%	5.76
2014	4,043,609	▼3.22%	5.58
2015	3,780,469	▼6.51%	5.21
2016	3,623,071	▼4.16%	5.0
2017	3,592,502	▼0.84%	4.96
2018	3,409,221	▼5.1%	4.7
2019	3,267,845	▼4.15%	4.51
2020	2,127,352	▼34.9%	2.93
2021	2,084,221	▼2.03%	2.87
2022	2,634,015	▲26.38%	3.63

== See also ==
- Transportation in Omaha
- List of bus transit systems in the United States
