= Embark (transit authority) =

Public transit authority for the Oklahoma City metropolitan area

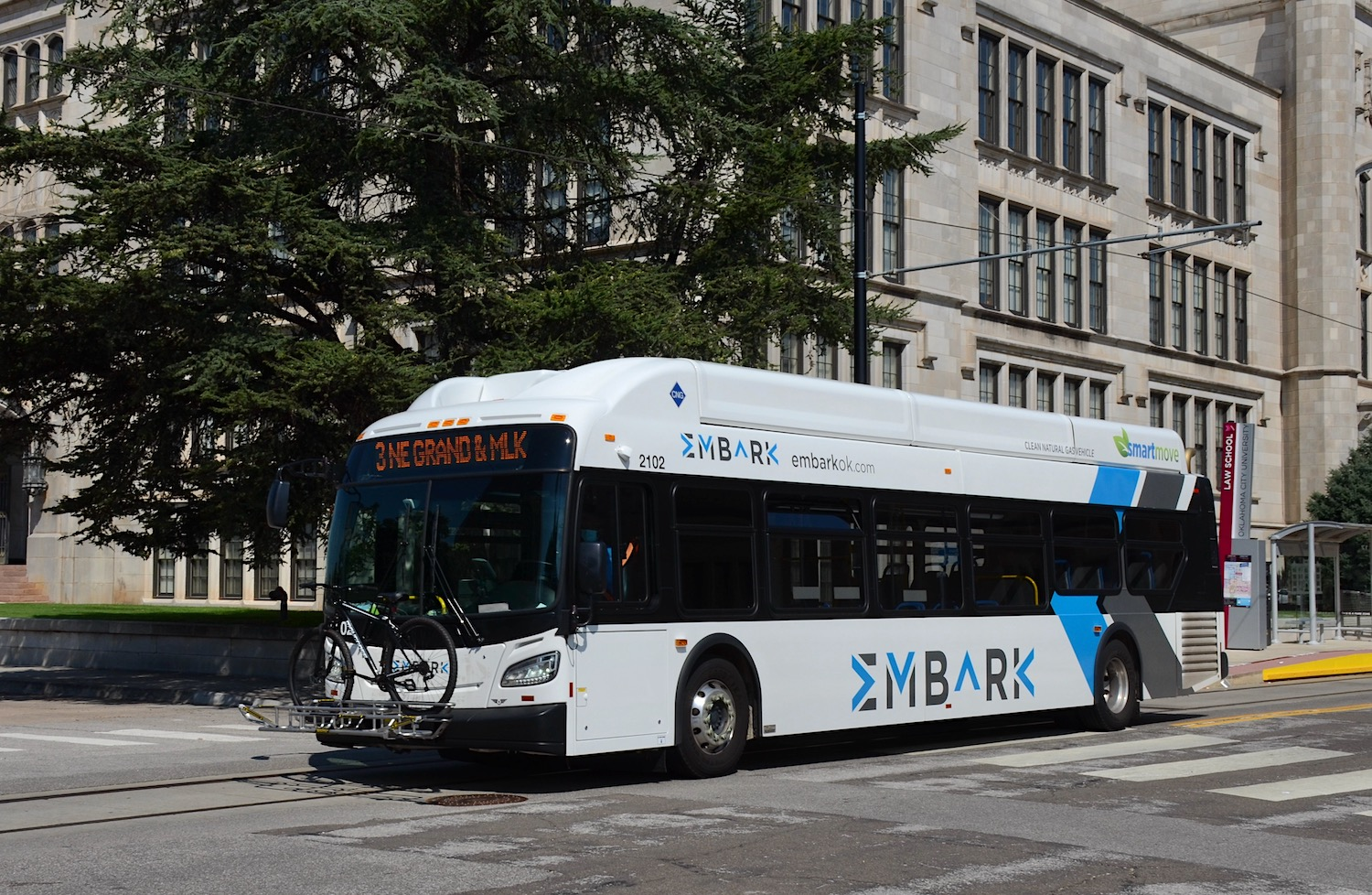
- Embark bus 2102, a 2021-built New Flyer compressed natural gas bus
- Parent: Central Oklahoma Transportation and Parking Authority
- Founded: 1966 (from 1992 as Metro Transit, from 2014 as Embark)
- Headquarters: 2000 S. May Ave, Oklahoma City, Oklahoma, U.S.
- Locale: Oklahoma City
- Service area: Oklahoma City metropolitan area
- Service type: Transit bus, Paratransit, trolley, tram
- Routes: Bus: 22; Streetcar: 2
- Hubs: 2
- Stations: 1
- Fleet: 71 (2024)
- Daily ridership: 12,700 (weekdays, Q2 2026)
- Annual ridership: 3,228,400 (2025)
- Fuel type: Diesel, CNG, Electric
- Chief executive: Jason Ferbrache
- Website: embarkok.com

Embark (styled in all caps as EMBARK) is a public transit agency in Oklahoma City, Oklahoma. Operated by the Central Oklahoma Transportation and Parking Authority (COTPA), Embark is the largest transit agency in the state and operates services throughout the Oklahoma City metropolitan area.

EMBARK operates bus and paratransit service in Oklahoma City and Norman (including an express bus connecting the two cities), the Oklahoma City Streetcar, Rapid bus rapid transit service, public parking and bike shares in Downtown Oklahoma City, and ferry service on the Oklahoma River. It also provides administrative and executive support for the Regional Transportation Authority of Central Oklahoma.

In 2025, the system had a ridership of 3,228,400, or about 12,700 per weekday as of the second quarter of 2026.

== History ==
The Central Oklahoma Transportation and Parking Authority was established on February 1, 1966, by the Oklahoma City Council to continue transit service as private operator Oklahoma Transportation Company, which provided bus service to the community, as City Bus Company, had announced it would discontinue transit service due to low ridership. There were initially only 18 buses, all leased from the Oklahoma Transportation Company (OTC).

The system was rebranded as MassTrans in 1975 and used that name until 1992, when it was rebranded as Metro Transit, though the official name remains in use as well.

COTPA was reorganized in 1989, when the city established a Transit Services division to provide senior management through an inter-local operating agreement. COTPA also purchased the historic Union Station in Downtown Oklahoma City, which served as an administrative office until 2022.

Embark previously operated "Oklahoma Spirit Trolleys", a trolley-replica bus network from 1999 to 2020.

Oklahoma City's downtown transit center at N.W. 4th St. and Hudson Ave. opened to customers in 2004 after the previous transit hub was demolished to make way for construction of the Paycom Center.

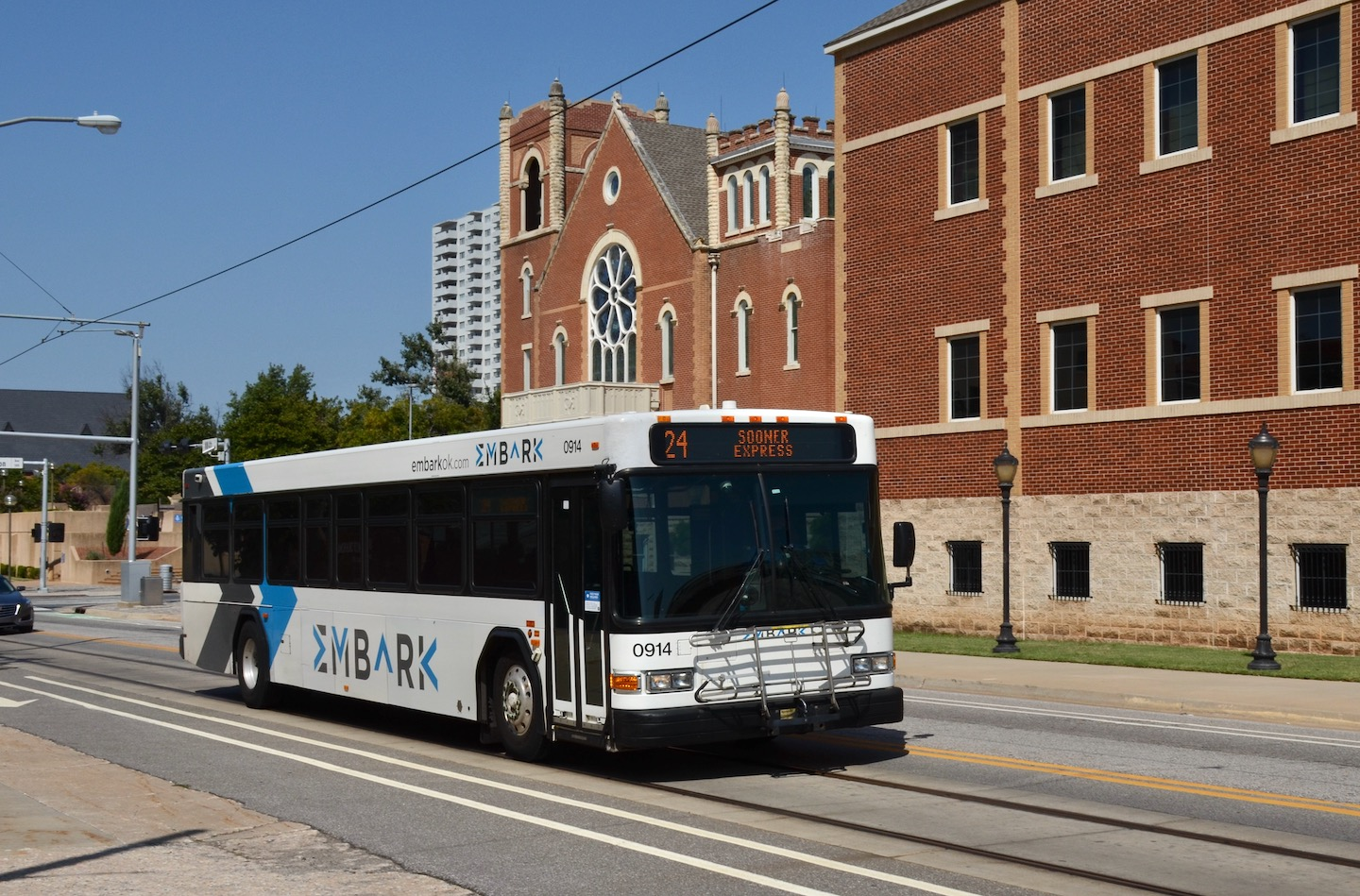
A 2009 Gillig Low Floor bus, repainted for the change from Metro to Embark, in service in 2021.

In September 2013, it was announced that Metro Transit would change its name to Embark, effective April 28, 2014, and include a new bus route system.

On October 15, 2015, Embark announced that it would begin offering free Wi-Fi on all buses, on all routes.

In August 2016, Embark received the award for "North America's Outstanding Public Transportation System" by the American Public Transportation Association for systems providing fewer than 4 million annual passenger trips.

In December 2018, Embark began operation of Oklahoma City Streetcar, the state's only modern streetcar system, which services a nearly five-mile route in the urban core.

On January 27, 2019, Sunday bus service was implemented for the first time in Oklahoma City public transportation history, utilizing the same operational routes and schedules as maintained on Saturdays. On Monday, September 2, 2019 (Labor Day), Embark buses began operating on all major holidays, resulting in the area's public transportation service operating 365 days a year for the first time; the authority utilizes the same schedule and active routes used on weekends during major holidays.

In late 2019, Embark assumed operation of Cleveland Area Rapid Transit's non-campus service, which consisted of seven bus routes and paratransit in Norman. In 2023, Embark opened a new transit center in downtown Norman and redesigned the Norman route network.

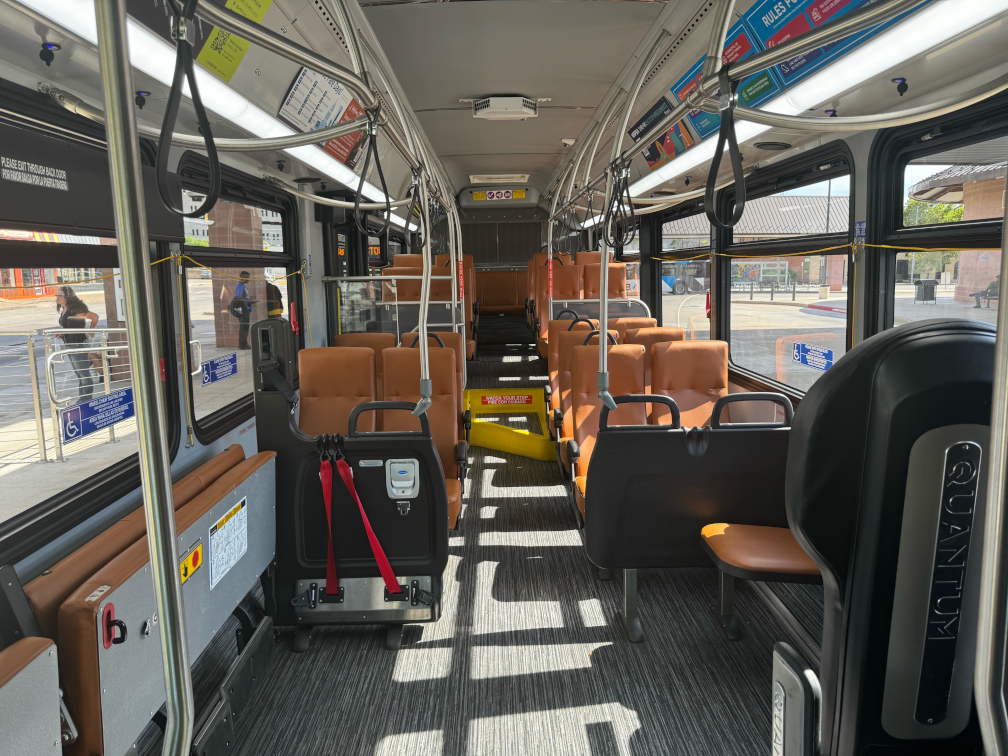
Interior of a 2022 New Flyer XN40 bus used for the Rapid NW BRT service.

In 2022, Embark broke ground on construction of Rapid NW (stylized as RAPID NW), Oklahoma City's first Bus Rapid Transit route. Service opened on December 3, 2023.

== Fares ==
As of August 2026, single-ride fares in Oklahoma City are $1.75 for standard buses (including Rapid) and $3 for express buses. Daily, weekly, and monthly passes, which can be used on both types of buses, are available. Bus passes do not include ferry service, which has a separate $12 daily pass. The Oklahoma City Streetcar is free to ride.

Elderly and disabled patrons may apply for a reduced-fare pass, which allows them to buy all fares at half price (except for single-ride bus passes, which are reduced further to $0.75). Additionally, patrons under the age of 18 may apply for a Haul Pass, which allows unlimited free rides.

All bus routes in Norman (except the express route between Oklahoma City and Norman) are free to ride due to a partnership with the Norman municipal government.

== Services ==
=== Oklahoma City bus ===
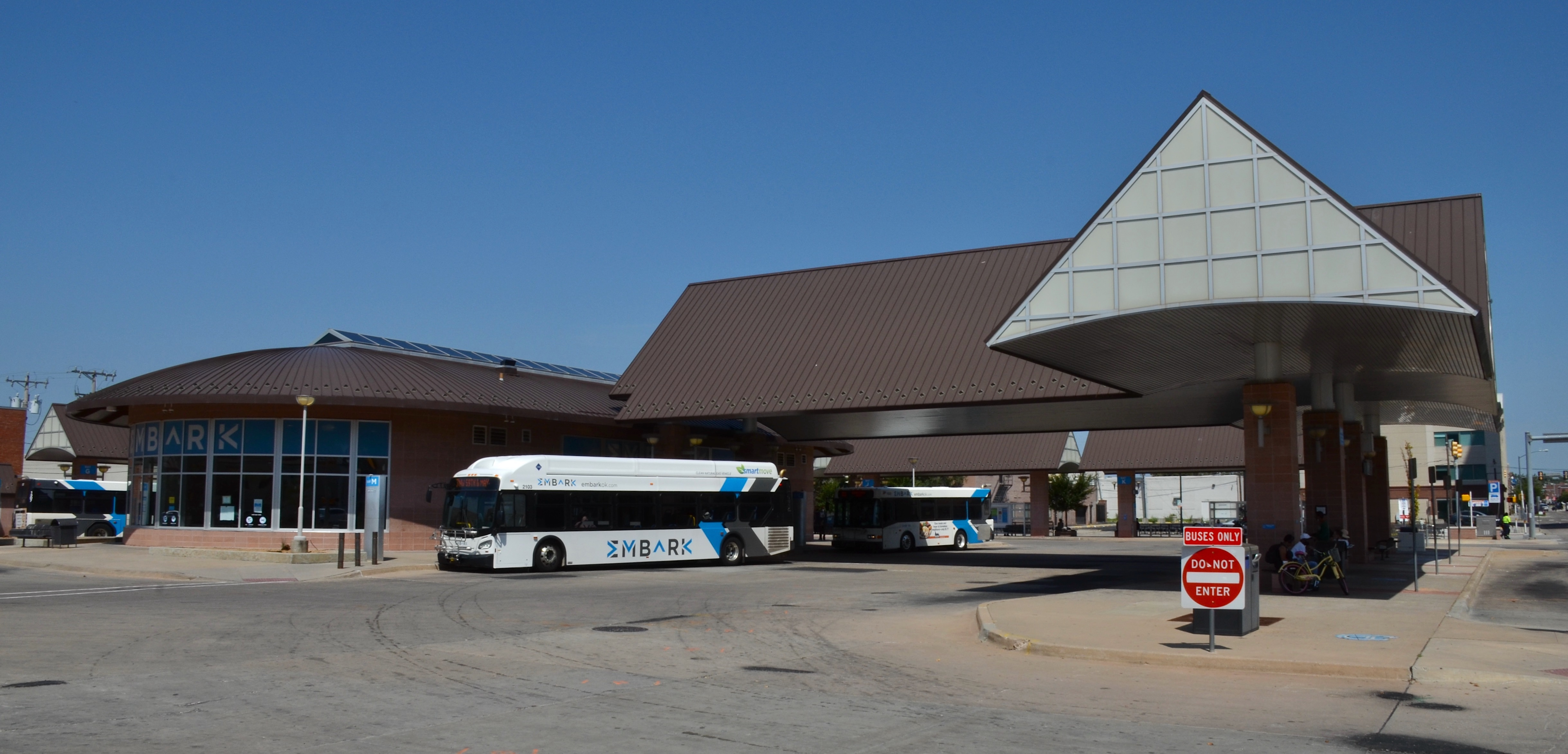
Embark Transit Center, located at NW 4th and Hudson (2021)

As of October 2026, Embark operates 18 bus routes in the Oklahoma City area. Embark service is primarily located within Oklahoma City limits, though two routes serve the eastern suburbs of Spencer and Midwest City.

Most routes run daily, with 30-60 minute headways on weekdays and 45-60 minute headways on weekends. Night service is available on five routes. Embark operates a central transit center in downtown Oklahoma City, which serves as a transfer point for most routes and a customer service center.

==== Rapid ====
Rapid bus in Downtown Oklahoma City (2025)

Rapid (stylized in all-caps as RAPID) is a bus rapid transit service operated by Embark. Rapid services specially-designed larger stations and utilizes transit signal priority to ensure faster trips. Rapid operates seven days per week with 12-30 minute headways.

The service currently consists of one line, Rapid NW (route 200), which travels from the Embark Transit Center in Downtown Oklahoma City along Classen Boulevard and Northwest Expressway (SH-3) to a park-and-ride lot at the intersection of Meridian Avenue and SH-3. The line travels 9.5 miles (15.3 km) and services 32 stops (16 each way).

Another Rapid line in northeast and southern Oklahoma City is planned as part of the MAPS 4 project.

==== Link ====
An unusual aspect of Embark was the Link program, which is a combination of owl service and paratransit service. Since regularly scheduled routes operate only until about 8pm local time, and not at all Sundays, Link provides nominally fixed route service from 7 pm until 12 midnight Monday through Saturday, and Sunday from 7 am until 7 pm. The four routes may however, deviate by as much as three-quarters of a mile from the fixed route if the customer notifies Embark by 4 pm the day before (or by 12 noon Saturday for Monday service). An additional fee will be charged in that instance, but customers using the fixed stops will be charged the normal fare. Link was discontinued in April 2014 as Embark began extending hours on five routes (see below), as well as adding Sunday and holiday service on most bus routes in 2019.

=== Norman bus ===
Since 2019, Embark has operated fixed-route bus service in the city of Norman. As of 2023, Embark operates five routes throughout the city, which run Monday through Saturday with 30-60 minute headways depending on the route. Embark also operates two express routes in Norman: weekday service to downtown Oklahoma City and twice-weekly service to a Social Security Administration office in Moore.

All bus routes in Norman, including express routes, operate out of a dedicated transit center in downtown Norman. Non-express routes in the city are free to ride due to a partnership with the Norman municipal government.

=== Plus paratransit ===
Per ADA regulations, Embark offers paratransit service (dubbed "Embark Plus") to qualified riders with disabilities that inhibit their ability to utilize Embark's bus systems. Service is available within Oklahoma City and Norman's city limits, as well as any area within 3/4 mile (1.2 km) of a bus route. Rides must be scheduled 1-7 days in advance, with a cost of $3.50-10.50 depending on the distance from existing bus routes.

=== Oklahoma City Streetcar ===
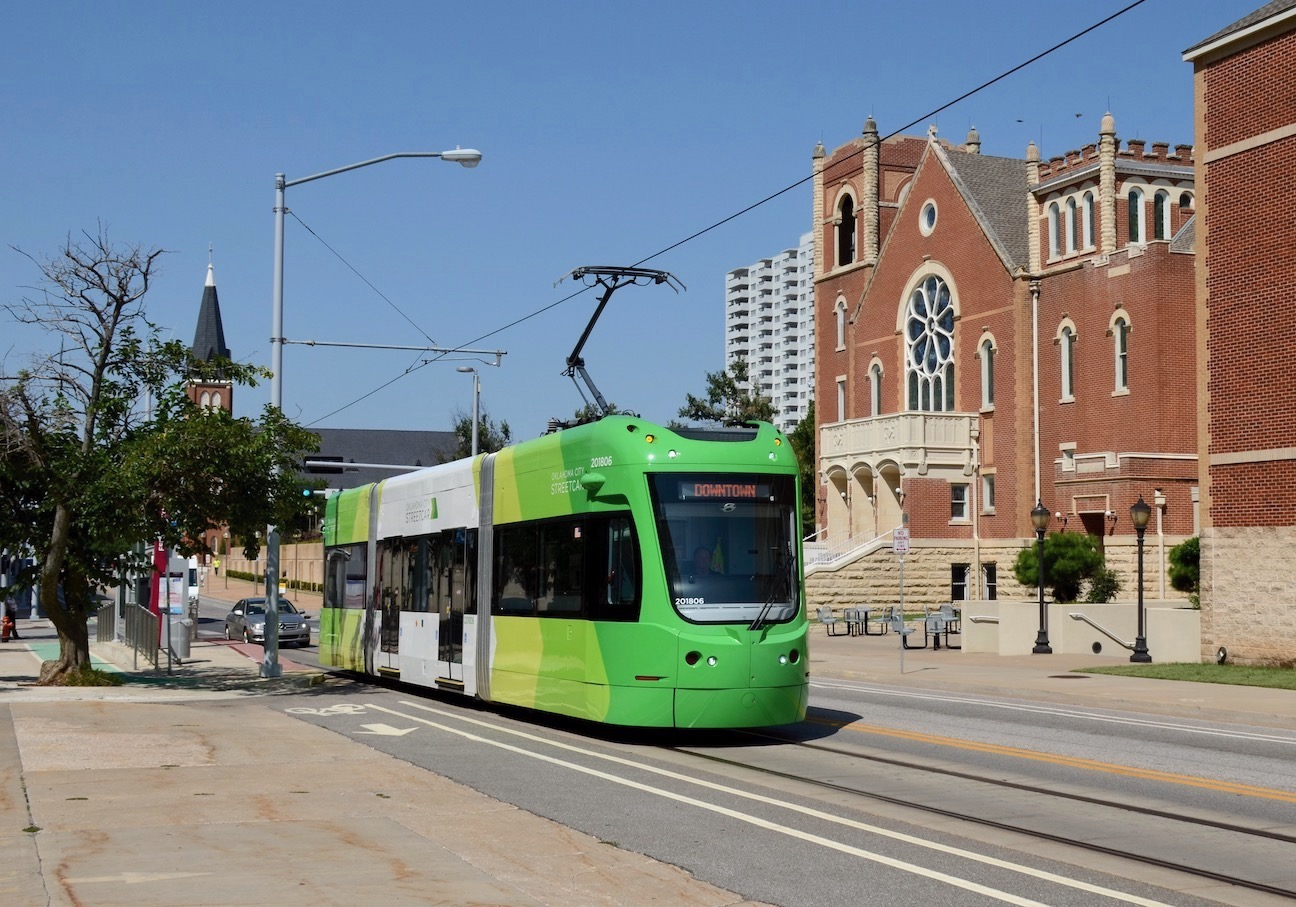
Streetcar at 4th and Robinson (2021)

The Oklahoma City Streetcar is a 4.8-mile (7.7 km) modern streetcar line which serves Downtown Oklahoma City. Service consists of two routes: the Downtown Loop, which serves all 22 stations (including the Embark Transit Center), and the Bricktown Loop, which only serves the 9 stations in Bricktown. The streetcar operates daily with 15-to-18-minute headways.

As of August 2026, the streetcar is free to ride, following a successful six-month pilot program earlier in the year.

=== Oklahoma River Cruises ===
Embark operates Oklahoma River Cruises, a ferry service on the Oklahoma River, which provides public service seasonally from April to November. The service operates six landings: Meridian Avenue, Stockyards City, Exchange Avenue, Bricktown, Regatta Park, and the First Americans Museum.

=== Spokies bike share ===
Embark has operated Spokies, a bike share program in downtown Oklahoma City, since 2014. The program allows riders to check out bikes from docking stations, with cost based on the duration of their rental. Its fleet consists of 113 bicycles, 53 of which are electric bikes.

=== Parking ===
Embark operates four public parking garages in downtown Oklahoma City, totaling 3,700 spaces, as well as parking meters for on-street parking. Garage parking fare includes two day passes for use on Rapid (and, formerly, the Oklahoma City Streetcar).

== Fleet ==
As of early 2024, the Embark OKC fleet consists of 71 buses: 62 fixed-route buses and nine Rapid BRT buses. The fleet consists of 58% CNG buses, 37% diesel buses, 2% hybrid buses and 3% electric buses, with a goal to become 100% alternative-fueled fleet by 2025. The fleet has an average age of 7.7 years (revenue), with an average of 367,386 lifetime miles per vehicle. Much of the current Embark fleet can be referenced in the table below.

Fleet number(s)	Photo	Model Year	Manufacturer	Model	Engine	Notes
0901-0913		2009	Gillig	Low Floor 35'	Cummins ISL EPA07	
1101-1107		2011	Gillig	Low Floor 35'	Cummins ISL9 EPA10	
1301-1306		2012	Gillig	Low Floor 29'	Cummins ISL9 EPA10	
1307-1310		2012	Gillig	Low Floor 35'	Cummins ISL9 EPA10	
1311-1312		2013	Gillig	Low Floor 40'	Cummins ISL9 EPA13	
1313-1316		2014	Gillig	Low Floor 40'	Cummins ISL9 EPA13	
1601-1606		2016	New Flyer	XN40	Cummins Westport ISL G EPA13	
1701-1711		2017	New Flyer	XN40	Cummins Westport L9N EPA17	
2000		2020	New Flyer	XE35		First electric bus in Embark fleet.
2002-2003		2020	New Flyer	XN40	Cummins Westport L9N EPA17	
2102-2109		2021	New Flyer	XN40	Cummins Westport L9N EPA21	
2200		2022	New Flyer	XE40		
2201-2207		2022	New Flyer	XN40	Cummins Westport L9N EPA21	
2220-2228		2023	New Flyer	XN40	Cummins Westport L9N EPA21	Used for the Rapid NW BRT service.
2501-2503		2024	New Flyer	XN40	Cummins Westport L9N EPA24	
2504-2506		2025	Gillig	Low Floor Plus CNG 35'	Cummins Westport L9N EPA24	

== See also ==
- List of bus transit systems in the United States
- Oklahoma City Streetcar
- Santa Fe Depot (Oklahoma City)
