= Lawrence Transit =

Municipal transit system for Lawrence Kansas

Lawrence Transit System
- Parent: City of Lawrence and the University of Kansas
- Founded: 2000
- Headquarters: 1260 Timberedge Rd, Lawrence, KS 66049
- Locale: Lawrence, Kansas
- Service type: bus service, paratransit
- Routes: 20 between the city and university systems
- Annual ridership: 936,320 (2024)
- Fuel type: Diesel, Hybrid, Electric, Gasoline
- Operator: Transdev
- Website: lawrencetransit.org

The Lawrence Transit System is the municipal public transportation agency in Lawrence, Kansas. It is a coordinated transit system with the City of Lawrence and the University of Kansas, operating Monday through Saturday from 6 a.m. to 8 p.m. on most routes. On election days, rides are free of charge.

== Bus Routes ==
Lawrence Transit operates nine routes (1-9) using Lawrence Transit-branded vehicles, which are shown in the route list below. In addition to these routes, there are twelve University of Kansas routes in Lawrence, Kansas (11, 12, 30, 34, 36, 38, 41, 42, 43, 44, 45 and 53) operated using KU-branded vehicles. Most of these routes only operate while KU is in session during the Fall and Spring semesters at KU. Connections to Johnson County Transit Route 510 (K-10 Connector) as well as Greyhound are available at the Central Station.

=== Route list ===
№	Termini		Via	Notes
1	Downtown	East Hills	Massachusetts St, 23rd St	Interlined with Route 5
2	Central Station	Lakeview Rd	6th St, LMH	Interlined with Route 3
3	Downtown	Lakeview Rd	9th St, LMH	Interlined with Route 2
4	Downtown	Wakarusa Dr & 6th St	Central Station, KU Campus	
5	Central Station	East Hills	23rd St, HINU	Interlined with Route 1
6	Rock Chalk Park	North Lawrence	6th St, Downtown	
7	Downtown	South Iowa St	Haskell Ave, 27th St	Interlined with Route 9
8	Central Station	Peaslee Tech	KU Campus, HINU	
9	Central Station	South Iowa St	Clinton Pkwy, Lawrence Ave	Interlined with Route 7

== ADA Services ==
The Lawrence Transit System offers paratransit services (T Lift) to serve the needs of riders who, because of a disability, are unable to use the Lawrence Transit System fixed-route system, and who meet the criteria established by the U.S. Department of Transportation under the Americans With Disabilities Act (ADA) of 1990. The JayLift provides ADA services for KU students, staff and faculty who are permanently or temporarily disabled to get to class or class-related activities.

== On-Demand Services ==
A late-night service (Night Line) started June 1, 2013 and provides curb-to-curb, shared ride bus service from 8:00 p.m. to 6:00 a.m. Monday – Saturday anywhere within Lawrence. The rides must be scheduled in advance, 8:00 a.m. – 5:00 p.m Monday – Saturday. Each ride costs $2.00.

A new, fare-free On Demand service launched in 2023, running from 8 p.m. to 6 a.m. Monday-Friday and 8 p.m. to midnight on Saturdays. In January 2024, this service was expanded to Sundays as well, and Saturday hours were extended to 8 p.m. to 6 a.m. Trips can be booked using the Lawrence Transit On Demand app, which allows riders to book single trips or multiple reservations at once up to five days in advance.

== Policy Makers ==
Lawrence Transit System is a service of the City of Lawrence. Policies for Lawrence Transit system are set by the Lawrence City Commission, with recommendations for the Public Transit Advisory Committee. The University of Kansas Transit Commission, composed of faculty, staff and students, is responsible for campus transportation services; KU on Wheels, JayLift and SafeRide.

== Fleet ==
Lawrence Transit currently operates a fleet largely composed of Gillig transit buses, along with a number of Ford cutaway buses for lower-ridership routes. In 2020, 2021, and 2022, Lawrence Transit was awarded three consecutive federal grants for electric buses, with the first five units deployed in 2022. Two Gillig BEBs were received in January 2024 and two electric low-floor cutaway buses from Optimal Electric Vehicles were deployed in 2025 on interlined routes 2 and 3. In 2024, the Lawrence Transit fleet was updated with a new livery featuring a modernized Lawrence Transit logo, the Phoenix Flame graphic representing the City of Lawrence, as well as denoting special features such as Electric, Hybrid, and On Demand. Much of the current Lawrence Transit fleet can be referenced in the table below.

Fleet number(s)	Photo	Model Year	Manufacturer	Model	Powertrain	Notes
600-604		2022	Gillig	Low Floor Plus EV 40'		Livery designed by David Gnojek.
605-606		2023	Gillig	Low Floor Plus EV 40'		Livery designed by Iris Cliff.
607-608		2024	Ford	E-450		Optimal Electric Vehicles S1 cutaway buses built on Ford E-450 chassis.; Livery designed by Tokeya Richardson.
809-813		2021 (built in 2020)	Ford	E-450		
814-815		2023 (built in 2022)	Ford	E-450		
900-902		2011	Gillig	Low Floor HEV 40'	Cummins ISL9	901 is retired.
906-907		2015	Gillig	Low Floor 29'	Cummins ISL9	
908		2015	Gillig	Low Floor HEV 29'	Cummins ISL9	
909-911		2020	Gillig	Low Floor 29'	Cummins L9	
944-945		2009	Gillig	Low Floor 35'	Cummins ISL9	Former KU on Wheels buses.
946-947		2012	Gillig	Low Floor 40'	Cummins ISL9	Former KU on Wheels buses.

== Fixed route ridership ==
The ridership statistics shown here are of fixed route services only and do not include demand response services.

== See also ==
- Lawrence station
- List of bus transit systems in the United States
