= Embark Rapid =

Bus rapid transit service in Oklahoma City, Oklahoma, United States

RAPID

- A RAPID bus in downtown Oklahoma City

Overview
- System: Embark (transit authority)
- Vehicle: New Flyer CNG Xcelsior
- Began service: December 3, 2023

Route
- Locale: Oklahoma City, Oklahoma
- Start: Meridian & Expressway
- End: Embark Transit Center
- Length: 9.5 miles (15.3 km)
- Stations: 32

Service
- Frequency: Monday-Friday: 12 minutes Saturday-Sunday: 15 minutes
- Ridership: 1,400/day (2026)

RAPID is a bus rapid transit (BRT) service in Oklahoma City, Oklahoma, United States. It is operated by Embark and serves a 9.5 miles (15.3 km) corridor running northwest from downtown Oklahoma City. Planning for the project began in earnest in 2018 with a federal grant, with full service beginning in late 2023. The system uses 40-foot (12 m) buses on a route featuring many BRT features, but distinctly lacking dedicated lanes.

== History ==
Work on a bus rapid transit in Oklahoma City began in earnest in 2018, with the approval of a $14.3 million BUILD grant for the RAPID NW line. This NW line would travel 9.5 miles northwest of downtown, connecting 91,000 jobs and 40,000 residents.

All stations along the route were planned to include level boarding, ticket machines, benches, bus tracking, new sidewalks and bike racks. In addition, certain locations included transit signals, queue jumps, and combined bus/right-turn lanes. Every intersection was equipped with transit signal priority.

On December 3, 2023, the line opened with fare-free service for the remainder of December. The projected ridership for the line was anticipated to be 1,000 passengers per day. These projects were quickly outdone, with ridership steadily increasing in the years since to 1,400 per day as of 2026.

=== Lines in planning ===
In 2022, Embark proposed a RAPID route connecting downtown Oklahoma City to Tinker Air Force Base and Del City. This route would primarily traverse SE 29th Street. However, planning for this route has not advanced as a result of Midwest City, through which the route would run, withdrawing from the regional transit authority.

Beginning in the summer of 2023, public outreach and planning began in full swing for a northeast route and south route. By summer 2024, this had been refined to one 17-mile route traveling from the Adventure District to SW 89th Street and Portland Avenue. This route would serve 26 stations and connect 50,000 jobs. One year later, the City Council authorized $61 million of MAPS 4 funding for the project, allowing Embark to apply for federal grant funding to reach the $95 million project cost.

== Operations ==
=== Stations ===
The RAPID NW route runs northwest from Downtown Oklahoma City primarily along Classen Boulevard and the Northwest Expressway. The 32 stations include benches, shelters, an arrival sign, bike racks, and a ticket kiosk.

=== Headways ===
Time	5A	6A	7A	8A	9A	10A	11A	12P	1P	2P	3P	4P	5P	6P	7P	8P	9P	10P	11P	12A	1A	2A
Monday-Thursday	20		12												30						No service	
Friday	20		12												30							
Saturday	No service		15												30							
Sunday	No service		15												30				No service			

=== Buses ===
The RAPID system uses 9 New Flyer Xcelsior CNG buses equipped with transit signal priority.
