= Uno Minda Limited =

Indian manufacturer of automotive components

- Type: Public
- Traded as: NSE: UNOMINDA, BSE: 532539
- Industry: Automotive components
- Predecessor: Minda Industries Limited
- Founded: 1992
- Founder: S. L. Minda
- Headquarters: Gurugram, Haryana, India
- Key people: Nirmal K. Minda (Chairman and Managing Director)
- Website: www.unominda.com

Uno Minda Limited (formerly Minda Industries Limited) is an Indian manufacturer of automotive components headquartered in Gurugram, Haryana. The company supplies lighting systems, alloy wheels, switches, seating and acoustic products to domestic and international vehicle manufacturers.

== History ==
Minda Industries Limited was incorporated in 1992.

In March 2016, the company acquired the global automotive lighting business of Spain’s Rinder Group, including entities in Spain, Colombia and India.

In October 2019, it announced the acquisition of German automotive lighting design firm Delvis GmbH; the transaction was completed in December 2019.

In July 2022, the company’s name was changed to Uno Minda Limited.

== Operations ==
The company's international subsidiaries include operations in Spain and Colombia (via Rinder), Germany (Delvis), and manufacturing investments in Mexico, Indonesia and Vietnam.

== Joint ventures and acquisitions ==
In 2011, the company entered into a joint venture with Toyoda Gosei of Japan to manufacture safety systems and sealing parts. In 2013, it acquired Clarton Horn S.A.U., a Spanish automotive horn manufacturer. In 2022, Uno Minda completed the acquisition of a majority stake in Uzzini Automóviles Components.

== Controversies ==
In January 2025, Uno Minda initiated arbitration against its joint venture partner Westport Fuel Systems at the Singapore International Arbitration Centre, alleging breach of an exclusivity agreement. The company sought damages of about ₹250 crore, but maintained that the dispute had not disrupted supplies and was expected to be resolved amicably.

In July 2025, Uno Minda received an order from the Commissioner of Customs, Chennai-II, over alleged misclassification of HSN codes on imported goods. The order included a penalty of ₹42.9 million and a redemption fine of ₹10 million. The company said it would contest the order and stated that the matter would not materially affect its operations.

== See also ==
- Automotive industry in India
