= Campus Area Rapid Transit =

Transit system for the University of Oklahoma

- Headquarters: 510 E. Chesapeake St.
- Locale: Norman, Oklahoma
- Service area: University of Oklahoma
- Service type: bus service
- Alliance: EMBARK
- Routes: 4
- Hubs: Campus Depot
- Website: Campus Area Rapid Transit

Campus Area Rapid Transit (CART) is a transit system serving the University of Oklahoma in Norman, Oklahoma. The system, operated by the university, consists of four routes serving the campus, local apartments, and research facilities. Buses operate Monday through Friday and are free for OU students.

The system previously provided public transit for the city of Norman under the name Cleveland Area Rapid Transit (named for Cleveland County). In 2019, following financial difficulties, non-campus service was transferred to EMBARK, the transit agency of Oklahoma City.

Former logo as Cleveland Area Rapid Transit

== Routes ==
As of 2025, CART operates 4 routes, which operate Monday through Friday. All four routes stop at the Campus Depot bus stop near Gaylord Family Oklahoma Memorial Stadium.

#	Route	Description	Notes
32	Apartment Loop	Campus Depot to Post Oak Apartments	
40	Lloyd Noble Shuttle	Campus Depot to parking at Lloyd Noble Center	Also operates during OU football games
42	Research Route	Campus Depot to National Weather Center and University Research Campus	
52	Campus Loop	Loop around campus	Does not run outside of the fall and spring semesters

== See also ==
- List of bus transit systems in the United States
- Embark Norman
