= New Flyer Xcelsior =

Line of transit buses built by New Flyer

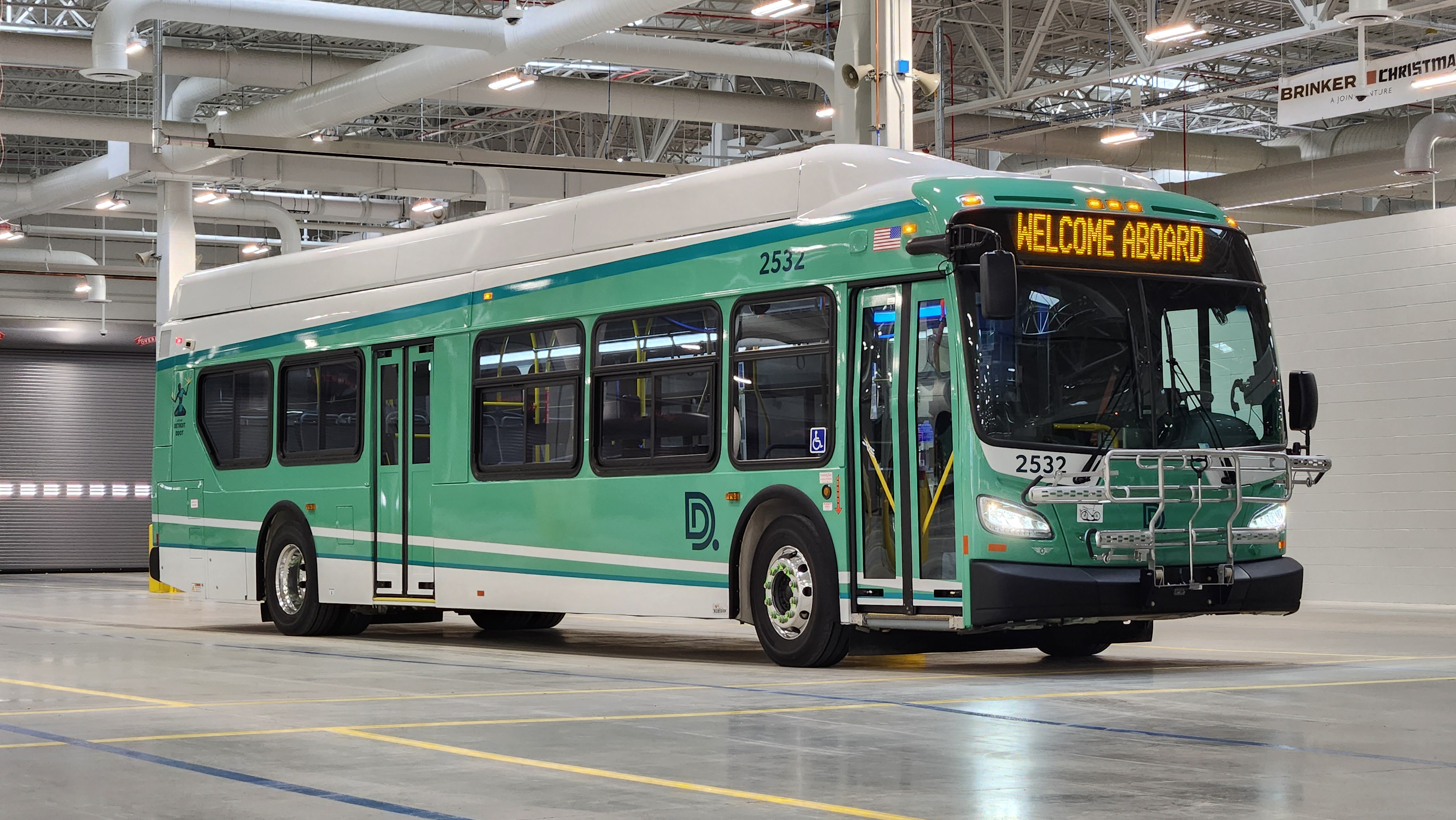
- Typical Xcelsior bus (XDE40), operated by the Detroit Department of Transportation

Overview
- Manufacturer: New Flyer
- Production: 2008–present
- Assembly: Canada: Winnipeg, Manitoba; United States: Anniston, Alabama (2015–present); Crookston, Minnesota; St. Cloud, Minnesota

Body and chassis
- Class: Transit bus
- Body style: Monocoque stressed-skin
- Layout: Rear-engine or rear-motor, rear-wheel-drive; Center- and rear-motors, four-wheel-drive (XE60 and XHE60, optional on XDE60)
- Platform: Xcelsior
- Doors: 2 doors (35-foot); 2 or 3 doors (40-foot); 2, 3 or 5 doors (60-foot)
- Floor type: Low-floor

Powertrain
- Engine: Diesel: Cummins L9; Hybrid: Cummins B6.7 (35- & 40-foot) or L9 (60-foot); CNG: Cummins-Westport L9N
- Electric motor: Battery Electric: Siemens ELFA 3 (plus ZF AVE130 on 60-foot); Hybrid: Allison H 40 (35- & 40-foot), H 50 (60-foot), BAE HDS200 (35- & 40-foot) or HDS300 (60-foot); Hydrogen: Siemens ELFA 2 (plus ZF AVE130 on 60-foot); Trolley: Kiepe Electric
- Transmission: Allison B 400 (35- & 40-foot), B 500 (60-foot), Voith or ZF

Dimensions
- Wheelbase: 226.75 in (5.76 m) (35-foot); 283.75 in (7.21 m) (40-foot); Front: 229 in (5.82 m) / Rear: 293 in (7.44 m) (60-foot)
- Length: over bumpers: 36 ft 3 in (11.0 m) (35-foot); 41 ft (12.5 m) (40-foot); 60 ft 10 in (18.5 m) (60-foot)
- Width: 102 in (2.59 m)
- Height: 10 ft 6 in (3.20 m) (diesel); 11 ft 1 in (3.38 m) (all others)
- Curb weight: 24,500–29,300 lb (11,100–13,300 kg) (35-foot); 26,000–30,500 lb (11,800–13,800 kg) (40-foot); 39,000–45,500 lb (17,700–20,600 kg) (60-foot)

Chronology
- Predecessor: New Flyer Low Floor; New Flyer Invero; NABI LFW; NABI BRT

The New Flyer Xcelsior series is a line of low-floor transit buses manufactured by New Flyer Industries for the North American market since 2008. It is offered in three nominal lengths (35- and 40-foot rigid, and 60-foot articulated), and with a range of different powertrains, including diesel and compressed natural gas engines, hybrid, fuel cell, trolleybus, and battery electric configurations.

== Variants ==
Similar to its predecessor, the New Flyer Low Floor series, the Xcelsior series includes multiple variants, each named according to its length and powertrain, beginning with the prefix "X." For example, an XD40 is a diesel-powered, 40-foot rigid bus; while an XE60 is a battery-electric, 60-foot articulated bus.

Xcelsior model codes
| Model | Power | Nominal length | Generation (Xcelsior CHARGE models) |
|---|---|---|---|
| X | D = conventional diesel DE = diesel-electric hybrid E = battery-electric HE = hydrogen fuel cell N = compressed natural gas T = electric trolleybus | 35 = 35 feet (10.7 m) rigid 40 = 40 feet (12.2 m) rigid 60 = 60 feet (18.3 m) articulated | none = original design NG = Next Generation |

All powertrains listed above are currently available on 40- and 60-foot buses; the 35-foot body has never been produced with hydrogen or trolleybus powertrains. Production on the diesel-electric hybrid 60-foot bus (XDE60) is suspended as of 2026, but is planned to restart in 2030. The 35-foot hybrid model (XDE35) was slated for discontinuation in 2027, but this decision was later reversed.

== History ==
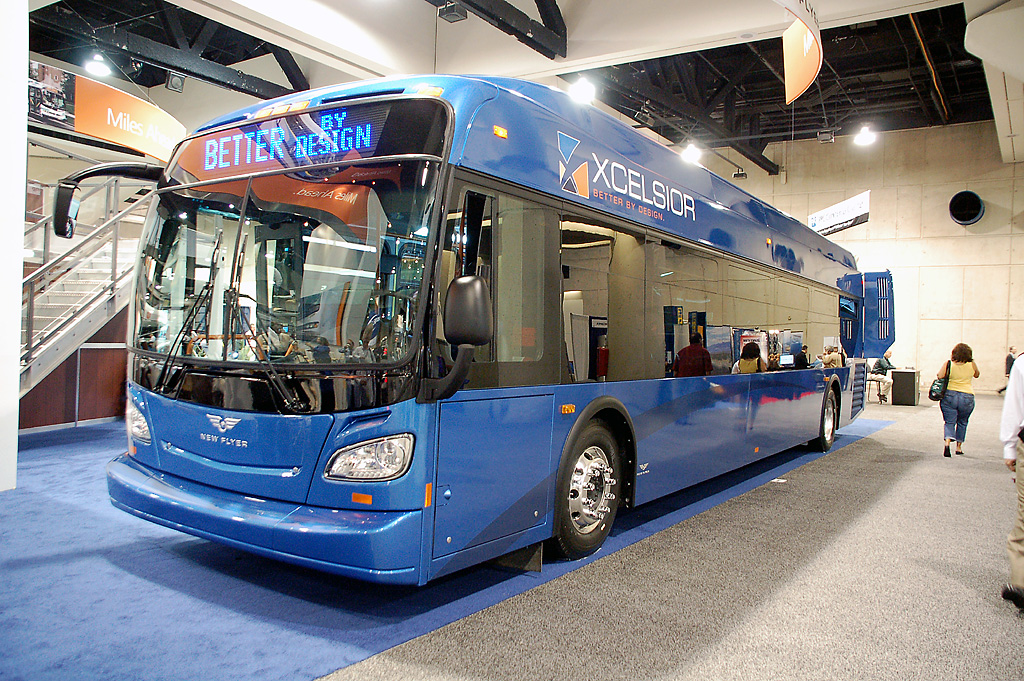
Demonstration unit at the 2008 APTA Expo, where the Xcelsior line was unveiled

Development of the Xcelsior began as a set of improvements to its predecessor, the New Flyer Low Floor, eventually evolving into designing an entirely new bus. The Xcelsior made its public debut in October 2008 at the triennial APTA Expo. Brampton Transit, in the Greater Toronto Area, was the launch customer for the Xcelsior, receiving the first order in 2011.

The Xcelsior is 10% lighter than the Low Floor, boosting fuel economy by about 7%. Its redesigned front fascia, bumpers, and roof shrouds led to better aerodynamics and driver visibility. The bus was also designed to allow a much larger cooling system and the addition of a SCR system, both required to meet new U.S. EPA emissions regulations instituted in 2010. The air conditioning system was moved from the rear of the bus to the roof, a change that New Flyer credited with reducing weight and enabling quieter operation.

The interior of the Xcelsior also differs significantly from the Low Floor series. By moving the fuel tank and modifying the rear suspension, seating capacity on the 40-foot model was increased from 39 to 42, with more forward-facing seats. To improve accessibility, the floor height was lowered to 14 inches (360 mm) with the ability to kneel down to 10 inches (250 mm), and the front entry door was widened, accommodating a wider wheelchair ramp. To improve interior aesthetics, visible fasteners were eliminated and molded plastic surfaces were introduced. The utilitarian instrument panel was replaced with an automotive-style electronic dashboard.

In November 2018, New Flyer delivered the 10,000th Xcelsior produced, an XDE60 for King County Metro.

At launch, the Xcelsior was only available in a 40-foot (12 m) length with power from the Cummins ISL 280 and a Allison B400 conventional transmission or the Allison EP-40 hybrid drive.

=== Electric variants ===
Development of a battery-electric variant of the Xcelsior line was announced in 2011, and a prototype was shown in 2012. Regular production began in 2014, with the first units produced for Winnipeg Transit and the Chicago Transit Authority. The first-generation electric Xcelsior was offered only as a 40-foot model (XE40), and used a permanent magnet traction motor built by Siemens. In October 2017, the second-generation battery-electric Xcelsior, the Xcelsior CHARGE, was introduced, adding the 35-foot XE35 and articulated XE60 models.

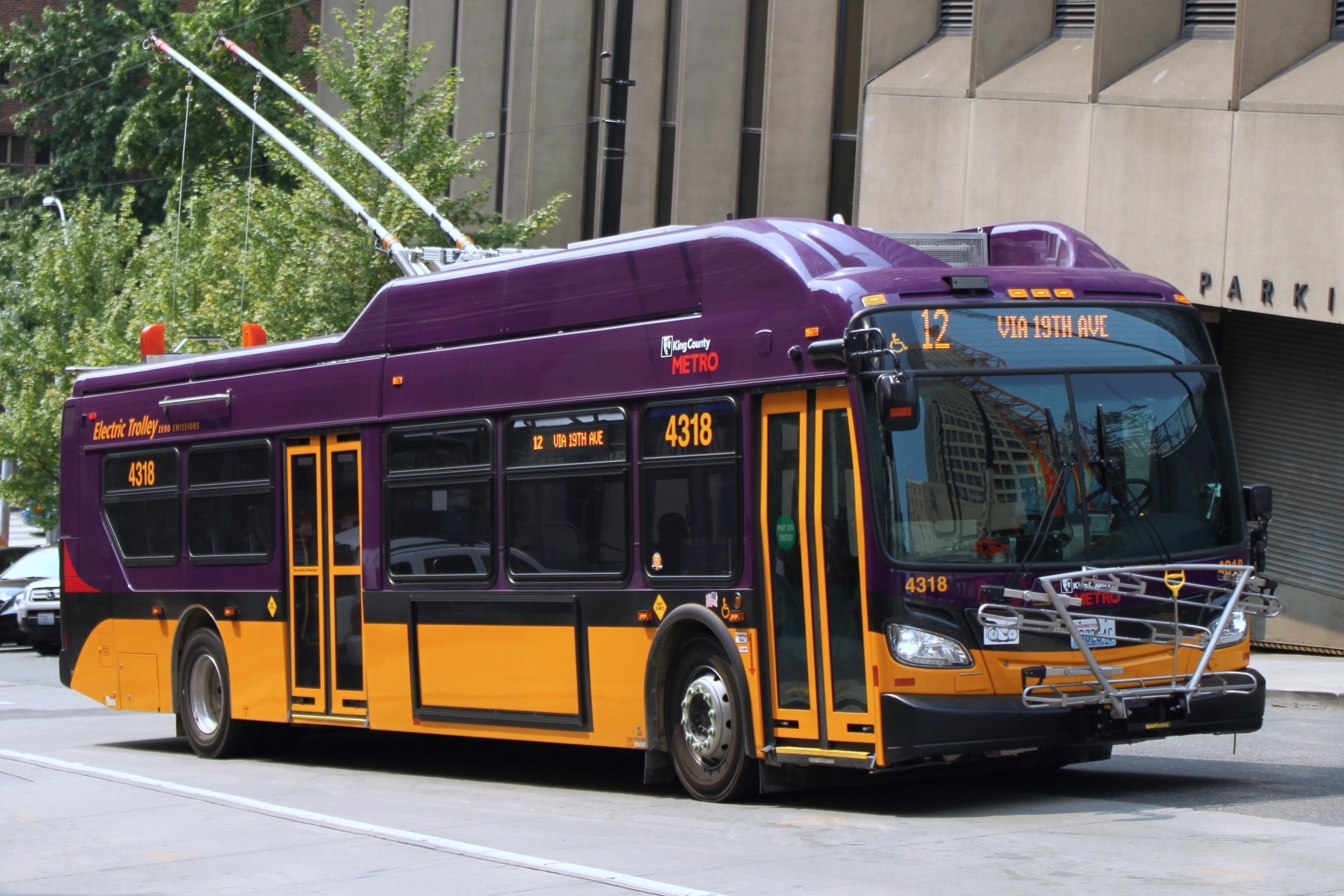
XT40 trolleybus on the Seattle trolleybus system

A trolleybus version of the Xcelsior debuted in 2015 on the Seattle trolleybus system. King County Metro ordered both the rigid XT40 and articulated XT60 in 2013, and received the first deliveries in 2014. The San Francisco Municipal Transportation Agency later purchased both for the San Francisco trolleybus system, where they debuted in 2018. As of 2025, no other systems operate the trolleybus variant.

=== Autonomous variant ===
New Flyer and Maryland-based Robotic Research announced a partnership in May 2019 to develop autonomous buses. The project was funded by a US$2 million grant from the Federal Transit Administration's Integrated Mobility Innovation Program.

The prototype Xcelsior AV was unveiled in January 2021. New Flyer described the Xcelsior AV as the "first heavy-duty autonomous transit bus" in North America, and claimed that the prototype met the SAE J3016 Level 4 of autonomy. The Xcelsior AV is battery-electric, based on the XE40 chassis, and uses Robotic Research's AutoDrive suite of sensors and AutoDrive ByWire mechanical actuators.

The first three Xcelsior AV buses were scheduled to be tested in 2021 on the CTfastrak bus rapid transit line in Connecticut, in partnership with the Connecticut Department of Transportation. The deployment on a BRT line, with a dedicated right-of-way, was intended to test the vehicles' ability to perform precision docking at station platforms and platooning multiple vehicles.

=== Variant discontinuations ===
In August 2024, New Flyer announced the discontinuation of the XDE60 variant in model year 2026, and the XDE35 and XN35 models in model year 2027, citing reduced demand and the unavailability of powertrains for those models which would meet tightening U.S. EPA standards. New Flyer rescinded the announced discontinuation of the XN35 in May 2025.

== Specifications ==
=== Xcelsior CHARGE ===
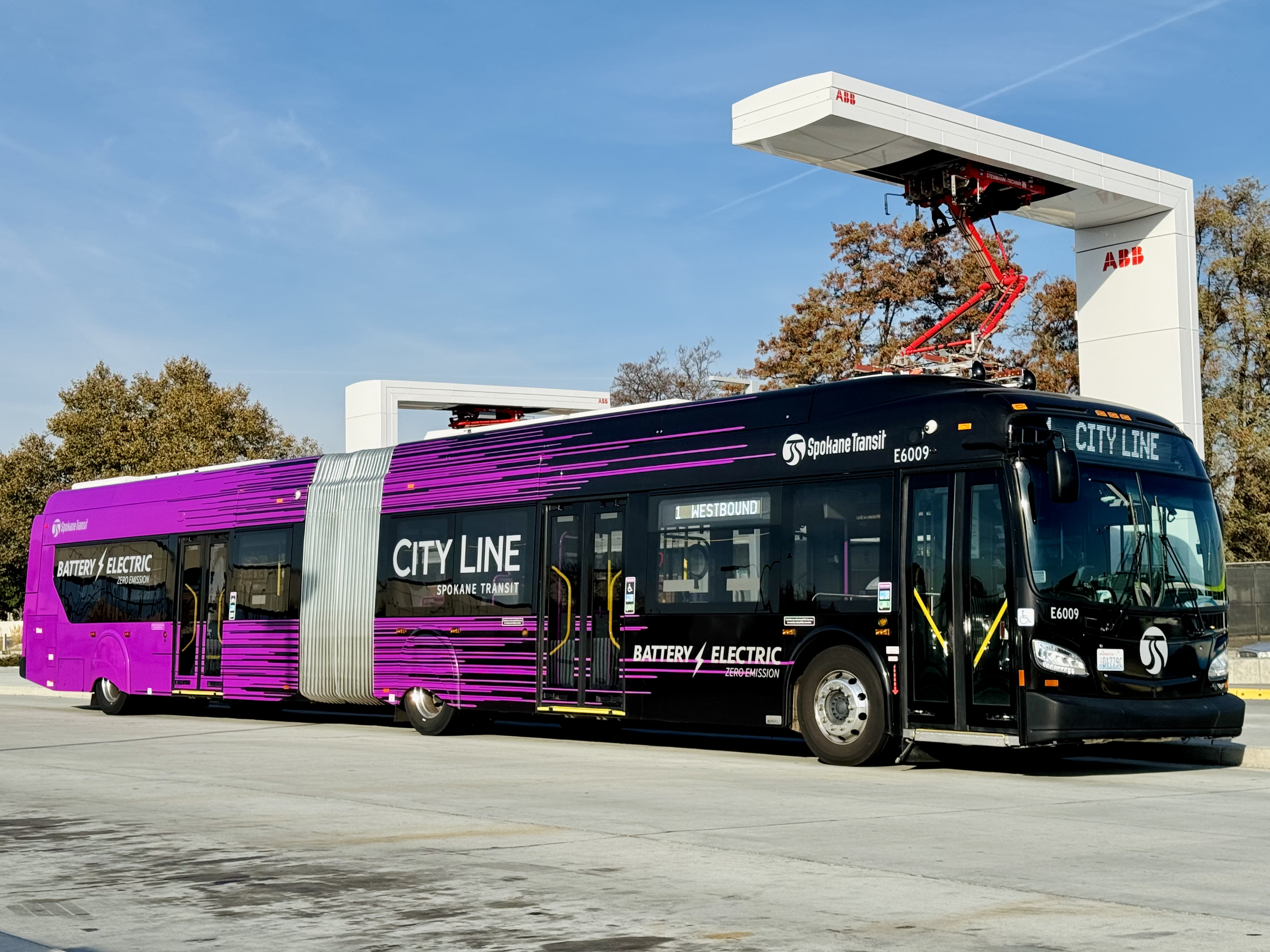
An XE60 battery electric bus operated by Spokane Transit charging via SAE J3105 overhead charging station.

The Xcelsior CHARGE variant (XE) uses the Siemens ELFA2 electric drive system with different options for battery capacity, depending on the charging speed and range required. The traction motor used has an output of either 210 or 280 hp (213 or 284 PS; 157 or 209 kW) and 1,033 or 1,475 lb⋅ft (1,401 or 2,000 N⋅m; 143 or 204 kg⋅m). Batteries are supplied by XALT Energy or A123 Systems (XE60 long-range models and XHEnn fuel cell models). On-route rapid charging is provided through an overhead pantograph designed to be interoperable with the SAE J3105 standard supplying 300–450 kW. Shop or depot charging may be performed using SAE J3068 and J1772 connectors supplying up to 150 kW.

At Altoona, the as-tested empty weight of an XE40 was measured at 32,770 lb (14,860 kg) with a capacity of 76 (38 seated passengers + 37 standing passengers + 1 driver) for a total GVW of 43,550 lb (19,750 kg). It was equipped with 4 XALT Xsyst 7 (7 kWh) batteries and a SPHEROS fuel-fired heater. When accelerating from a constant speed, the bus emitted an average maximum noise level of 66.1 dB(A), considerably lower than the average maximum noise level of 70.4 dB(A) measured from a conventionally-powered XD40.

==== XE60 ====
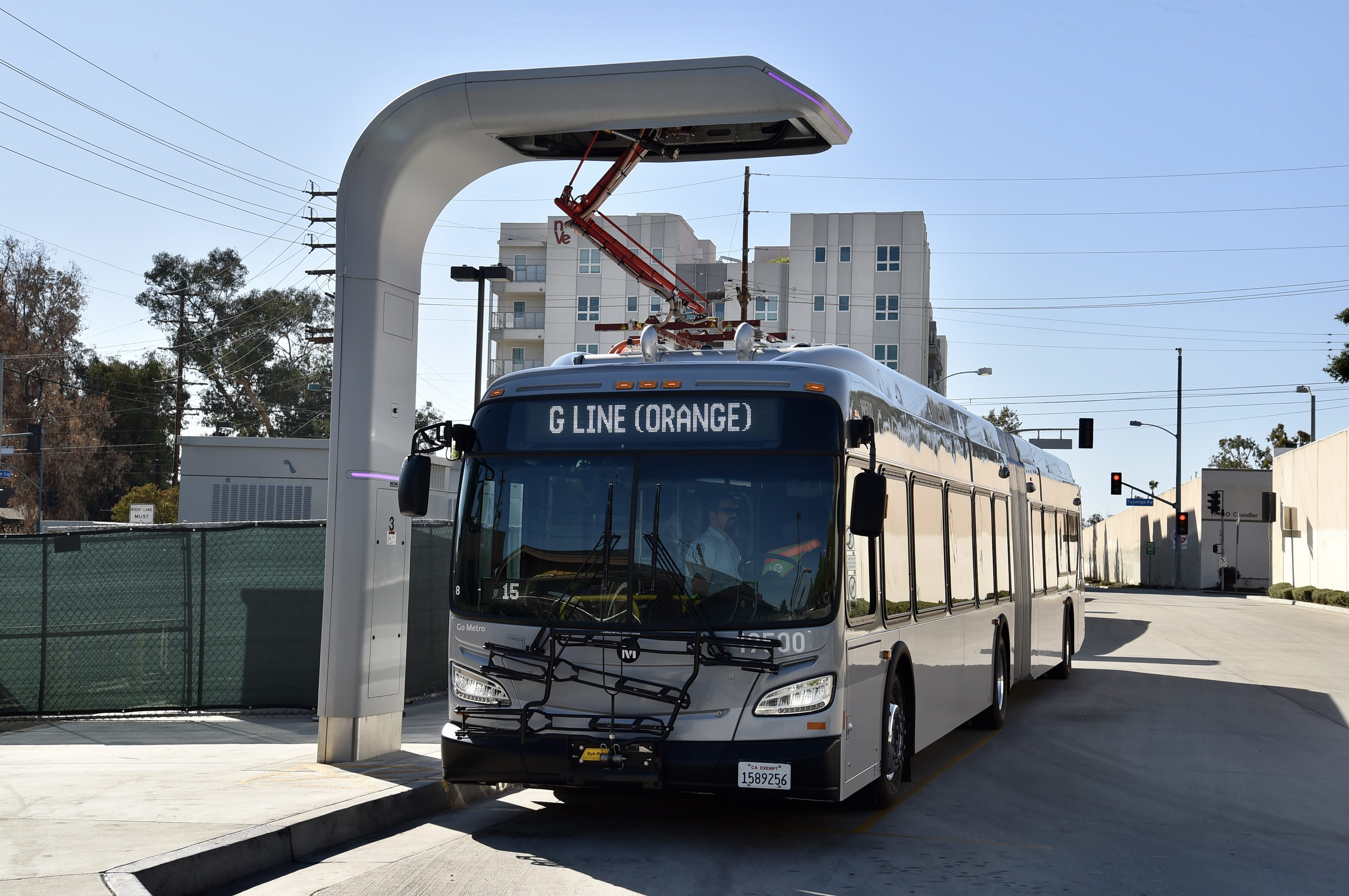
Los Angeles County Metropolitan Transportation Authority XE60 bus using on-route charger at North Hollywood station

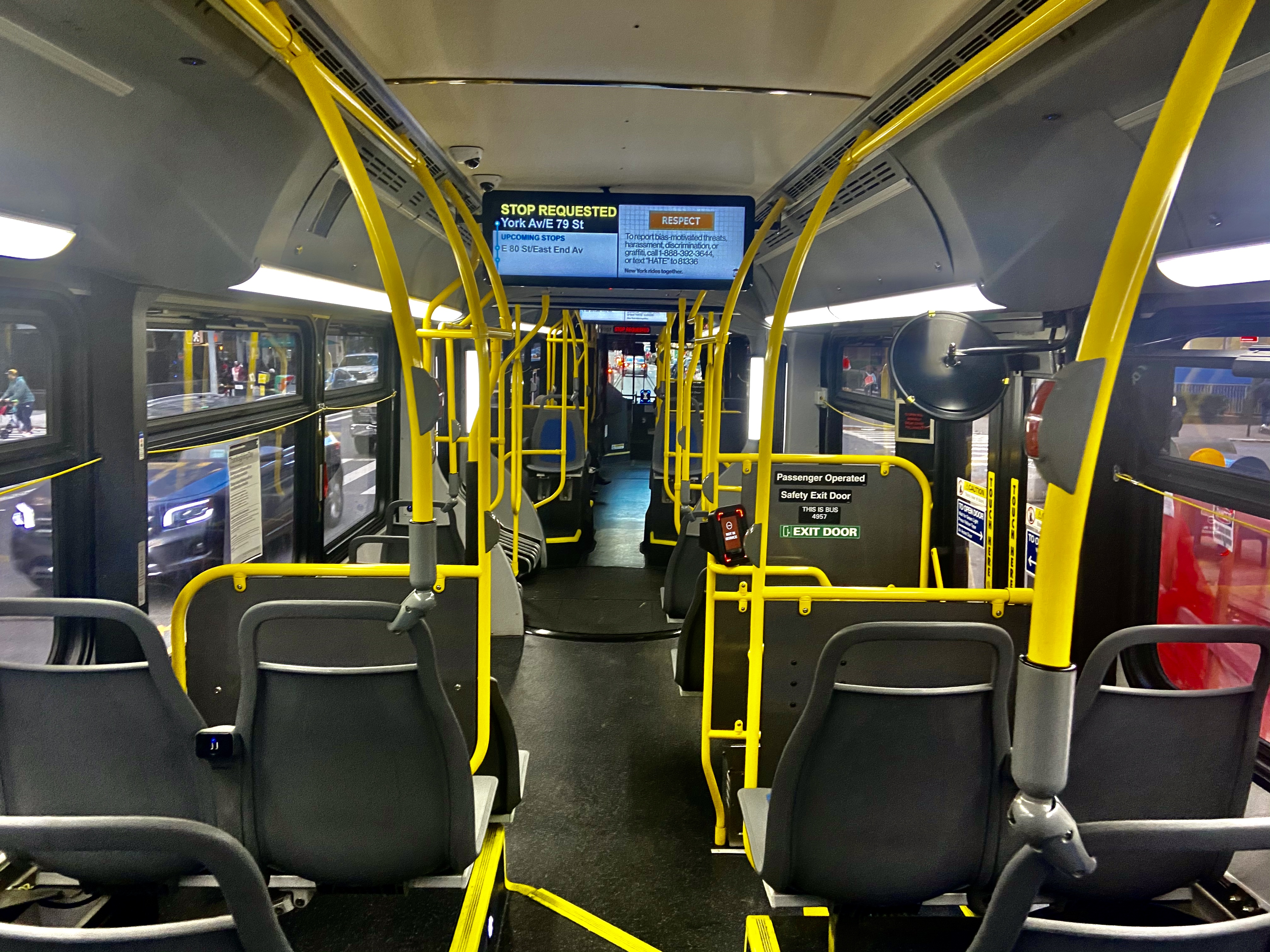
The interior of an XE60 owned by the New York City Transit Authority. Specifications may be different for other transit agencies.

The articulated XE60 adds a second driven axle, using the ZF AxTrax AVE uses two electric motors (one per wheel), each with a maximum continuous/peak output of 160 / 340 hp (162 / 345 PS; 119 / 254 kW) and maximum continuous/peak torque of 6,000 / 16,200 lb⋅ft (8,135 / 21,964 N⋅m; 830 / 2,240 kg⋅m). Each motor is an asynchronous three-phase AC motor operating on 650 VDC with an input current of 250 (continuous) to 340 (peak) amps, using a single-speed reduction gear ratio of 22.66:1. The complete axle assembly weighs 2,760 lb (1,250 kg)

The as-tested empty weight of an XE60 was 52,070 lb (23,620 kg) with a capacity of 120 (50 seated passengers + 69 standing passengers + 1 driver) for a total GVW of 70,170 lb (31,830 kg). Compared to the diesel-powered equivalent XD60, the XE60 is heavier (XD60 GVW is 58,600 lb (26,600 kg)) and holds slightly fewer people (XD60 capacity is 123 people: 49 seated, 73 standing, 1 driver). Depending on the driving route/style, the XE60 tested at Altoona had a predicted range of 145 to 246 miles (233 to 396 km).

==== Xcelsior CHARGE NG ====
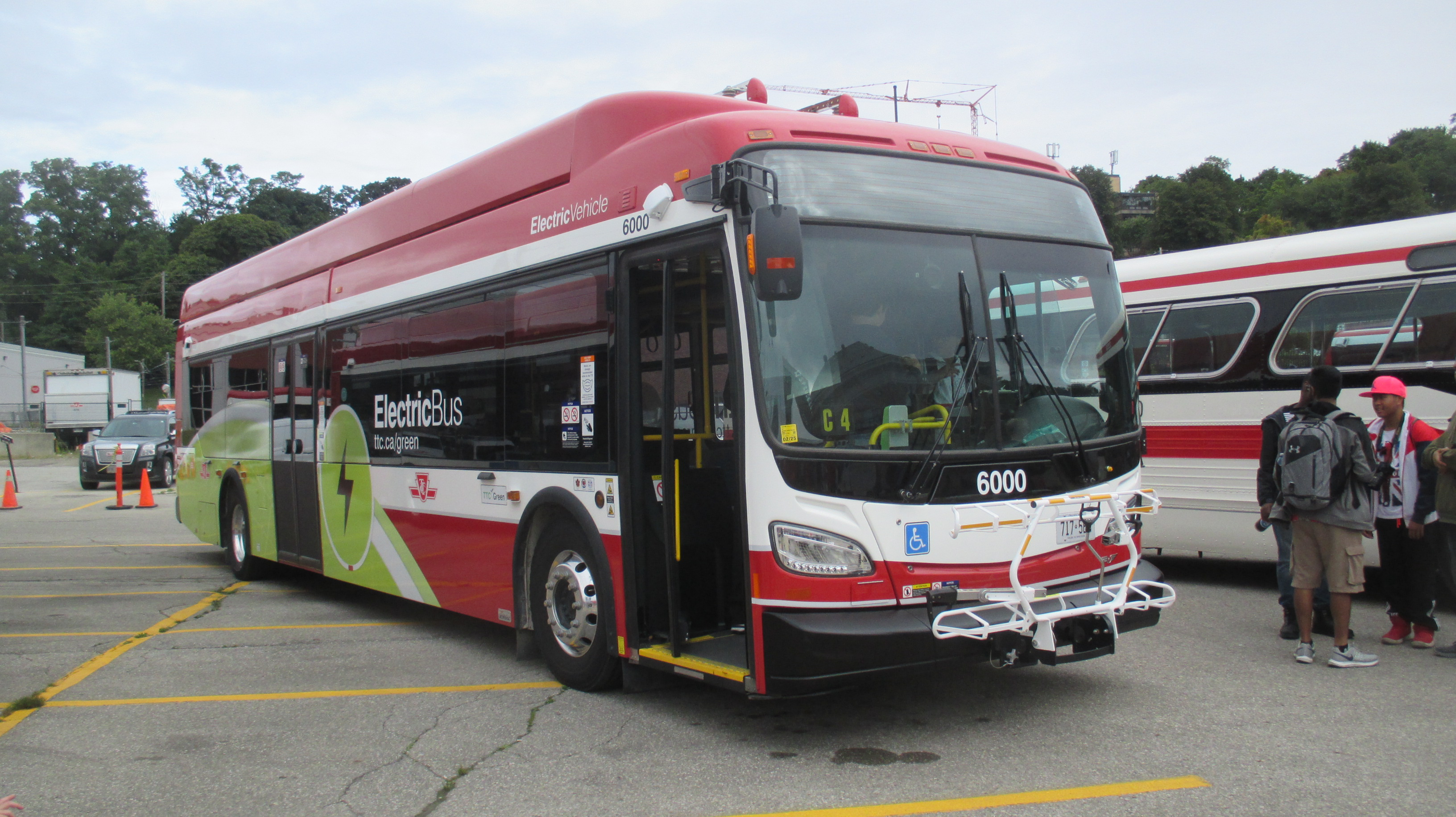
An XE40 NG bus owned by the Toronto Transit Commission.

Xcelsior CHARGE NG is New Flyer's next generation battery electric, zero-emission bus. It is lighter, simpler and has longer range with better energy recovery. It has a capacity of 32-61 passengers with 2 wheelchair locations. It is available in 35-, 40-, and 60-foot configurations. It has a Siemens ELFA3 traction motor, Lithium Manganese Cobalt (NMC) batteries, and electric roof-mounted HVAC(s).

==== Xcelsior CHARGE H2 ====
The CHARGE model can be equipped with a hydrogen fuel cell (model code XHE), which acts as an on-board charger to extend range. Earlier New Flyer fuel cell buses were based on the preceding Low Floor chassis, designated H40LFR, and integrated by an outside vendor. In 2016, New Flyer received an order for 25 XHE40 buses under the California Air Resources Board Air Quality Improvement Program (AQIP). The XHE40 uses a MAN SE model 1350 rear axle with a traction motor from Siemens; like the XE60, the XHE60 also uses a MAN 1350 rear axle as a pusher, but adds a ZF AxTrax AVE middle axle as a puller for traction-challenged conditions.

An XHE60 tested at Altoona weighed 49,890 lb (22,630 kg) empty; with a total capacity of 132 (1 driver, 50 seated, 81 standing), the estimated GVW was 69,750 lb (31,640 kg). The fuel cell was a Ballard HD85 with an 85 kW output.

Development of the electric fuel cell buses is centered in California, with AC Transit serving as the lead agency for one XHE60, and SunLine Transit Agency, AC Transit, and Orange County Transportation Authority testing several variants of XHE40.

== See also ==
Competing models:

- BYD K9
- ENC Axess
- Gillig Low Floor
- NABI BRT
- NABI LFW
- Nova Bus LFS
- Orion VII
- Proterra ZX5
