= Gillig Low Floor =

American transit bus type

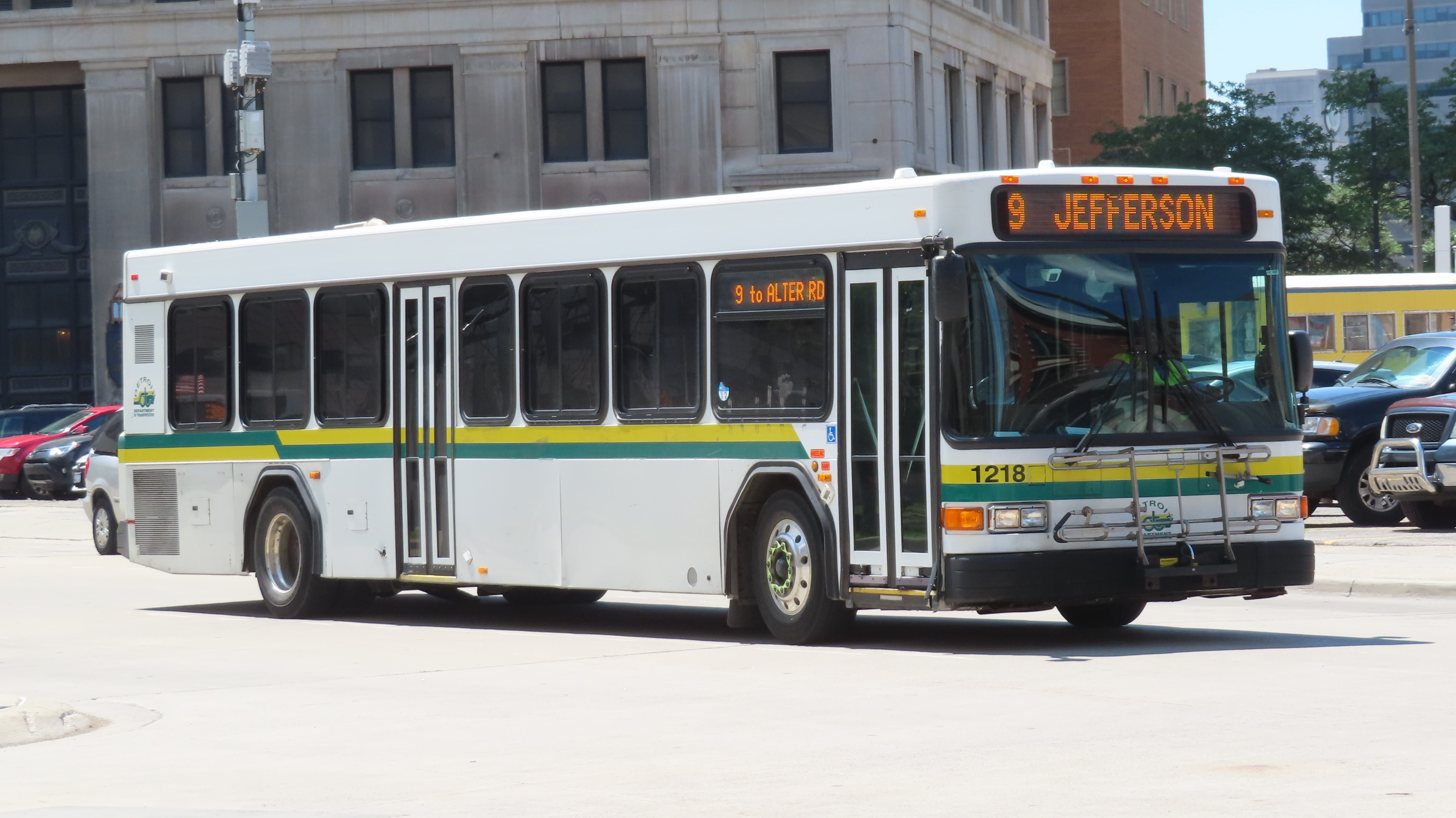
- Typical Gillig Low Floor bus, operated by the Detroit Department of Transportation

Overview
- Manufacturer: Gillig
- Also called: Gillig H2000LF; Gillig Advantage
- Production: 1996–present
- Assembly: United States: Hayward, California (Hayward Plant) (1996–2017); Livermore, California (2017–present)

Body and chassis
- Class: Transit bus
- Body style: Single-decker bus
- Doors: 2 doors; 1 door (suburban configuration); Mid-entry (1 door, airport shuttle)
- Floor type: Low entry
- Chassis: Integral

Powertrain
- Engine: Caterpillar: Caterpillar C9; Cummins: Cummins C8.3; Cummins ISC; Cummins ISL; Cummins M11; Cummins ISM; Cummins ISB (Hybrid); Cummins Westport ISL G (CNG); Detroit Diesel: Detroit Diesel Series 40; Detroit Diesel Series 50
- Capacity: 29-foot: 28; 35-foot: 32; 40-foot: 40
- Transmission: Allison Transmission: Allison B300R; Allison B400R; Allison H 40 EP (Hybrid); Voith: Voith D863.3E; Voith D864.3E; Voith D864.5; ZF: ZF HP592C; ZF HP594C

Dimensions
- Wheelbase: 29-foot: 163 in (4,140.2 mm); 35-foot: 235 in (5,969.0 mm); 40-foot: 284 in (7,213.6 mm)
- Length: 29–40 ft (8.8–12.2 m)
- Width: 102 in (2,590.8 mm)
- Height: 29-foot: 115 in (2,921.0 mm); 35-, 40-foot:116 in (2,946.4 mm)
- Curb weight: Curb Weight: 29960 lbs., GVWR: 39600 lbs

Chronology
- Predecessor: Gillig Phantom

The Gillig Low Floor (alternatively known as the Gillig Advantage) is a low-floor transit bus manufactured by Gillig for the U.S. market since 1997. It is produced in three nominal lengths (29, 35, and 40 foot) with several different powertrain options, including diesel, compressed natural gas engines, diesel-electric hybrid, battery-electric, and hydrogen fuel cell powertrains.

The Gillig Low Floor was the second low-floor bus sold in the United States, following the New Flyer Low Floor. Introduced alongside the high-floor Gillig Phantom, it replaced the Phantom by 2008 and has since been Gillig's sole product.

== Variants ==
The Low Floor line is produced in five distinct body styles, which all share the same basic structure and chassis:

- The original, standard Gillig Low Floor has a traditional rectangular body and rectangular sealed-beam headlamps.
- The modified Gillig BRT variant (produced since 2005) incorporates a curved front fascia, round projector headlamps, and a modified rear design. It is roughly one foot longer than a standard Low Floor.
- The BRT Plus variant (introduced in 2011) incorporates the BRT variant's styling with a higher roofline.
- The Low Floor Plus variant (introduced in 2017) has a flatter modified front fascia with round projector headlamps, and a raised roof similar to the BRT Plus.
- The Gillig Trolley Replica variant is a trolley-replica bus based on the standard Low Floor body, produced in collaboration with Cable Car Classics of Healdsburg, California. Its exterior styling resembles a historic streetcar, and includes faux wood trim, stylized lettering and paint accents, and an artificially raised roof. It has a modified interior with wooden seats, and brass and leather accents.

All five body styles are available in 29-foot, 35-foot, and 40-foot nominal lengths, and with conventional diesel, diesel-electric hybrid, and CNG powertrains. The battery-electric powertrain is only offered with the Low Floor Plus body.

Gillig Low Floor variants

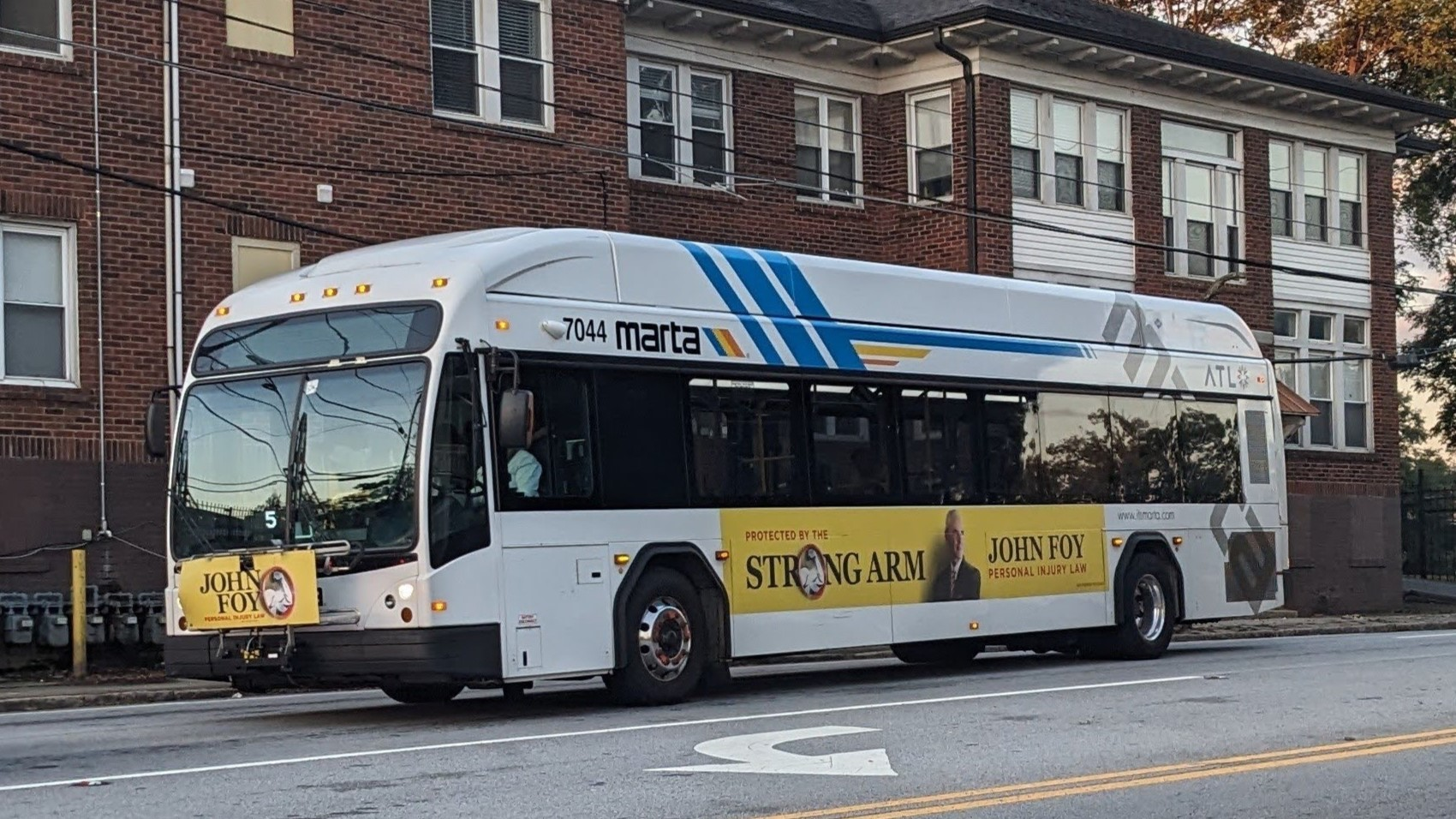
BRT Plus, with curved front fascia and raised roof, operated by MARTA

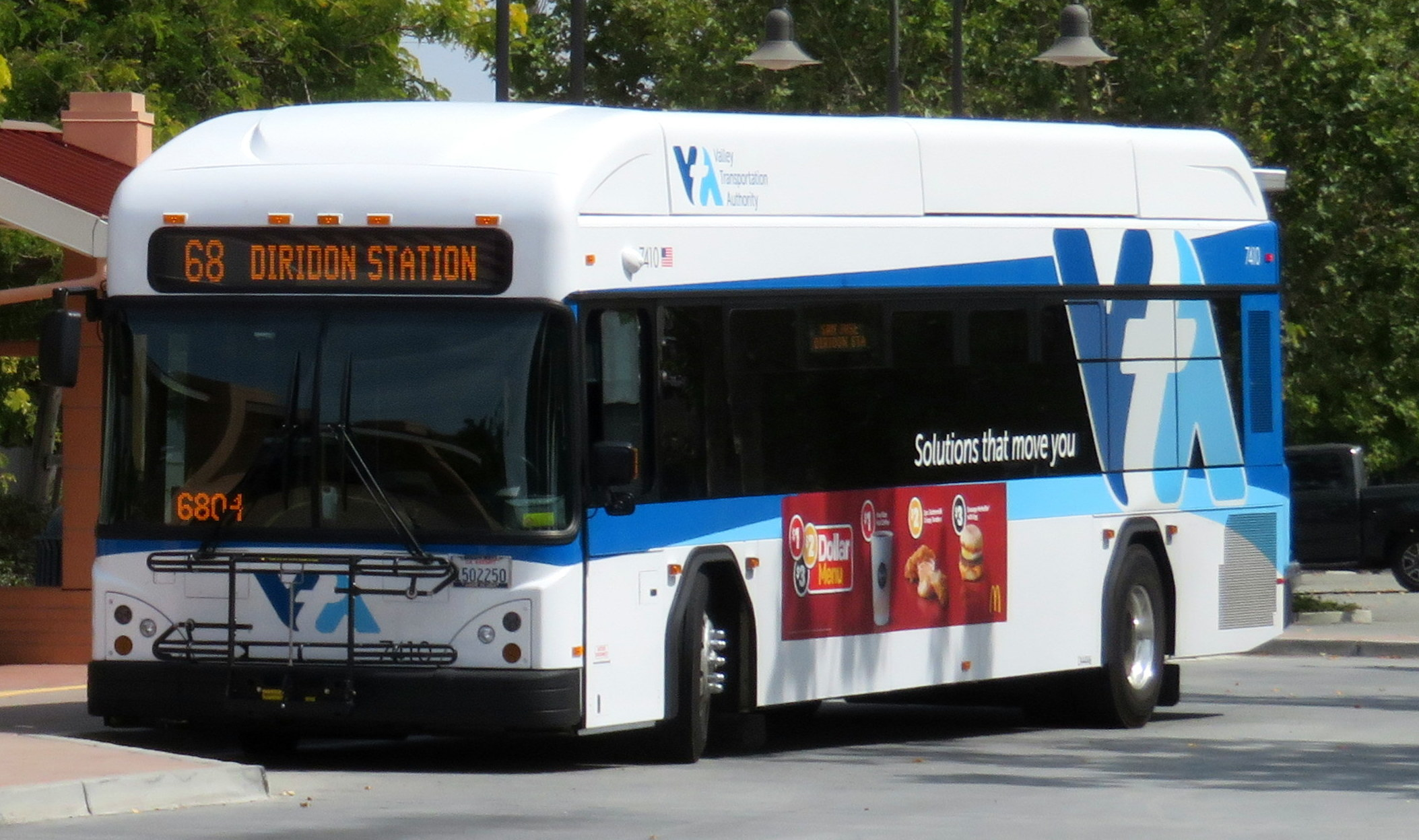
Low Floor Plus, with modified front fascia and raised roof, operated by VTA

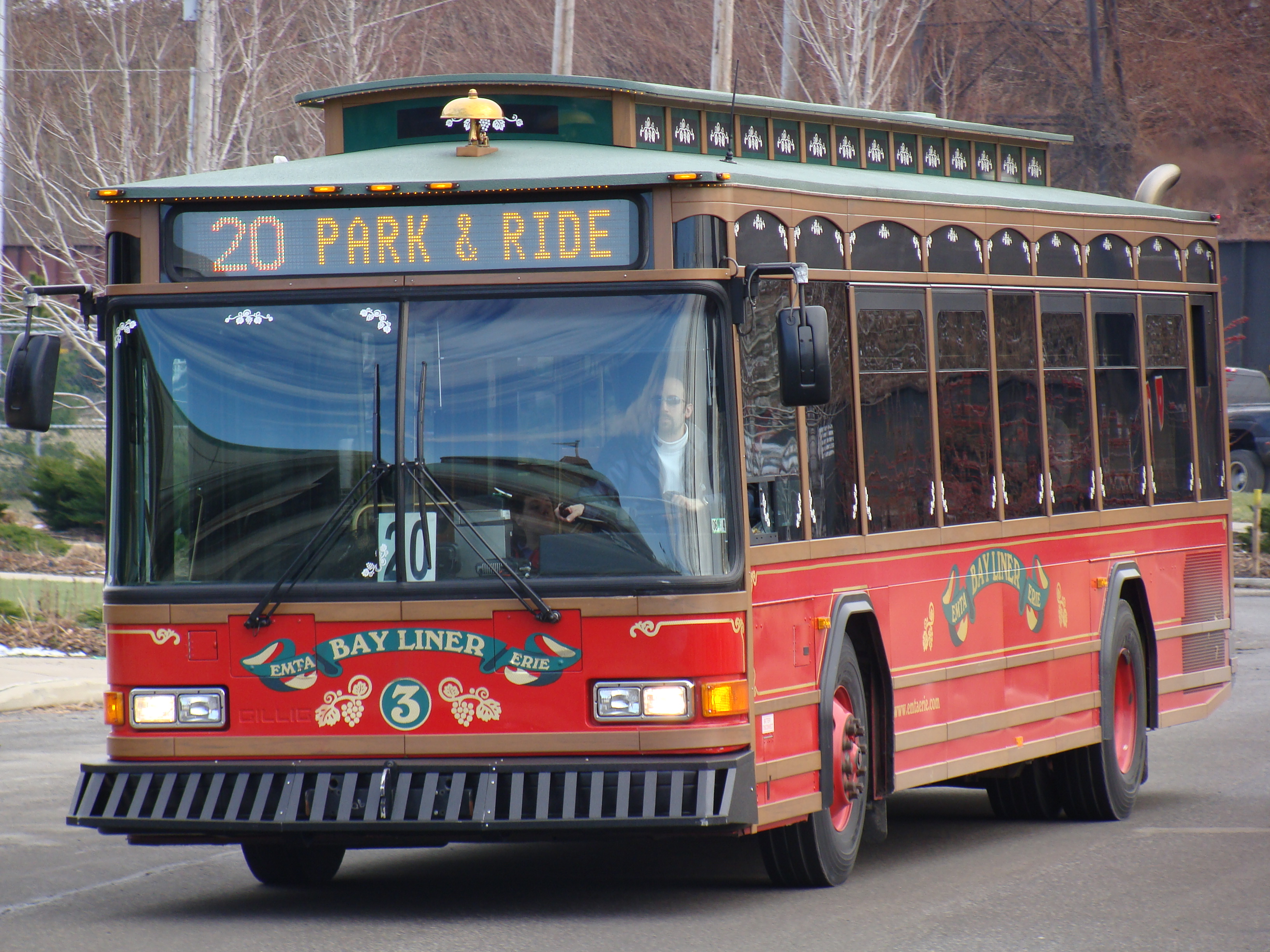
Trolley Replica, operated by EMTA

== Design history ==
The Gillig Low Floor began life in the mid-1990s when Gillig was approached by Hertz Corporation, who sought a shuttle bus for its airport locations (to replace its fleet of GMC RTS buses). Featuring a carpeted interior, luggage racks, and a central entry door, the primary design requirement of Hertz was a low-floor entry for those carrying luggage or with limited mobility. In 1996, the first buses for Hertz (named the Gillig H2000LF) entered production, with Hertz placing the H2000LF in service at Logan International Airport in Boston (expanding to other airports in the United States). Gillig would produce the H2000LF for Hertz through 2005, when the design was replaced by standard Gillig Low Floor buses.

In 1997, Gillig developed the H2000LF shuttle bus into the Low Floor transit bus. Several changes were made to the design, distinguished primarily by the reconfiguration of the entry doors (replacing the central entry with dual-entry doors).

Following the renaming of the model line, Gillig introduced the Low Floor as an expansion of its product range, marketed alongside the step-entrance Phantom.

Selected updates and variations

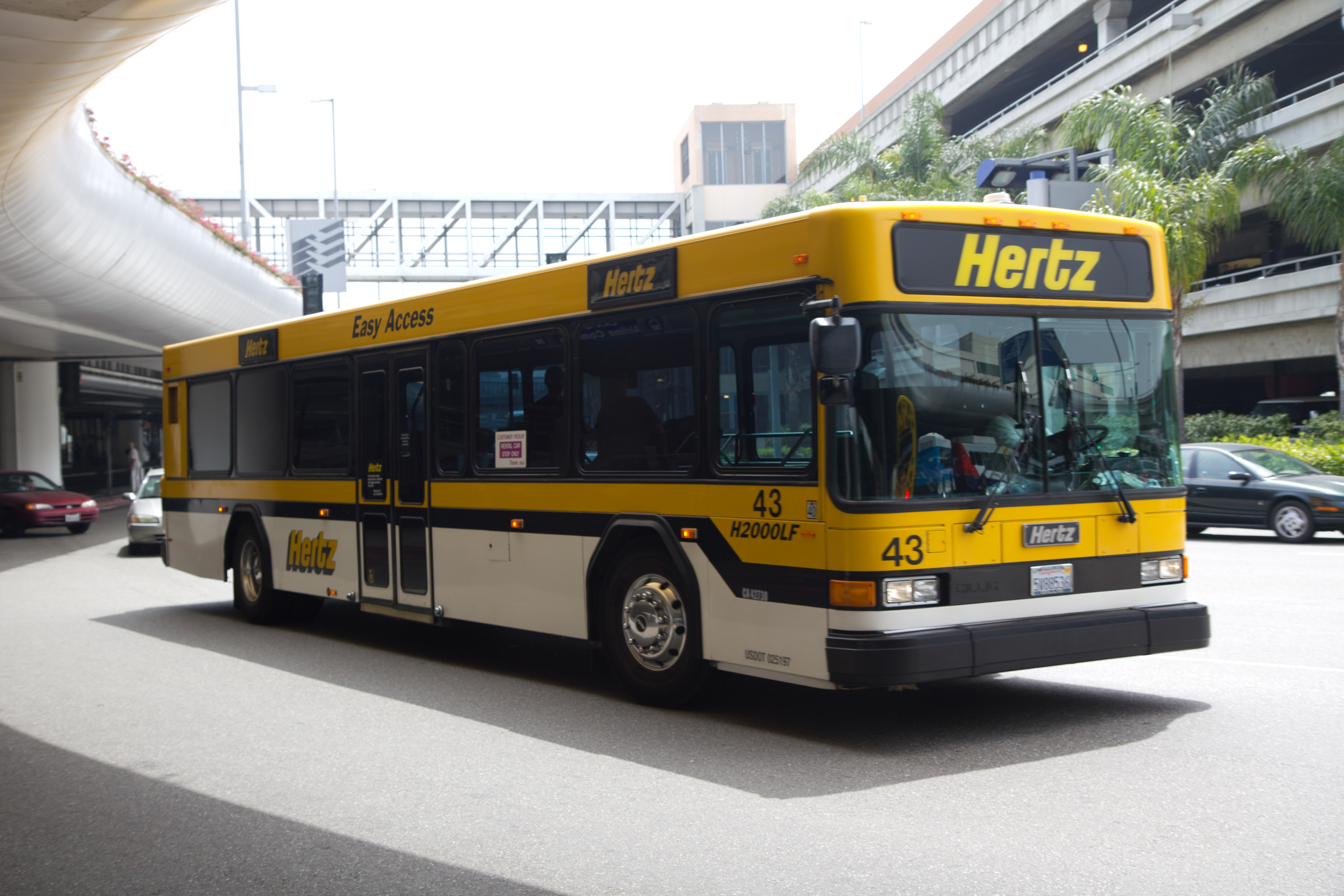
H2000LF (1998) for Hertz; note large, printed destination/headsign and center door

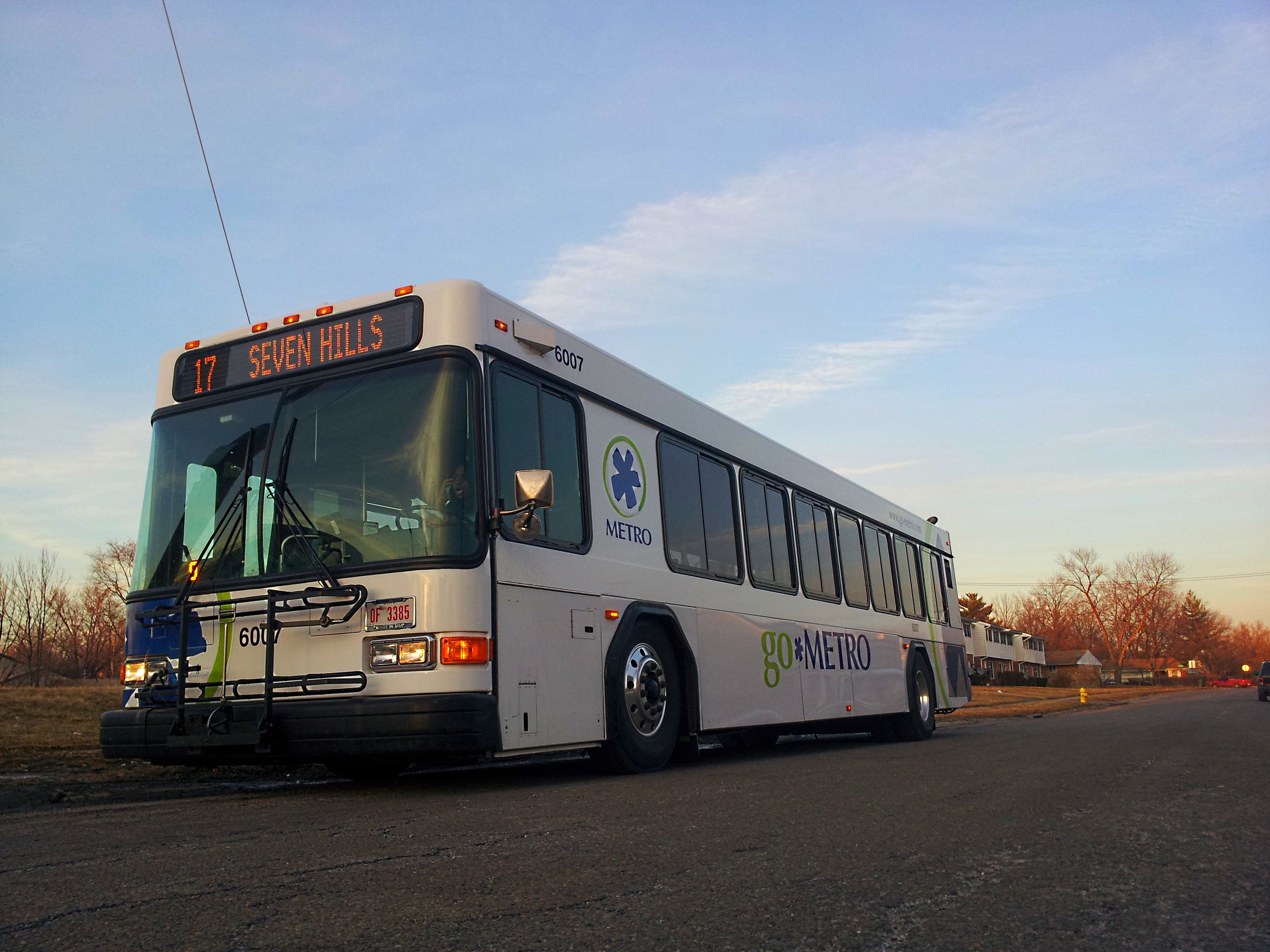
Low Floor (2006) for SORTA; note smaller headsign; top of windshield now aligned with top of sliding side windows

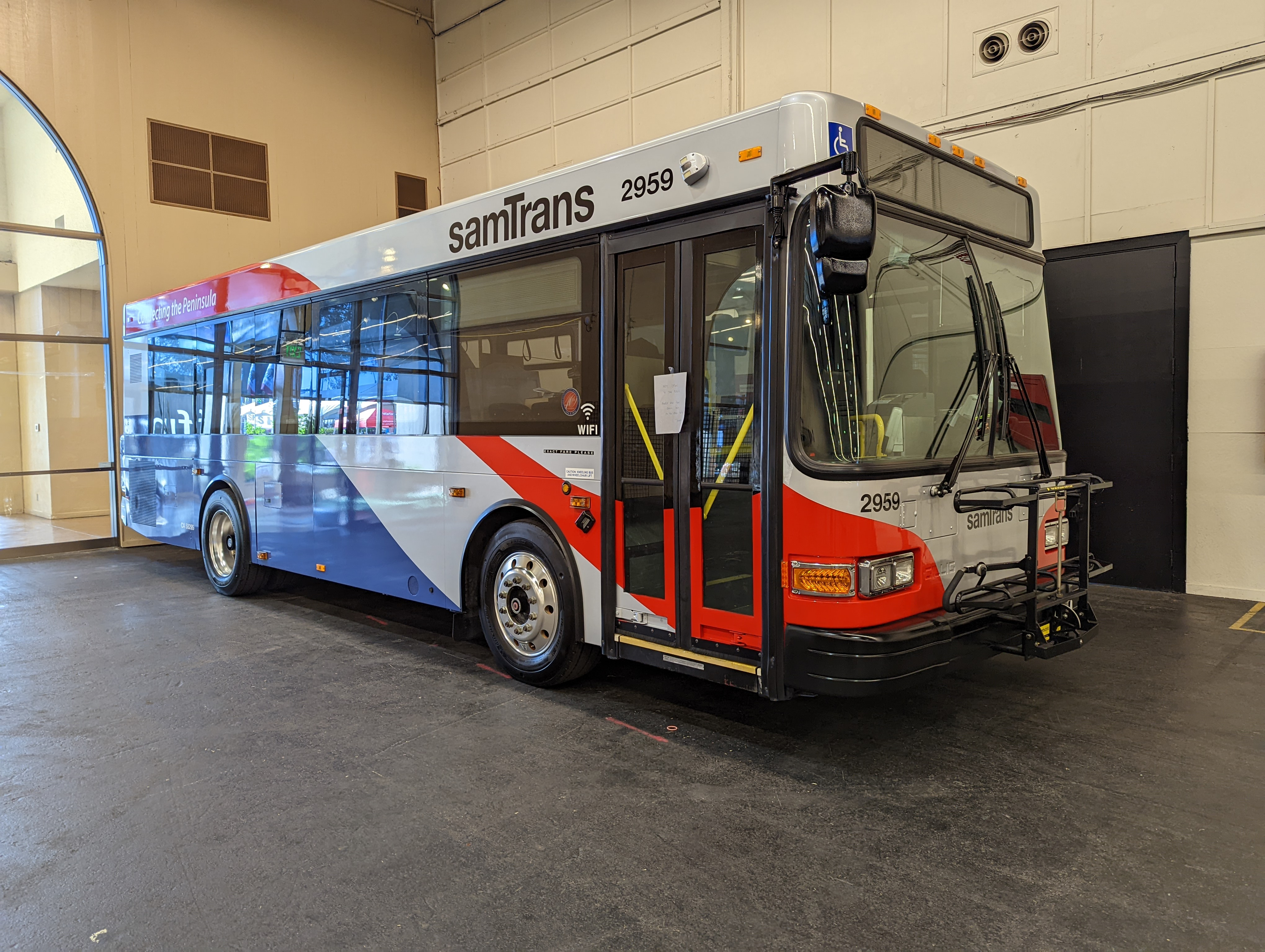
Low Floor (2014) for SamTrans; note larger door glass (square corners) and frameless side windows

During its production, the Low Floor has undergone several revisions to its body design. In 2002, the windshield was enlarged (with the use of a smaller destination sign) and the side windows were reduced in width. After 2003, the rear side split windows that were configured upside down were reconfigured to match the rest of the side windows; frameless windows later became an option (with or without split openings).

In 2005, the Low Floor model line was expanded with the addition of the Low Floor BRT, adding restyled front and rear bodywork and a front roof fairing; the Trolley Replica (not a trolleybus) restyled the standard Low Floor body as a vintage trolley.

In 2008, the entry doors were revised, adopting larger glass panels (distinguished by squared-off corners). A suburban configuration was introduced alongside the standard transit Low Floor (replacing the version previously offered on the Gillig Phantom). Distinguished by its lack of a rear-entry door, the suburban Low Floor was configured with forward-facing seating, internal luggage racks, onboard Wi-Fi, and other passenger-related options.

For 2011, the Low Floor BRT Plus was introduced. Coinciding with the introduction of CNG and diesel-electric hybrid powertrains, the Plus adopted a full-length body fairing to accommodate CNG tanks and hybrid equipment on the roof. In 2017, a Low Floor Plus was introduced, combining the roof fairing of the BRT Plus with the body of the standard Low Floor.

A battery-electric powertrain developed by Cummins was made available for the Low Floor Plus variant starting in 2019. The launch client for the Gillig/Cummins battery-electric bus was Big Blue Bus, serving Santa Monica, California. A battery-electric Low Floor (29-foot) was tested at Altoona in 2018, using a drivetrain adapted from the BAE HybriDrive powertrain.

In April 2024, Gillig announced a hydrogen fuel cell variant of the bus, beginning production in 2026.

== Overview ==
Of the two body configurations for low-floor buses, the Gillig Low Floor is a low-entry bus (the front two-thirds to three-fourths of the interior is low-floor) with a low-step entry (nearly curb height) and integrated manual wheelchair ramp while the rear part of the interior (behind the rear axle) is raised to provide sufficient space for the powertrain.

The Gillig Low Floor is produced in three nominal body lengths in its standard transit bus configuration: 40 ft (12.2 m). Maximum seating capacity is 40 passengers for the 40-foot length. The turning radius of the Gillig Low Floor is 43 ft (13.1 m) (40 foot body).

=== Powertrain ===
==== Conventional (internal combustion) ====
Currently (as of 2019 production), the Gillig Low Floor range is equipped with three engines: the Cummins B6.7 diesel, Cummins L9 diesel, and Cummins L9N compressed natural gas inline-six engines. Throughout its production, the Gillig Low Floor has featured a range of Cummins engines along with Caterpillar and Detroit Diesel engines. Allison, Voith, and ZF automatic transmissions are available.

==== Diesel-electric hybrid ====
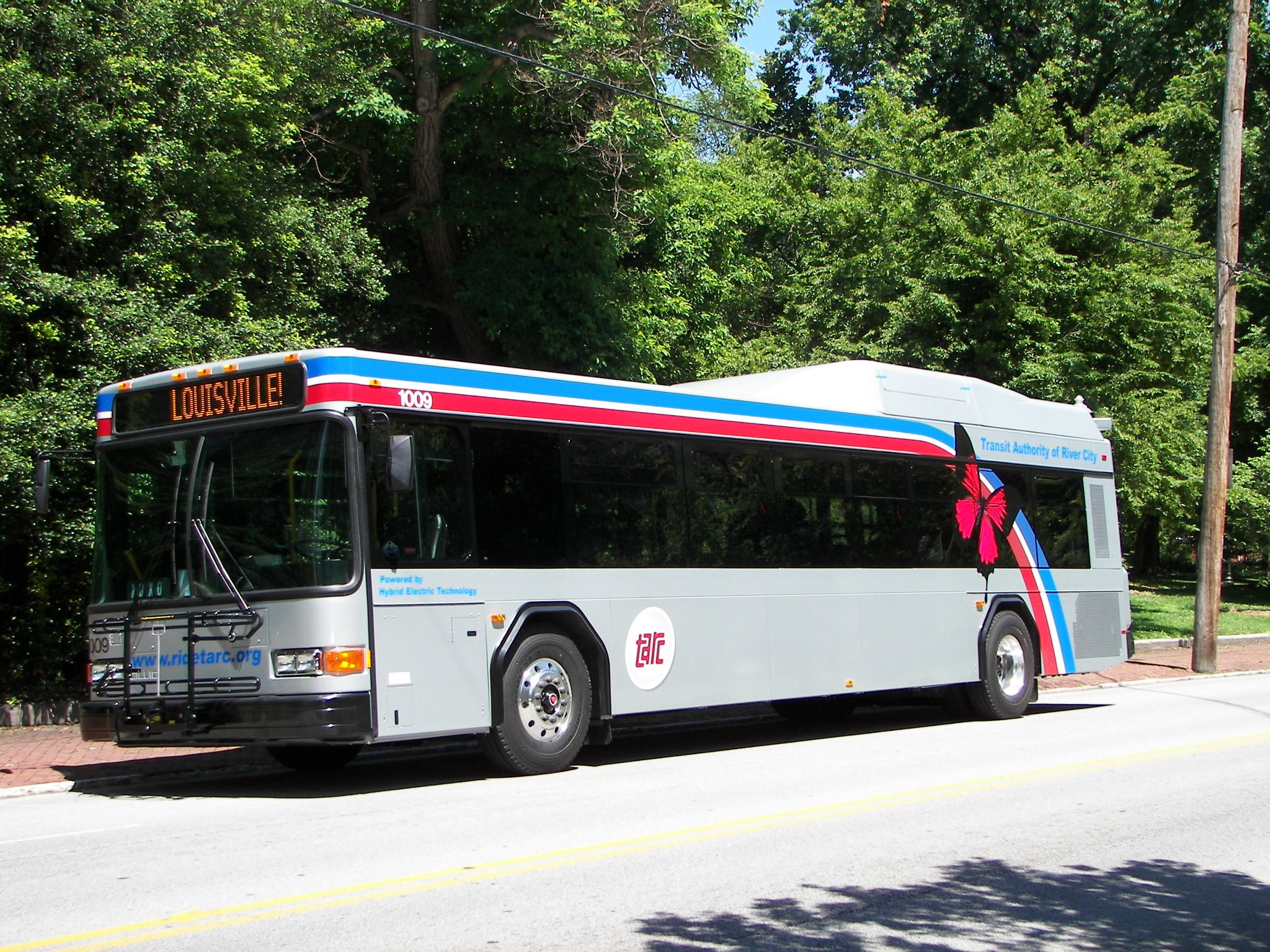
Diesel-electric hybrid Low Floors, such as this TARC bus, carry their traction batteries in an enclosure on the rear roof.

Since 2004, the Gillig Low Floor has been available in a diesel-electric hybrid configuration with the Cummins ISB engine; hybrid models are identified by their roof-mounted battery pack. Hybrid models have been produced with Allison, BAE, and Voith series- and parallel-hybrid powertrains. In 2008, the Allison hybrid drivetrain was 81% more expensive than a conventional bus, which was partially subsidized by federal grants and expected savings in fuel and maintenance costs.

The Gillig/Voith hybrid, branded DIWAhybrid, is a mild parallel hybrid system using Maxwell ultracapacitor on-board energy storage, and was tested to have an observed overall average fuel consumption of 4.75 mpg_{‑US} (49.5 L/100 km; 5.70 mpg_{‑imp}). The Gillig/BAE series hybrid, branded HybriDrive, had comparable fuel consumption, at 4.64 mpg_{‑US} (50.7 L/100 km; 5.57 mpg_{‑imp}) (40-foot) and 3.96–6.14 mpg_{‑US} (59.4–38.3 L/100 km; 4.76–7.37 mpg_{‑imp}) (40-foot, Manhattan and HD-UDDS driving cycles, respectively). The Gillig/Allison dual-mode (series/parallel) hybrid was similar, at 3.64–6.40 mpg_{‑US} (64.6–36.8 L/100 km; 4.37–7.69 mpg_{‑imp}) (40-foot (12.2 m), Manhattan and HD-UDDS driving cycles).

==== Battery electric ====
A fully electric configuration was introduced in 2019, with serial production commencing in 2020; it was developed as a prototype at the request of Big Blue Bus, (who was the lead customer for the model) which had reduced an order of 20 CNG buses to 19 in order to test an all-electric powertrain system developed by Cummins (branded "Cummins Battery Electric System"). The buses use plug-in charging with a SAE J1772 CCS Type 1 connector, and an overhead pantograph (SAE J3105–1) connection is available.

As tested by the Bus Research and Testing Center in Altoona, a 40-foot (12.2 m) battery-electric bus, with a gross capacity of 444 kW-hr (355 kW-hr usable) at 750 VDC, achieved a range of 129 to 187 mi (208 to 301 km), depending on the driving cycle (Manhattan and EPA HD-UDDS, respectively; the Orange County cycle fell in between). Observed energy consumption was 3.04 kW⋅h/mi (11.1 mpg‑e) (Manhattan), 2.27 kW⋅h/mi (14.8 mpg‑e) (Orange County), and 2.09 kW⋅h/mi (16.1 mpg‑e) (HD-UDDS). The Cummins TM4 traction motor had a rated output of 262.5 to 562.5 kW (352 to 754 hp).

==== Trolleybus ====
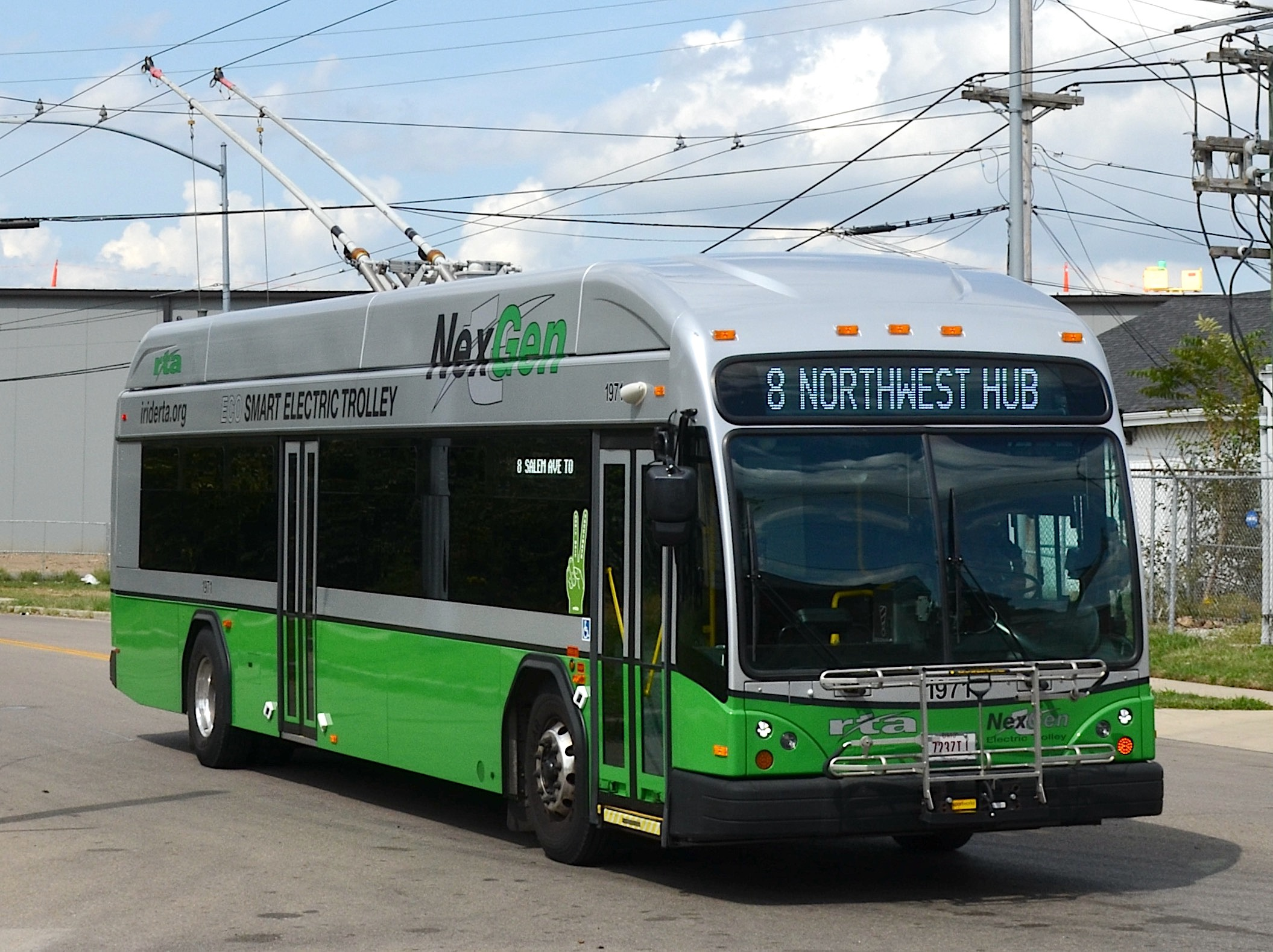
A BRTPlus trolleybus operating for the Dayton RTA

Gillig partnered with Kiepe Electric to build 45 "NexGen" trolleybuses for the Greater Dayton Regional Transit Authority (RTA); Gillig was responsible for the chassis, based on the Low Floor BRT/CNG, and Kiepe supplied the traction motor, battery, and trolley pole equipment. The contract was awarded by RTA in 2013 and the resulting buses featured "in-motion charging," using the trolley wires to charge an onboard battery that provided an off-wire range of up to 20 mi (32 km). This meant that buses could detour around stalled traffic and the system could be expanded without installing more overhead wire; to facilitate off-wire operation, the driver could move the poles up and down without leaving their seat. Four prototypes were supplied in 2014: two used diesel engines to operate off-wire, while the other two used storage batteries. The remaining 41 would be equipped with storage batteries; the prototypes would be tested for more than five years before the first of the 41 regular production models arrived in August 2019. The final bus was delivered in September 2020.

==== Hydrogen Fuel Cell ====
Announced in 2024 with production beginning in 2026, this variant comes in two variants with ranges of either 320 or 375 miles (515 or 604 km) using Ballard fuel cells.

== See also ==
- List of buses

Competing models

- New Flyer Low Floor
- New Flyer Xcelsior
- Nova Bus LFS
- NABI LFW
- ENC Axess
- Proterra ZX5
- Neoplan Transliner
- Grande West Vicinity
