= Cummins L-series engine =

Cummins L series
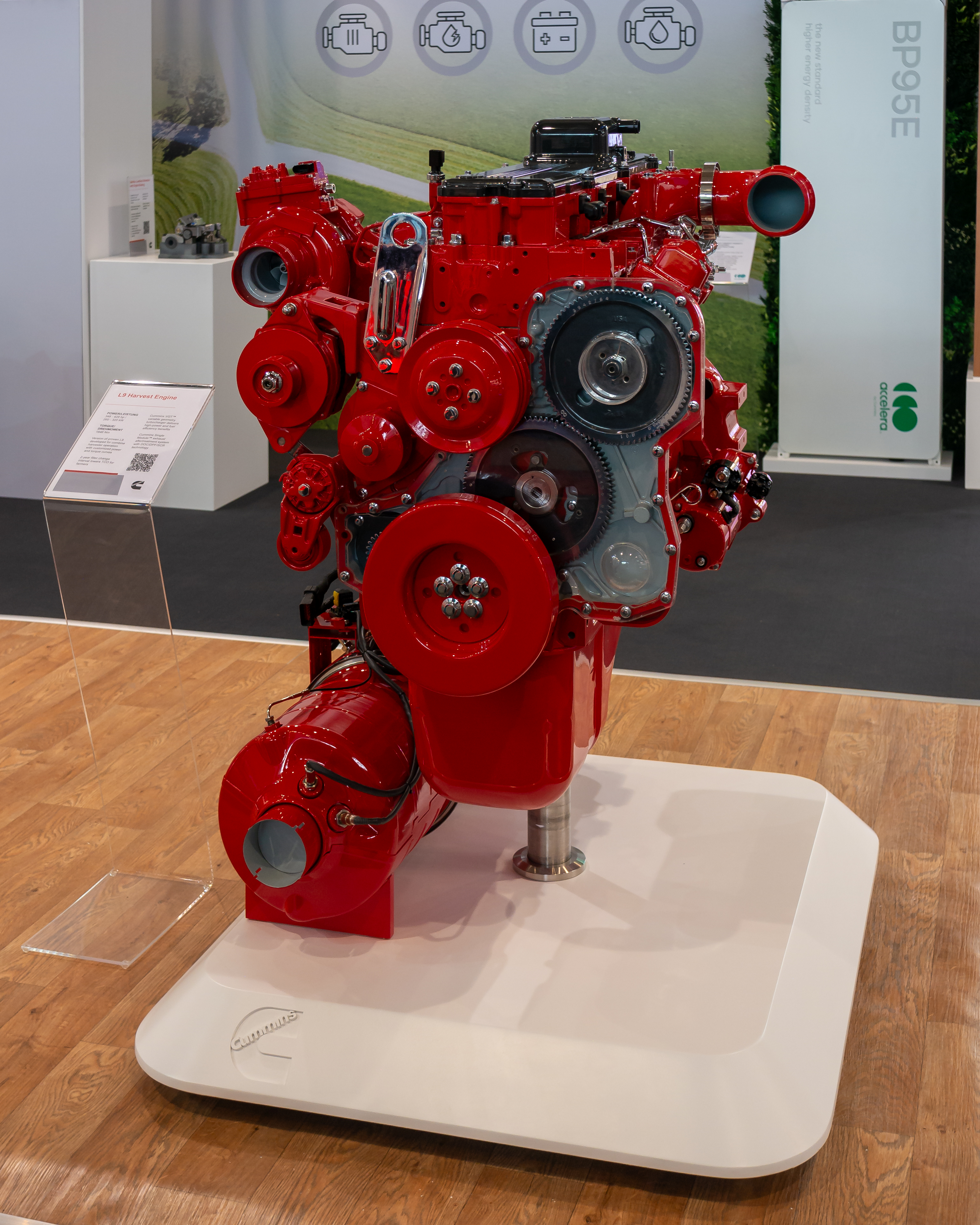
- Cummins L9

Overview
- Manufacturer: Cummins
- Also called: ISL, L Gas Plus, ISL G, ISL9, L9, L9N
- Production: 1982–present

Layout
- Configuration: Straight-six diesel engine
- Displacement: 8.9 litres (543.1 cu in), except for L10, which is 10 litres (610.2 cu in)
- Cylinder block material: Cast iron
- Cylinder head material: Cast iron
- Valvetrain: OHV

Combustion
- Turbocharger: Single-turbo
- Management: mechanical
- Fuel type: Diesel, natural gas
- Oil system: Wet sump
- Cooling system: Water-cooled

Chronology
- Successor: Cummins X10

Cummins has used the designation L for several engines, some of which are of unrelated design. The Cummins L-series engine is a straight-six diesel engine designed and produced by Cummins. It displaces 8.9 litres (543.1 cu in), and began production in 1982 as the L10 at the Jamestown Engine Plant in Jamestown, New York. After lengthening its stroke from 136 to 147 mm, its displacement was enlarged to 10.8 litres and the engine renamed M11, later ISM. The ISL 9 and L9 engines are not related to the L10 engine, but instead based on the smaller C-series engine, with the 135 mm stroke of the C8.3 enlarged to 144.5 mm, together with 4 valves per cylinder, giving it 8.9 litres displacement.

The L10 displaces 10.0 litres (610.2 cu in), and was available in either a vertical form, for upright use in trucks and buses, or horizontal form, for underfloor use in buses and trains. The L10 was Cummins's first competitive offering in the British bus market, as their earlier production had been too large and heavy. However, its high oil consumption and leaking gave it a troublesome introduction to the British market.

By 1994, it had been developed into the M11, and in 1998, Cummins ceased production of the old L-series engine. After the L10 was modified into the M11, the ISL9 was introduced to operate in the same market segment as the L10 had, yet with a better power-to-weight ratio, by enlarging the piston stroke of the older C8.3 engine. The Cummins L10 also has a sister engine which runs on compressed natural gas (CNG). That engine was introduced in 1992 as the L10G, then replaced by the L Gas Plus in 2001, and then by the ISL G, which is based on the C-series engine, in collaboration with Westport Innovations in 2008. The ISL engines were manufactured at plants in Rocky Mount, North Carolina and Darlington, England.

In 2016 onwards, the name ISL9 was simplified to L9. This L9, which is a stroked version of the C8.3 engine, bears no resemblance to the L10. The M11 engine is a stroked version of the L10.

In February 2023, Cummins announced that both the L9 and the X12 would be replaced by the X10 engine, which is slated for introduction in 2026 for the North American market.

== Models ==
Maker	Name	Displacement	Fuel	Years in production	Found in
Cummins	L10	10L	Diesel	1982–1998	Rigid transit buses; Articulated Farm Tractors
Cummins	ISL	8.9L	Diesel	1999–2007	Rigid transit buses; Articulated transit buses; Diesel-electric hybrid motorcoaches; Rear-engine Type D school buses
Cummins	ISL9	8.9L	Diesel	2007–2017	Rigid transit buses; Articulated transit buses; Diesel-electric hybrid motorcoaches; Rear-engine Type D school buses
Cummins	L9	8.9L	Diesel	2017–present	Rigid transit buses; Articulated transit buses; Diesel-electric hybrid motorcoaches; Rear-engine Type D school buses
Cummins-Westport	L10G	10L	CNG	1992–2001	Rigid transit buses
Cummins-Westport	L Gas Plus	8.9L	Natural Gas	2001–2008	Rigid transit buses; Articulated transit buses; some CNG motorcoaches
Cummins-Westport	ISL G	8.9L	Natural Gas	2008–2018	Rigid transit buses; Articulated transit buses; some CNG motorcoaches
Cummins-Westport	ISL G NZ	8.9L	Natural Gas	2008–2018	Rigid transit buses; Articulated transit buses; some CNG motorcoaches
Cummins-Westport	L9N	8.9L	Natural Gas	2018–present	Rigid transit buses; Articulated transit buses; some CNG motorcoaches

== Popular power ratings ==
Diesel-powered urban bus

730 pound force-feet (990 N⋅m) at 1300 rpm, 250 horsepower (186 kW; 253 PS) electronically governed at 2200 rpm
900 pound force-feet (1,220 N⋅m) at 1300 rpm, 280 horsepower (209 kW; 284 PS) electronically governed at 2200 rpm
1,100 pound force-feet (1,491 N⋅m) at 1300 rpm, 330 horsepower (246 kW; 335 PS) electronically governed at 2200 rpm

Natural gas-powered urban bus (L Gas Plus, ISL G, ISL G NZ, L9N)

900 pound force-feet (1,220 N⋅m) at 1300 rpm, 280 horsepower (209 kW; 284 PS) electronically governed at 2000 rpm
860 pound force-feet (1,166 N⋅m) at 1300 rpm, 300 horsepower (224 kW; 304 PS) electronically governed at 2100 rpm
1,000 pound force-feet (1,356 N⋅m) at 1300 rpm, 320 horsepower (239 kW; 324 PS) electronically governed at 2000 rpm

Firetruck/motorhome/truck
1,050 pound force-feet (1,424 N⋅m) at 1300 rpm, 310 horsepower (231 kW; 314 PS) electronically governed at 2100 rpm
1,150 pound force-feet (1,559 N⋅m) at 1300 rpm, 330 horsepower (246 kW; 335 PS) electronically governed at 2100 rpm
1,200 pound force-feet (1,627 N⋅m) at 1300 rpm, 400 horsepower (298 kW; 406 PS) electronically governed at 2200 rpm
