= Westport Fuel Systems =

Canadian multinational vehicle drivetrain manufacturer

Westport Fuel Systems Inc.
- Formerly: Westport Innovations Inc. (1995-2016)
- Traded as: TSX: WPRT; Nasdaq: WPRT
- ISIN: CA9609085076
- Industry: Automotive part
- Predecessor: Fuel Systems Solutions
- Founded: March 20, 1995; 31 years ago
- Headquarters: Vancouver, British Columbia, Canada
- Area served: Worldwide
- Products: Automotive parts
- Subsidiaries: BRC Gas Equipment
- Website: www.wfsinc.com

Westport Fuel Systems Inc. (formerly Westport Innovations Inc.) is a Canadian company that develops alternative fuel, low-emissions technologies to allow engines to operate on clean-burning fuels such as compressed natural gas (CNG), liquefied natural gas (LNG), hydrogen and biofuels such as landfill gas.

Founded in 1995, the company is headquartered in Vancouver, British Columbia, and also has facilities in France, Sweden, Italy, China, Australia and the United States.

Westport is best known for its technology that allows the diesel engine to operate on natural gas without modifications to the engine's combustion chamber.

== History ==
In the early 1980s Philip Hill, then a University of British Columbia mechanical engineering professor, sought improvements to natural gas combustion in engines. Hill's team of graduate students and research engineers focused on natural gas as a fuel in diesel engines to reduce emissions of nitrogen oxides (NOx) and harmful atmospheric particulate matter. At the same time, he wanted to preserve the performance, fuel economy, durability and reliability characteristics of the traditional diesel engine.

With funding limited and finding few suitable commercial components or testing equipment, Hill and his team designed and fabricated their own components and equipment. The theoretical results they obtained from their research and experimentation was a significant factor in the later development of Westport.

By injecting a small amount of diesel fuel before a main, high-pressure, direct injection (HPDI) of natural gas to start the combustion, Hill was able to successfully retain important characteristics of the diesel engine.

In 1994, through UBC's University-Industry Liaison Office, Hill met David Demers, who later became Westport's CEO.

In 1995 the two founded Westport Innovations to capitalize on the HPDI technology.

In 2016 Westport Innovations merged with the American Fuel Systems Solutions and renamed Westport Fuel Systems.

=== Milestones ===
- 2001: Westport and Cummins formed a joint venture, Cummins Westport Inc, which now offers medium-duty natural gas vehicle engines from 150 to over 400 horsepower. Now used in over 60 OEM vehicles, over 30,000 of the engines have sold worldwide.
- 2005: Westport and Beijing Tianhai Industry Co. Ltd. began a relationship which led to forming a joint venture—BTIC Westport Inc.—to develop and market natural gas tanks for transportation.
- 2006: Westport HD Engine and LNG Fuel System for heavy-duty trucking applications was launched. The HPDI technology is based on the 15-litre Cummins ISX but is adaptable to other OEM engines as well.
- 2008: Westport formed a joint venture with Weichai Power, China's largest heavy-duty engine manufacturer, and Hong Kong Peterson (CNG) Equipment Ltd. Today Weichai Westport Inc. manufactures and sells alternative-fuel engines for automobiles, heavy-duty trucks, power generation and shipping applications. Westport listed on the NASDAQ Stock Market in 2008 as WPRT, while continuing to trade under WPT on the Toronto Stock Exchange.
- 2009: Westport and Volvo committed to a supply agreement for Westport natural gas fuel systems for commercializing Volvo heavy-duty applications.
- 2010: Juniper Engines Inc. (now Westport Light Duty Inc.) became a wholly owned subsidiary of Westport as a result of the acquisition of OMVL SpA in July 2010 and OMVL's 51% share of Juniper. Westport LD now offers natural gas and liquefied petroleum gas engines and fuel systems for the OEM light-duty automotive and industrial market.
- 2011: Westport acquired Emer SpA, a fuel system and components manufacturer, and AFV, a Swedish bi-fuel engine manufacturer and supplier of alternative fuel systems for Volvo Cars.
- In April, 2013 Cummins using technology developed by Westport Innovations began shipping large natural gas fueled engines to truck manufacturers in the United States as trucking companies began converting portions of their fleets to natural gas and the natural gas distribution network in the United States began to expand.

== See also ==
- Gasoline direct injection
- Fuel injection
