= New Flyer Invero =

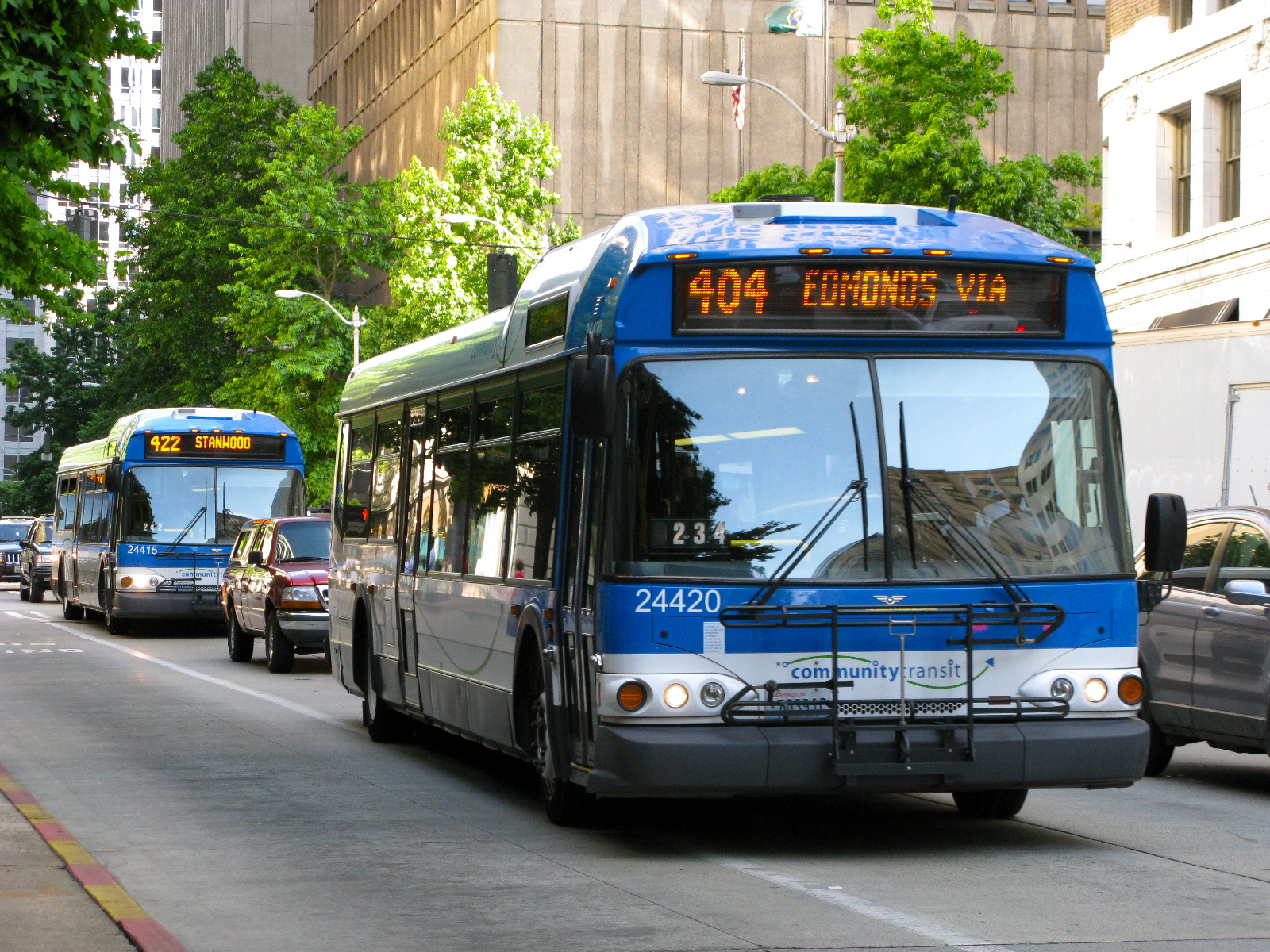
- Two Community Transit New Flyer D40i Inveros in downtown Seattle

Overview
- Manufacturer: New Flyer
- Production: 2002–2007

Body and chassis
- Class: Transit bus
- Body style: Monocoque stressed skin

Powertrain
- Engine: Cummins ISL
- Transmission: Allison B400 R

Dimensions
- Wheelbase: 285 in (7.24 m)
- Length: over bumpers: 41.25 ft (12.6 m)
- Width: 102 in (2.59 m)
- Height: 118.7 in (3.01 m) (diesel, over A/C)
- Curb weight: 27,600 lb (12,500 kg)

Chronology
- Predecessor: New Flyer Low Floor
- Successor: New Flyer Xcelsior

The New Flyer Invero (D40i) is a line of low-floor transit buses that was manufactured by New Flyer Industries between 1999 and 2007. Produced as a 40-foot (nominal) rigid bus, the Invero was typically sold with a conventional diesel combustion engine, although a few diesel-electric hybrids were built, integrated by Stewart & Stevenson. New Flyer introduced the Invero in 1999 with the intent that it would replace the preceding New Flyer Low Floor line, but few Inveros were sold, and the line was discontinued in 2007; in 2008, New Flyer introduced the Xcelsior, replacing both the Low Floor and the Invero lines.

== Design ==
Model Codes
Motive power	Length	Model
D = diesel DE = diesel-electric hybrid F or H = hydrogen fuel cell	40 = 40 feet (12 m); 60 = 60 feet (18 m) articulated	i = Invero

For example, a New Flyer D40i is a 40-foot (nominal) rigid Invero with diesel power. New Flyer never officially produced any diesel-electric hybrid Inveros, nor did they produce any articulated Inveros.

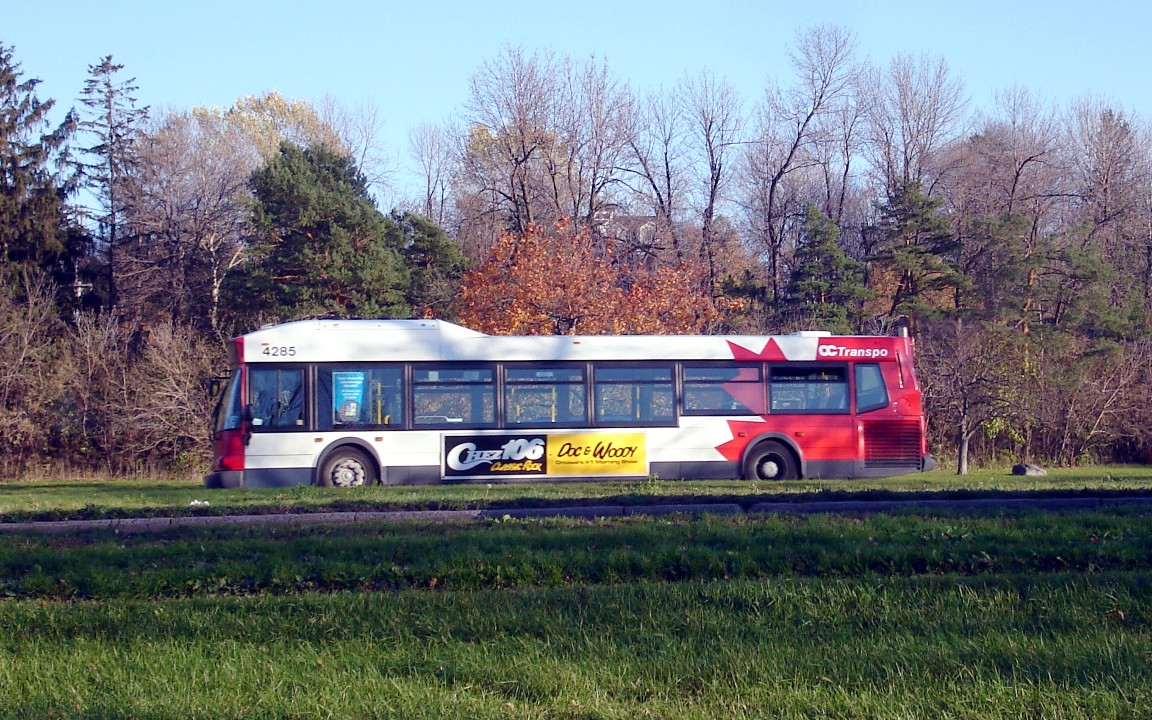
OC Transpo #4285 in profile, showing the "Beluga" elevated front roofline

Work on what would become the Invero started in 1997. A prototype Invero was first shown at the October 1999 APTA trade show in Orlando, Florida. Apart from the more streamlined exterior, other improvements over the existing Low Floor models included larger windows, improved heating, more seats, easier maintenance, and the use of composite materials to reduce weight. The driver's windshield has been shaped to reduce glare. The air conditioning unit has been moved to the front roof of the bus to allow for additional passenger seats in the rear of the bus. The resulting elevated front roofline has led some operators to affectionately dub the Inveros the "Beluga" bus, after the Beluga whale.

Financial difficulties delayed the development of the production Invero. New Flyer essentially was unable to sell buses for 18 months until late 2002 while the company was undergoing cash flow issues. New Flyer had a contract to provide 10 Inveros for evaluation to the city of Winnipeg in 2000 as part of a larger contract for 82 replacement buses; the 10 Inveros would be delivered as part of the initial batch of 30 buses and would undergo a long-term test to determine if the remaining 52 should be ordered as Inveros, to be delivered in 2001 and 2002. However, the evaluation Inveros would not have been ready before late summer 2002, and Winnipeg negotiated a settlement to receive conventional D40LF models instead.

=== Hybrids ===
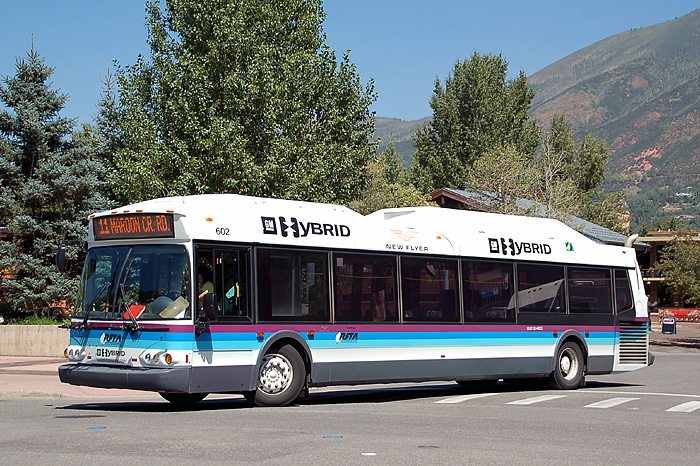
New Flyer/S&S/GM Hybrid DE40i, RFTA #602

In 2003, New Flyer publicized the sales win for a planned articulated bus hybrid Invero variant, designated DE60i, by displaying the image on its home page. The hybrid Invero variant was scheduled to enter service in August 2006. Four Inveros were converted to diesel-electric hybrid propulsion by Stewart & Stevenson for the Roaring Fork Transportation Authority and delivered in November 2005; New Flyer was unwilling to perform the engineering required to integrate the hybrid drivetrain (manufactured by GM Allison) for the small order. The cost of each hybrid bus was US$585,000 (equivalent to $964,000 in 2025), compared to US$350,000 (equivalent to $577,000 in 2025) for the conventional D40i.

=== Fuel cell ===
A hydrogen fuel cell Invero was demonstrated in Winnipeg during the summer of 2006. The fuel cell Invero was integrated by Hydrogenics using their HyPM 65 fuel cell power modules; in-wheel electric motors from Siemens, installed by ISE Corporation; ultra-capacitors from Maxwell Technologies; and roof-mounted hydrogen storage tanks from Dynetek Industries of Calgary. The system had a continuous rated output of 180 kW (240 hp) with a peak output of 350 kW (470 hp) and a range of approximately 6 to 8 hours. Refueling for the demonstration was performed at Red River College. Development of the fuel cell Invero had started in late 2002, and was largely supported by Natural Resources Canada, which contributed CA$3,000,000 (equivalent to $4,600,000 in 2025) for the project.

== Deployment ==
The first New Flyer Invero D40i was completed at the St. Cloud plant on May 7, 2002, and was the first of six ordered for the St. Catharines Transit Authority. The Invero also entered revenue service for Burlington Transit by 2003. The first United States transit agency to order the Invero was Community Transit, serving Snohomish County, Washington, near Seattle; the first Community Transit bus rolled off the line at St. Cloud on January 11, 2005. Community Transit ordered 33 buses, which entered service in mid-2005. OC Transpo in Ottawa was the largest customer for the Invero.

In 2003, the Lane Transit District serving Eugene, Oregon announced plans to implement a bus rapid transit system using six DE60i 60-foot articulated Inveros (then designated DE60iLF-BRT, emphasizing the low-floor design and bus rapid transit intentions), to be delivered in August 2006. However, in July 2004, Lane announced they would be acquiring the Low Floor-based DE60LF-BRT (later designated DE60LFA) articulated buses instead.

As of 2024, OC Transpo is the last transit agency operating Inveros. Their units are nearing the ends of their service lives, and are gradually being replaced with Nova Bus LFS units.

== Competing models ==
- Gillig Low Floor
- New Flyer Low Floor
- Nova Bus LFS
- Orion VI
- Orion VII
- Neoplan AN440L
