= Neoplan Transliner =

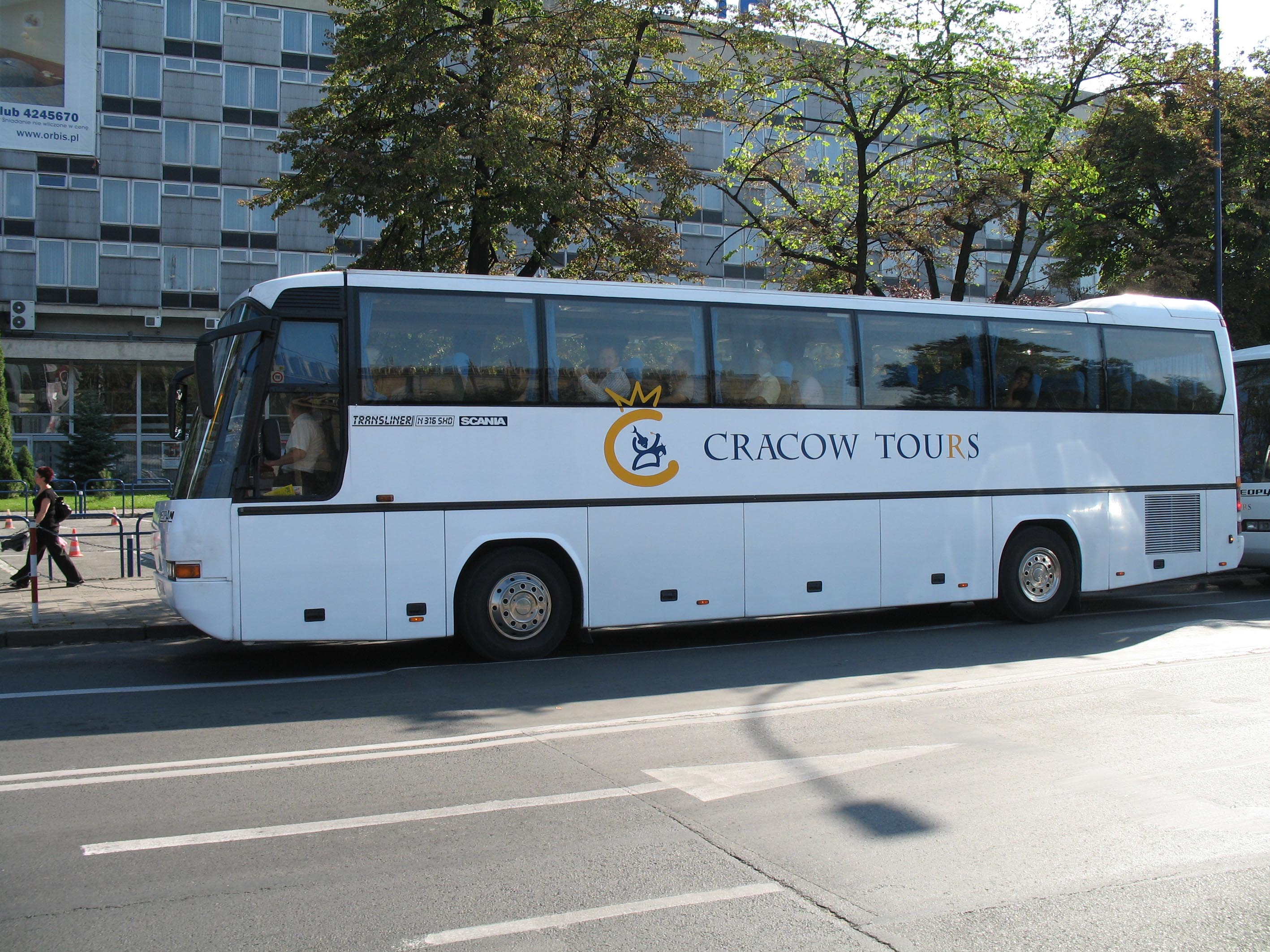

Overview
- Manufacturer: Neoplan Bus GmbH, subsidy of MAN Nutzfahrzeuge AG
- Also called: N 316
- Production: 1990s

Body and chassis
- Class: Commercial vehicle
- Body style: Single-deck inter-urban coach
- Layout: Rear-engine design
- Doors: 1 door or 2 doors
- Floor type: Step entrance

Powertrain
- Engine: Diesel engine

The Neoplan Transliner in Europe is a single-decker inter-urban coach and rental coach built by Neoplan Bus GmbH for the European market in 1990s, of either a single-axle or multi-axle bus design. Some Dennis Javelin and MAN coaches in the United Kingdom also have the Transliner bodywork.

== American market ==
A transit bus was marketed in the United States as the Neoplan USA Transliner, built by Neoplan USA with the model designations AN430, AN435, AN440 and AN460 for nominal body lengths ranging from 30 to 60 feet (9 to 18 m) corresponding to the last two digits in the model number (AN4xx). It was first marketed in 1982 and was sold until the manufacturer declared bankruptcy in 2006. These buses were offered with a variety of different engines, wheelchair lifts, or low floor variants.

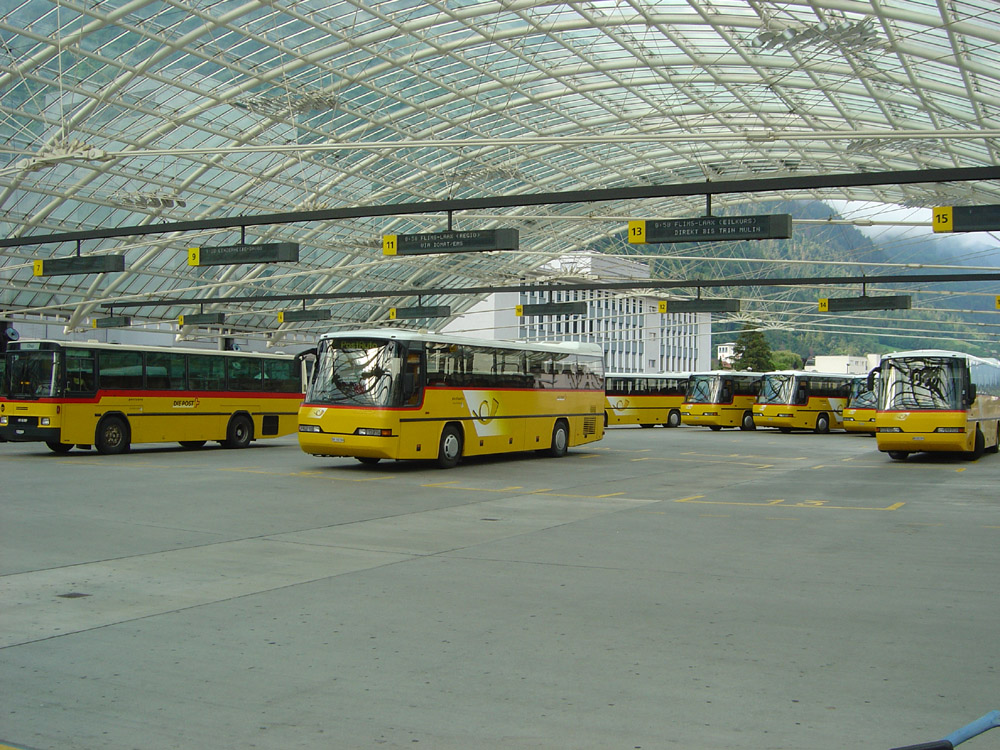
A fleet of Neoplan Transliners in the Swiss "Postautos" colours

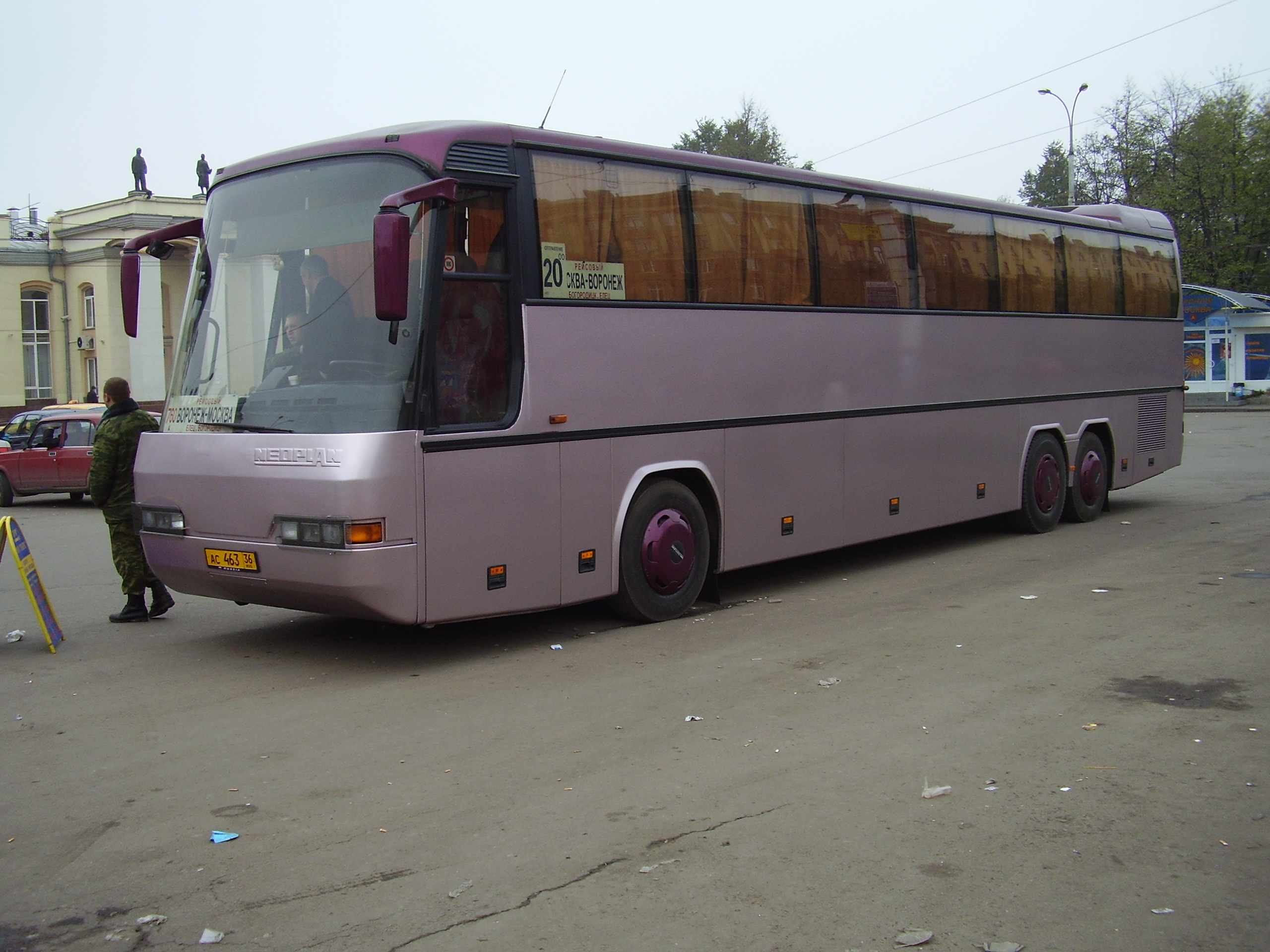
Neoplan N 316/3 Voronezh - Moscow

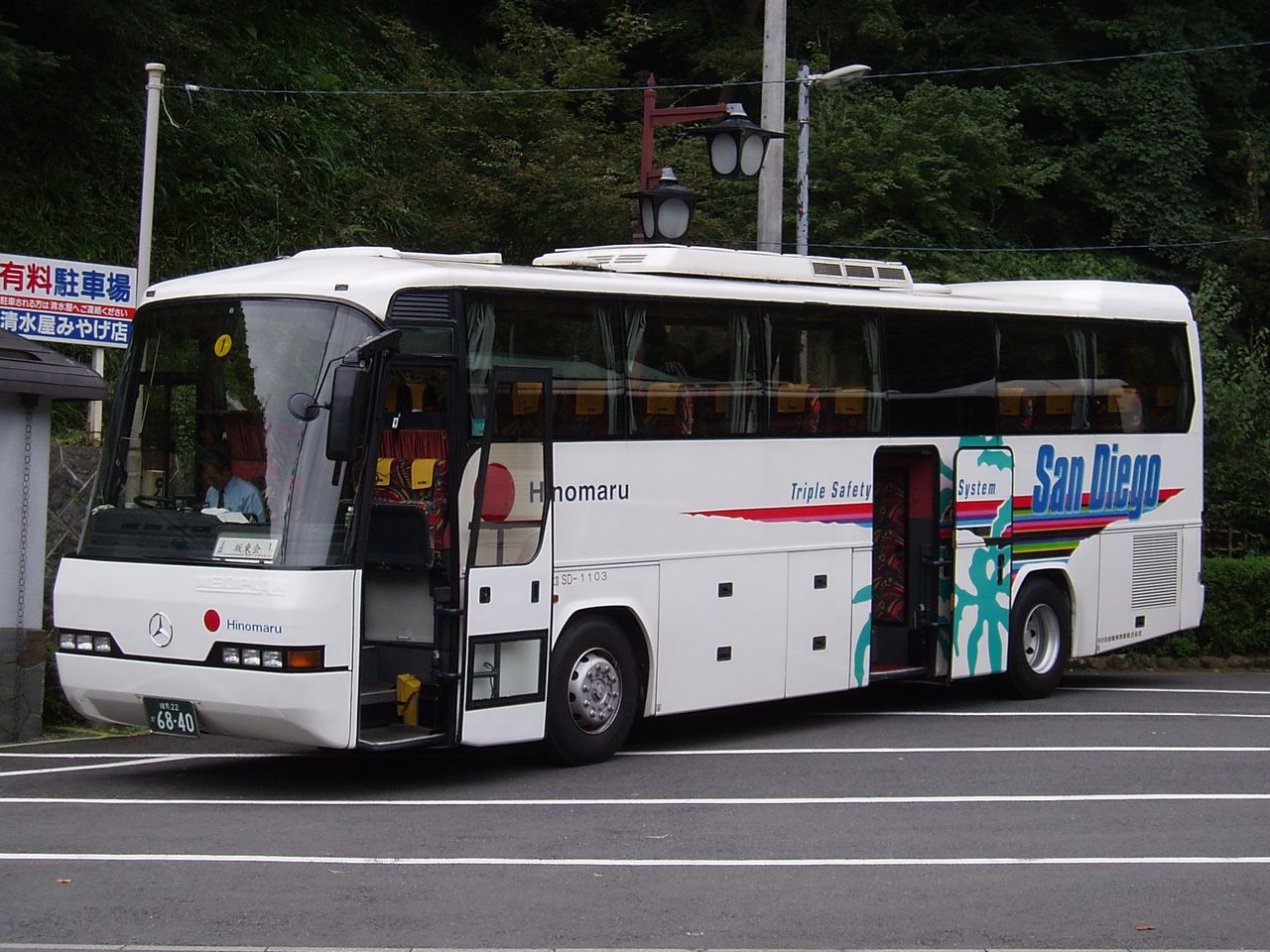
A Mercedes-badged Neoplan N 316/2

== Indonesian version ==
The Indonesian version is built by coachbuilder Adiputro Wirasejati but based on the model under license from Neoplan Bus GmbH, and uses a Mercedes-Benz OH 1521 chassis.
