= Neoplan Transliner (North America) =

Public transport single-decker bus model

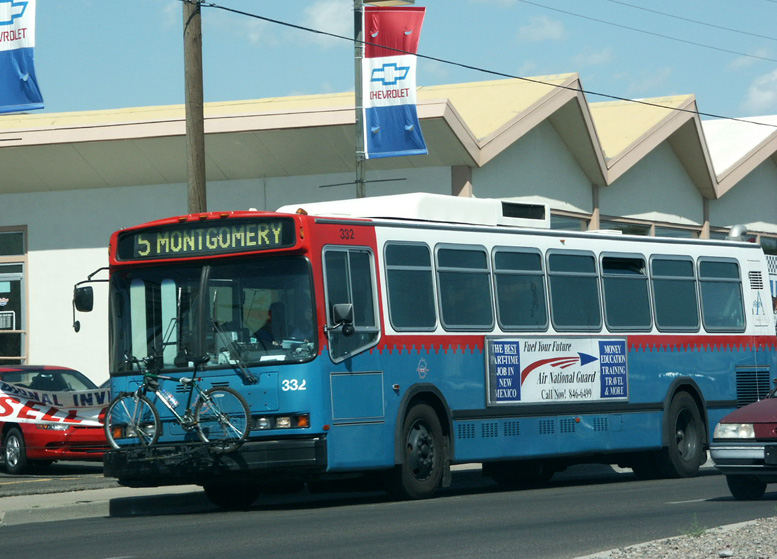
- A CNG-powered high floor AN440A operating in Albuquerque, New Mexico.

Overview
- Manufacturer: Neoplan USA

Body and chassis
- Doors: 1, 2 or 3
- Floor type: Step entrance Semi low-floor Full low-floor
- Chassis: Integral

Dimensions
- Length: 26 to 60 ft (8 to 18 m)
- Width: 96 or 102 in (2 or 3 m)
- Height: 3.0m

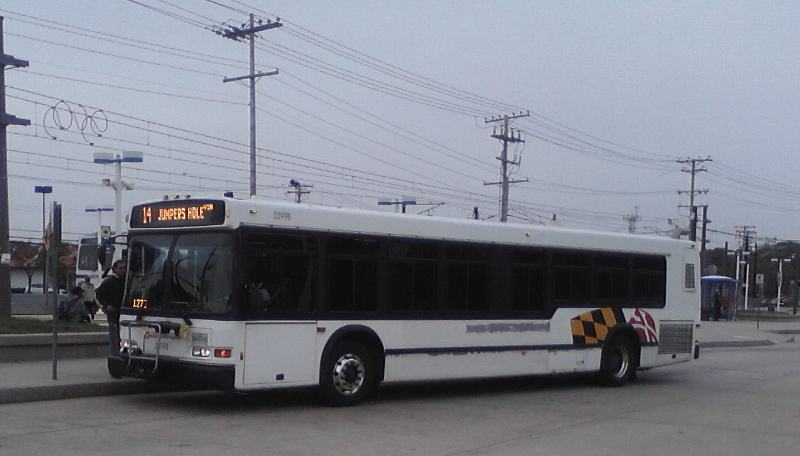
A 2002 Diesel AN440LF low-floor variant of the MTA Maryland; became latest version fabricated.

The Neoplan Transliner is a series of related public transport single-decker bus models introduced by Neoplan USA in 1981 and produced until the company declared bankruptcy in 2006. It was available in various lengths ranging from 26 ft (8 m) to 60 ft (18 m) articulated (nominal lengths), and was marketed against the Rapid Transit Series, Flxible Metro, Gillig Phantom, New Flyer High Floor, and Orion I.

== Models ==
The Neoplan USA Transliner was available in a wide variety of body styles. Transliner could be ordered in 26', 30', 35', 40', and 60' lengths. Standard (high), completely low, or semi-low (with steps to access the rear section after the rear doors) floors were available.

An unrelated over-the-road coach was marketed by Neoplan GmbH starting in the 1990s for the European market, also named Transliner.

Neoplan Transliner (US) Model Numbers
Nom. length	Std. (high) floor	Low floor	
Nom. length	Std. (high) floor	Semi (Note: Low front section, high rear section behind rear doors.)	Full
26-foot	AN408		
30-foot	AN430		
35-foot	AN435	AN435LF	
40-foot	AN440	AN440LF	AN440TLF
45-foot			AN445TLF
60-foot (artic.)	AN460	AN460LF	

Notes

Originally, the Transliner could only be ordered in standard (high) floor form. The low-floor variants were introduced in 1999, with Port Authority of Allegheny County (PAT) being the lead agency for mass-produced examples. The "true low floor" variants (AN440TLF and AN445TLF) were also known as Intraliners, available in 40-and-45-foot-long (12 and 14 m) nominal lengths and mostly used by airports.

Unique variants included the AN440LF-ETB trolleybuses produced for Massachusetts Bay Transportation Authority (MBTA), featuring a third passenger door on the street (driver's) side, the DMA-460LF dual-mode buses for the Silver Line (MBTA) with trolley poles and a diesel engine, the AN440/3 3-axle variant with a dead third axle for Los Angeles County Metropolitan Transportation Authority (LACMTA), and the 1-foot (0.30 m) shortened AN460RC (aka AN459) built for New Jersey Transit (NJT).

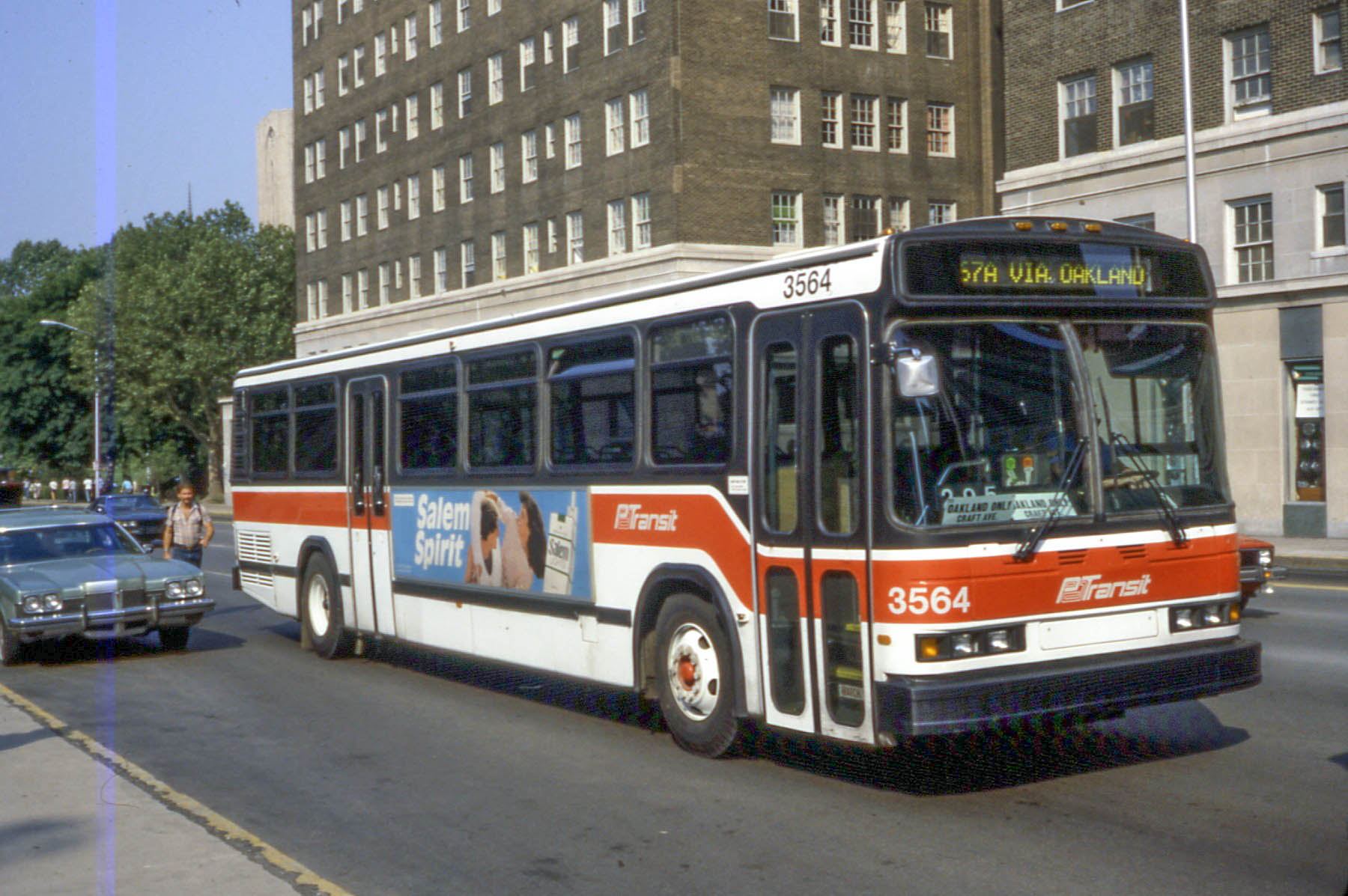
PAT #3564, AN440 from the 1982 PennDOT pooled order

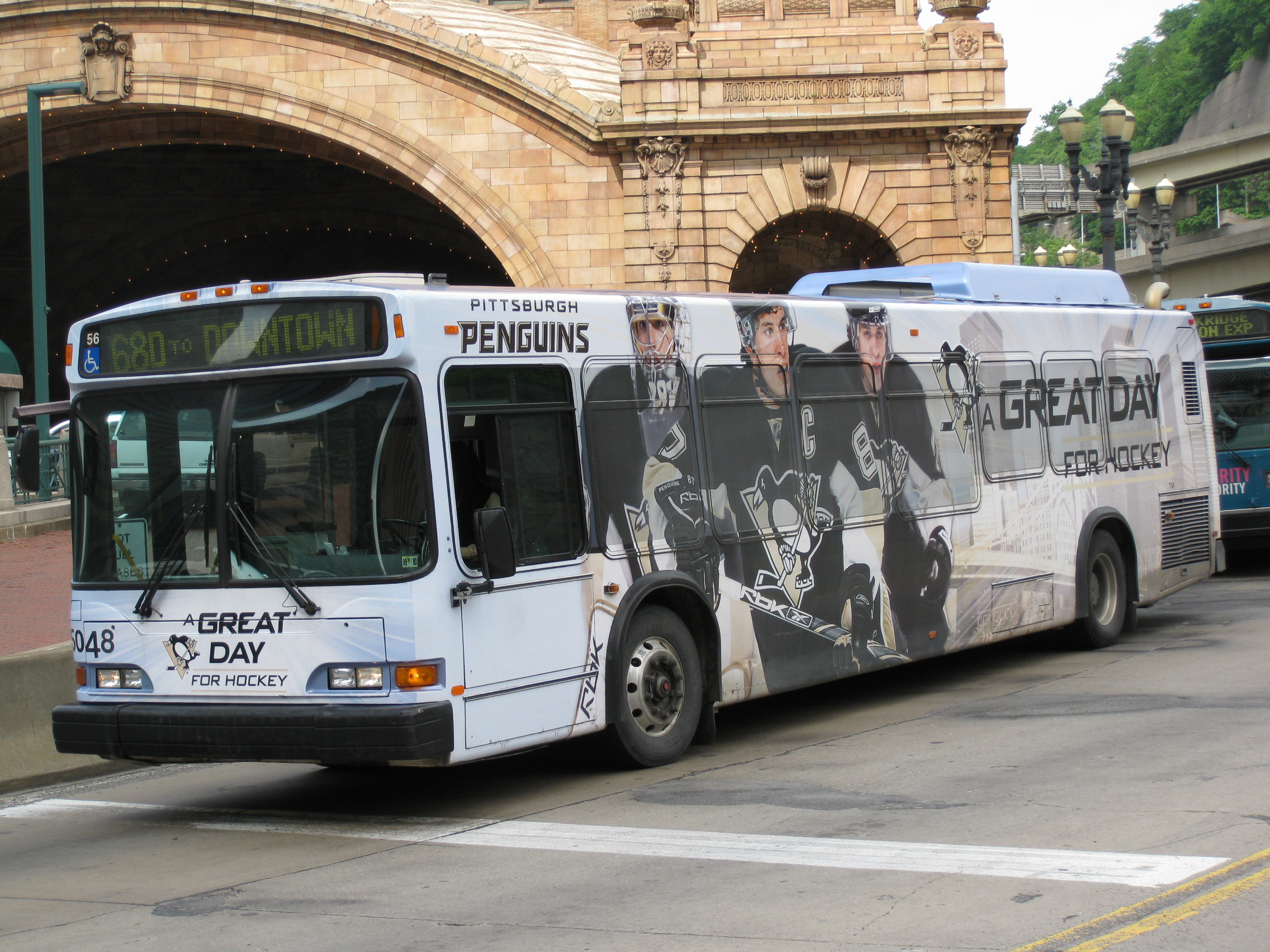
PAT #5048, AN440LF from first mass-produced order of low-floor Neoplan USA buses

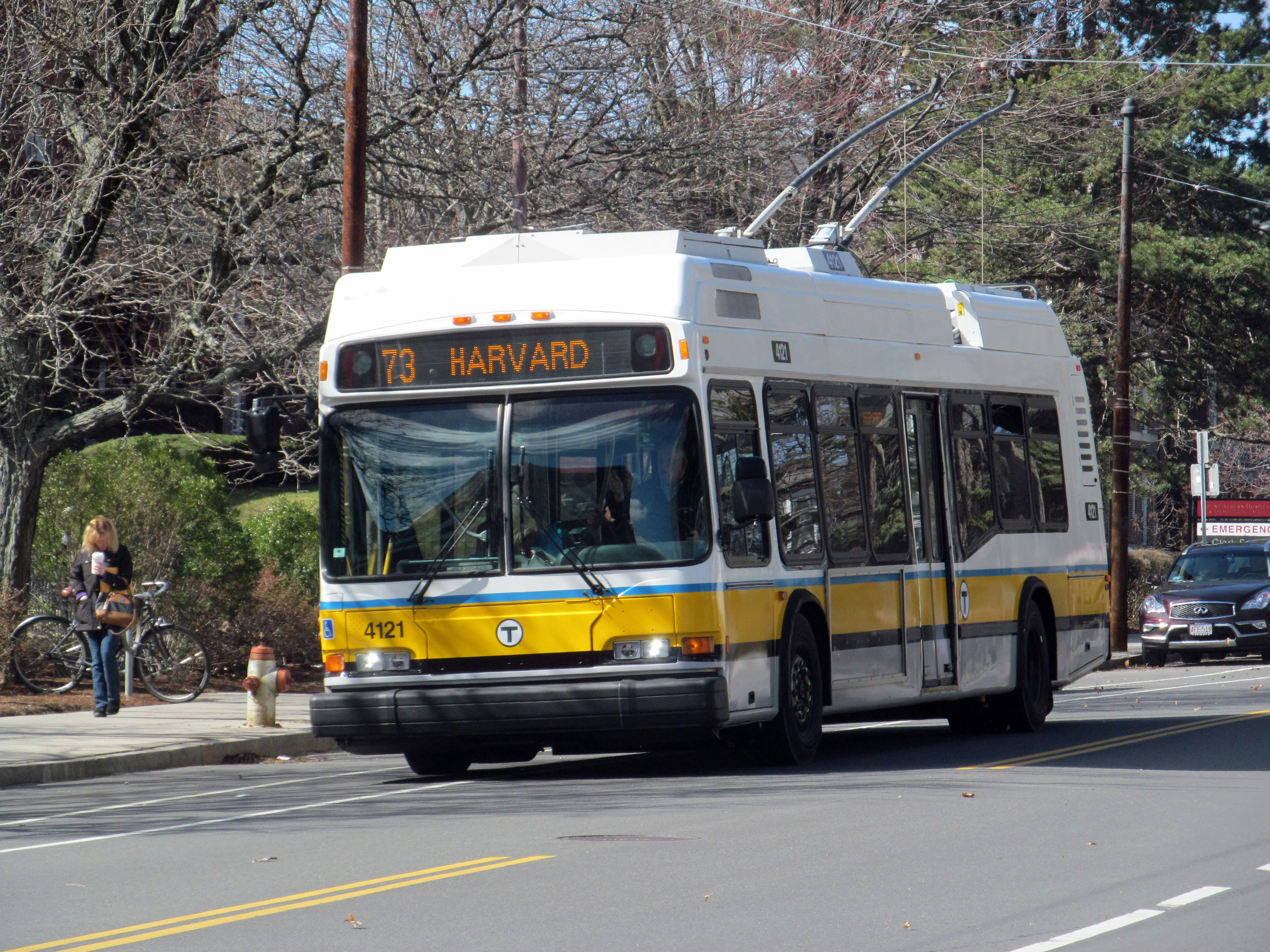
MBTA #4121, AN440LF-ETB trolleybus; note streetside door

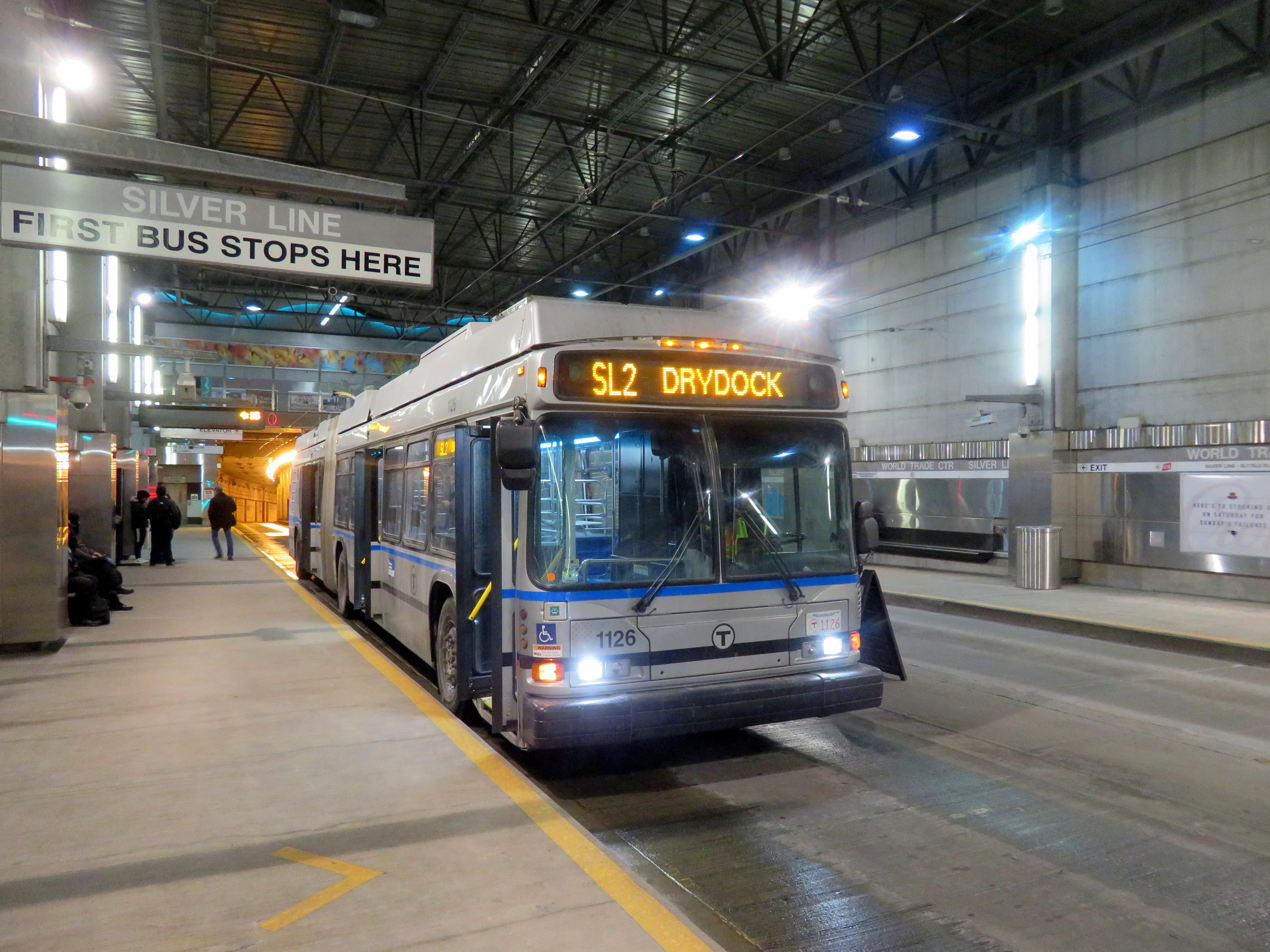
MBTA #1126, dual-mode DMA-460LF with trolley poles raised

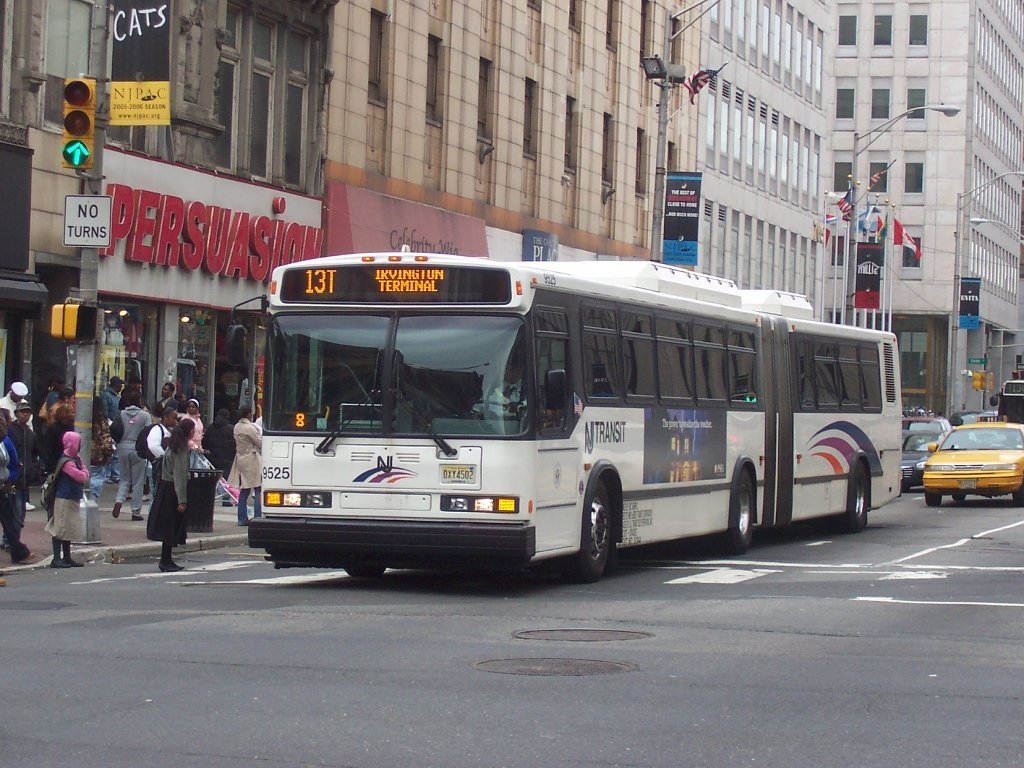
NJT #9525, shortened AN460RC (AN459)

=== Design ===
Neoplan Transliner and Intraliner
			Transliner						Intraliner	
			AN435	AN435LF	AN440	AN440LF	AN460	AN460LF	AN440TLF	AN445TLF
Dimensions		Length (Note: Nominal)	35 ft (11 m)		40 ft (12 m)		60 ft (18 m)		40 ft (12 m)	45 ft (14 m)
Dimensions		Width	96 or 102 in (2.4 or 2.6 m)	102 in (2.6 m)	96 or 102 in (2.4 or 2.6 m)	102 in (2.6 m)				
Dimensions		Height	120 to 132 in (3.0 to 3.4 m)	115 to 127 in (2.9 to 3.2 m)	120 to 132 in (3.0 to 3.4 m)	115 to 127 in (2.9 to 3.2 m)	120 to 130 in (3.0 to 3.3 m)	115 to 135 in (2.9 to 3.4 m)	127 in (3.2 m) (max)	
Dimensions		Wheelbase	205.75 in (5.2 m)	?	266 in (6.8 m)	274 in (7.0 m)	F: 209.19 in (5.3 m); R: 297.19 in (7.5 m) (Note: AN460RC/AN459 is F: 237 in (6.0 m) and R: 253 in (6.4 m))	F: 222 in (5.6 m); R: 285.75 in (7.3 m)	274 in (7.0 m)	?
Drivetrain	Engines	DD S40	Yes	Yes	Yes	Yes	No	No	No	No
Drivetrain	Engines	DD S50	Yes	Yes	Yes	Yes	Yes	Yes	Yes	Yes
Drivetrain	Engines	DD S60	No	No	No	No	Yes	Yes	No	No
Drivetrain	Engines	Cummins ISL	No	No	No	No	Yes	Yes	No	No
Drivetrain	Engines	Cummins ISM	Yes	No	Yes	No	Yes	Yes	No	No
Drivetrain	Engines	Cummins C Series	Yes	Yes	Yes	Yes	No	No	Yes	Yes
Drivetrain	Engines	CAT C-9	No	No	No	MBTA Only	Yes	Yes	No	No
Drivetrain	Transmissions		Allison World B400 or B500				Allison World B500, ZF / Voith optional		ZF 5HP590	
Axles		Front	Neoplan IFS + Meritor axle hubs	Meritor FH-946	Neoplan IFS + Meritor axle hubs	Meritor FH-946	Neoplan IFS + Meritor axle hubs	Meritor, ZF or MAN optional	Meritor FH-946	
Axles		Middle	—N/a				Neoplan IFS + Meritor axle hubs	Meritor, ZF or MAN optional	—N/a	
Axles		Rear	Meritor 61000-series	Meritor RC-26-633	Meritor 61000-series	Meritor RC-26-633	Meritor 61100-series	Meritor, ZF or MAN optional	Meritor RC-26-720 or ZF V9-65L-131	

==== Construction ====
Self-supporting monocoque steel construction made of seamless square steel tubes, electrically welded. Exterior roof and side wall panels are of double galvanized steel, sealed to the skeleton with a combination of spot welding and gluing. Stainless steel wheelhousings and stepwells.

==== Seating ====
Depending on the model and length, seats were offered for up to 37 (AN440LF), 43 (AN440), or 65 passengers (AN460/AN460LF).

==== Engines ====
NeoPlan offered a variety of engines, both diesel and CNG fueled. Depending upon the model, Detroit Diesel Series 40, 50, or the 6V92TA; Cummins ISM, C-series, or ISL; or CAT C-9 engines could also be had. Most Transliners featured Allison B400 or B500 "World Transmissions". However, ZF (4HP590) and Voith transmissions were also available on some models. To note, Massachusetts Bay Transportation Authority ordered AN440LFs with Caterpillar (CAT) C9s, and one unit (#0488) was retrofitted with a ISL engine.

== History ==
The first transit buses sold by Neoplan USA were based on the Neoplan N 416 buses developed for VöV under the Standard-Linienbus program. Accordingly, the first buses ordered from Neoplan USA were called the Atlantis and internally N-416-xx (with xx designating nominal length in feet); these were purchased by Metropolitan Atlanta Rapid Transit Authority (MARTA, 50× 40-foot models) and Milwaukee County Transit System (MCTS, 26× 40-foot and 18× 35-foot models) and delivered in 1981 and 1982.

Neoplan USA was also offering the "Advanced Design" N412 bus to compete with the GM Rapid Transit Series and Flxible Metro. By 1982, these buses had been given the name "Transliner" and the model numbers had been established as the AN435 and AN440 (for American Neoplan, Model 4, 35 or 40-foot lengths, respectively). Significant early Transliner sales included 1,000 buses to 16 transit agencies in the state of Pennsylvania, coordinated by PennDOT in 1982, which was the largest single bus contract in the U.S. to date, 50 articulated buses to MARTA, 76 buses to Washington Metropolitan Area Transit Authority (WMATA) in 1983, 60 buses to AC Transit, and 415 buses to LACMTA, then operating as the Southern California Rapid Transit District (SCRTD), in 1984 to support crowds expected for the 1984 Summer Olympics.

Pennsylvania won a commitment from Neoplan USA to build an assembly plant in the state as a condition to fulfill the order; Neoplan USA announced its intent to add a Pennsylvania factory in 1982 and revealed a scale model of the site chosen in Honey Brook in 1984, but assembled all of the Pennliners in Lamar due to the delivery deadlines. The first bus completed for PAT, #3500, has been preserved by the Antique Motor Coach Association of Pennsylvania since March 2000. Although the Honey Brook site assembled buses briefly in 1986, it would later become the headquarters of Neopart, Neoplan USA's part distribution operation. A third Neoplan USA factory operated for approximately a year from June 2001 to June 2002 in Brownsville, Texas.

=== Issues ===
Joseph Alexander, a member of the WMATA board, criticized the 1983 contract award to Neoplan USA; Alexander was also serving as the president of the American Public Transportation Association (APTA), which had received negative feedback from MCTS. One MCTS official called Neoplan USA "totally disorganized" and lacking quality control. Cracks were discovered in the frames of WMATA and SCRTD buses in 1984, and those agencies suspended service with their Neoplan USA buses in 1985, just ahead of a nationwide voluntary recall in March. That recall was also driven by a December 1984 incident where a faulty defroster on a WMATA bus led to an electrical fire and subsequent evacuation.

The PennDOT buses, nicknamed "Pennliners", also were prone to premature corrosion, as experienced by the Port Authority of Allegheny County (PAT). Extensive corrosion issues led to a $1.7 million settlement between Neoplan USA and PAT in 1990.

Another PAT order for low-floor AN440LF buses, which were delivered starting in August 1999, were pulled from service by September 2000 for frame cracks. During federally mandated STURAA testing in 1994–95, a prototype AN440LF experienced extensive frame and suspension cracking. Neoplan USA entered an agreement to pay for all frame repairs to the low-floor models. Multiple AN440LF buses delivered to the Massachusetts Bay Transportation Authority in 2005 were damaged by the same pothole; traveling over the pothole cracked the torque rods connecting the suspension and steering, and two crashes occurred as a direct consequence of steering issues. Additional cracks in suspension components were discovered in 2006 and 2007.

== Deployment ==
The 40-foot buses were made for over 50 transportation networks all over the United States. The bus networks that have or have had them in service include MBTA in Boston, SEPTA in Philadelphia, WMATA in Washington, D.C., ABQ RIDE in Albuquerque, New Mexico, and LACMTA in Los Angeles.

=== Pennsylvania ===
In late 1983 through 1985, Neoplan USA delivered the order for over 1,000 "Pennliner" buses for the Pennsylvania. The 1982 contract was a pooled purchase from 16 different transit agencies, with the majority going to SEPTA in Philadelphia (450) and Port Authority of Allegheny County (PAT) in Pittsburgh (410).

==== Philadelphia ====
By 1989, SEPTA, the largest transportation network in Pennsylvania, had purchased a cumulative total of 1,092 Neoplan AN435 and AN440 buses. As they aged, they were replaced by American Ikarus and New Flyer Low Floor buses that entered service between 1996 and 2005. The remaining 35 Neoplan AN440s (EZ models) were sent to the SEPTA Frankford Depot to temporarily replace the 1979 AM General Trolleybuses that were retired in 2004; the AN440s in turn were retired on June 20, 2008, after the final delivery of the replacement New Flyer E40LFR trolleybuses.

SEPTA also ordered 155 Neoplan AN460s from 1998–2000 to replace their aging Volvo B10M articulated buses and about 60 AN460 high floor buses were in service until 2017, when they were replaced by Novabus LFS Artic articulated buses.

==== Pittsburgh ====
PAT received its first Pennliners in October 1982; the agency later ordered AN460s (articulated) and AN440LFs (low-floor) versions from Neoplan USA.

PAT retired its last two Neoplan buses (AN460s) in December 2019 by providing free rides around downtown Pittsburgh for one weekend.

=== Washington, D.C. ===
In the 1980s, both PAT and WMATA, also known as Metro, discovered frame cracking issues with their Neoplan USA buses. However, they both later operated additional Neoplan buses, with WMATA ordering the AN460, a 60-foot articulated version.

=== San Francisco ===
AN440 and AN460 models were ordered by the San Francisco Municipal Railway (Muni) to replace their aging bus fleet and delivered starting in 2001, but they proved troublesome. Among the problems were insufficient, excessively noisy cooling fans (sounds reached up to 90 dB), faulty transmissions, maintenance intensive brake systems (requiring service every 5,000 miles (8,000 km)), and cracking frames. The problems were compounded when Neoplan eventually refused to fix the problems, instead choosing to repossess the remaining spare parts and abruptly abandon its San Francisco overhaul yard in September 2005.

The Muni Neoplan USA buses are unique in that they have rear windows, with the air conditioning unit mounted on the roof.

=== St. Louis ===
Bi-State Development Agency, dba Metro, has a small fleet of Neoplan Buses for its MetroBus service, and since March 30, 2009, has retired them.

== See also ==
- List of buses
