= New Flyer Low Floor =

Canadian low-floor transit buses

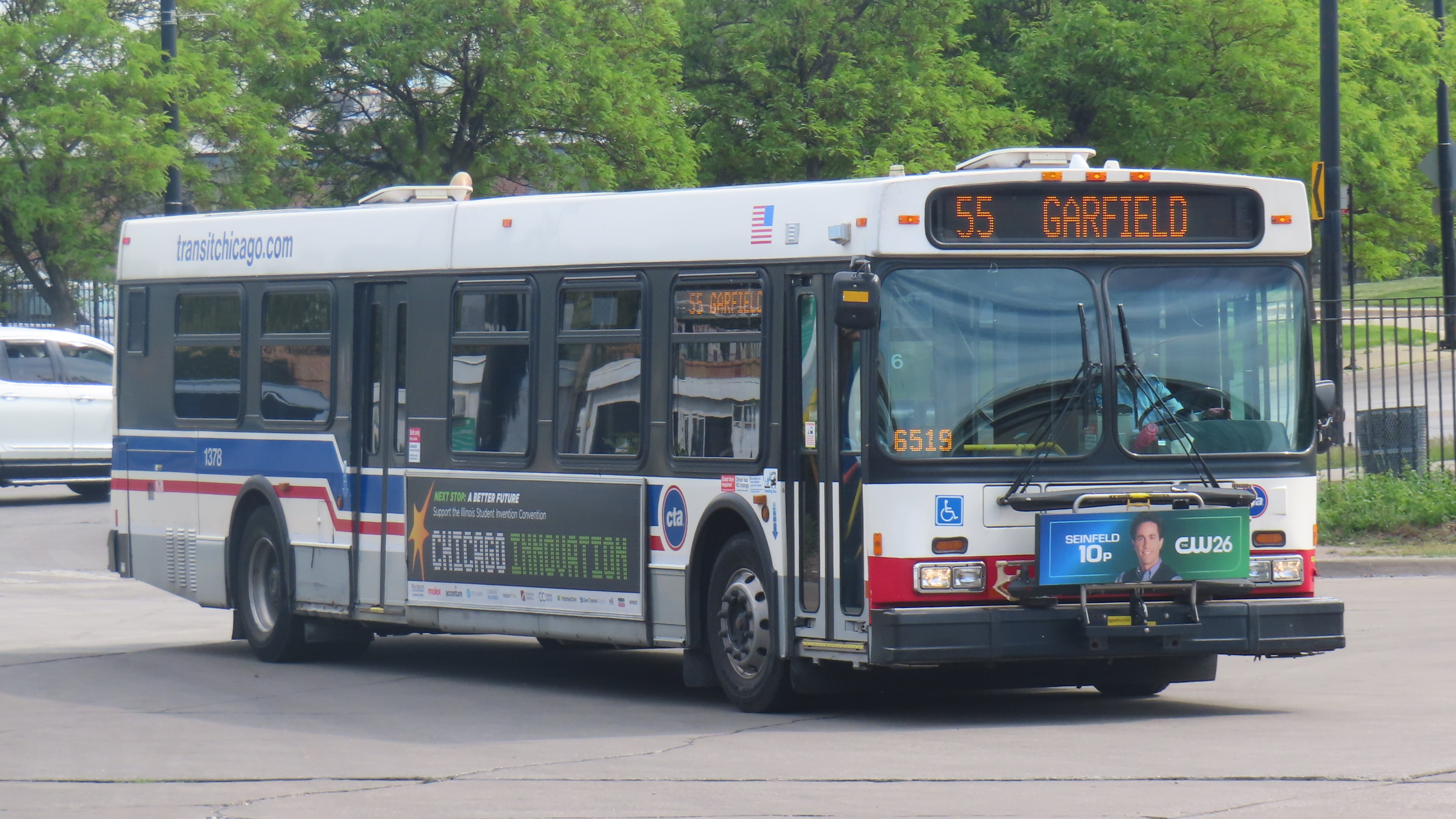
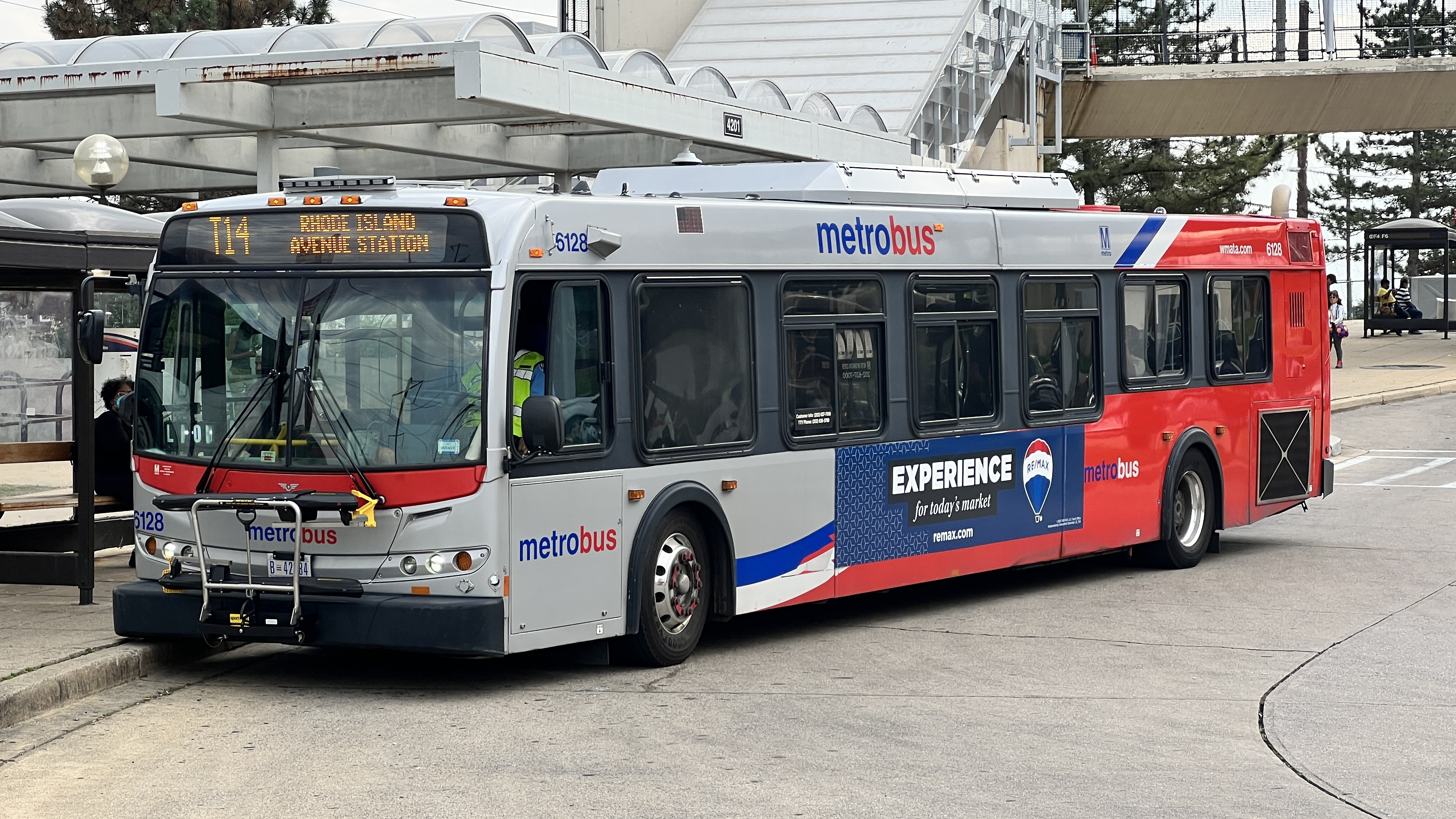
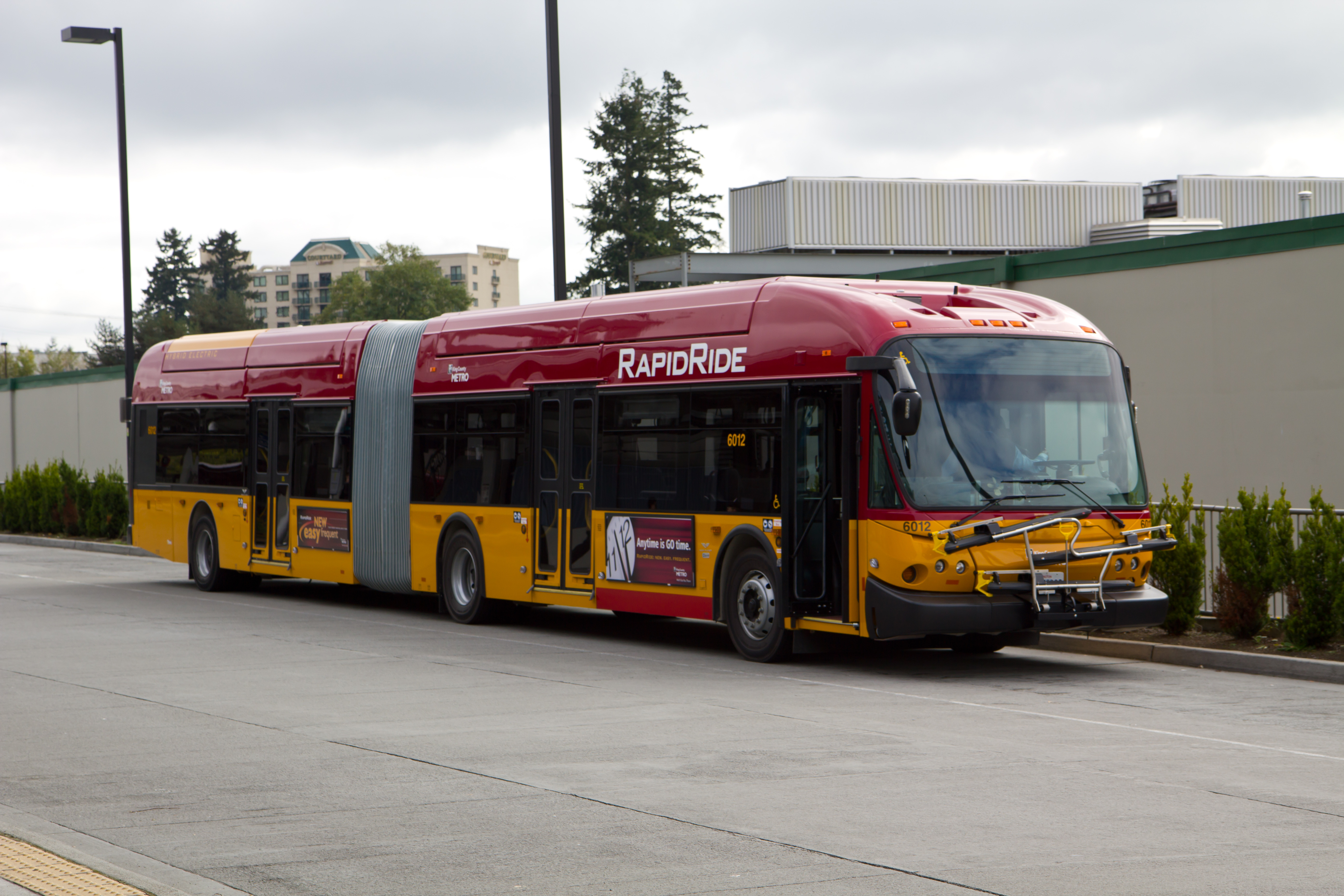
- Top: D40LF (2006); Middle: D40LFR (2006); Bottom: DE60LFA (articulated, 2010)

Overview
- Manufacturer: New Flyer
- Production: 1991–2013 (1988 pre-production) (LF); 2006–2014 (2005 pre-production) (LFR); 2005–2010 (LFA)
- Assembly: Canada: Winnipeg, Manitoba; United States: Grand Forks, North Dakota (1991–1996); Crookston, Minnesota (1996–2014); St. Cloud, Minnesota (1999–2014)

Body and chassis
- Class: Transit bus
- Body style: Monocoque stressed skin

Powertrain
- Engine: Cummins ISL (diesel, DE40LF); Detroit Diesel S40 (diesel); Detroit Diesel S50 EGR (diesel); Cummins C8.3+ NG (CNG); Detroit Diesel S50G (CNG); Caterpillar C9 (DE60LF); Ford Triton V10 (GE40LF)(HE40LF)
- Transmission: Allison B300R (30 ft (9 m)); Allison B400R (35 and 40 ft (11 and 12 m)); Allison B500R (60 ft (18 m)); Allison H 40/50 EP (HExx); ISE-Siemens ThunderVolt (GExx); Voith; ZF

Dimensions
- Wheelbase: 169.08 in (4.29 m) (30-foot); 228.25 in (5.80 m) (35-foot); 293 in (7.44 m) (40-foot); F:228.22 in (5.80 m) / R:302.77 in (7.69 m) (60-foot artic.)
- Length: over bumpers: 30.5 ft (9.3 m) (30-foot); 35.5 ft (10.8 m) (35-foot); 40.85 ft (12.5 m) (40-foot); 60.7 ft (18.5 m) (60-foot artic.)
- Width: 102 in (2.59 m)
- Height: 121 in (3.07 m) (diesel, over A/C) to 132 in (3.35 m) (CNG)
- Curb weight: 24,500 to 26,000 lb (11,100 to 11,800 kg) (30-foot); 26,200 to 28,700 lb (11,900 to 13,000 kg) (35-foot); 27,200 to 29,700 lb (12,300 to 13,500 kg) (40-foot); 41,500 to 43,700 lb (18,800 to 19,800 kg) (60-foot artic.)

Chronology
- Predecessor: New Flyer High Floor
- Successor: New Flyer Invero; New Flyer Xcelsior

The New Flyer Low Floor series is a line of low-floor transit buses that was manufactured by New Flyer Industries for the North American market from 1991 to 2014. It was produced in a variety of variants, available in four nominal lengths (ranging from 30 to 60 feet) and three body styles, and with a variety of powertrains, including diesel and compressed natural gas engines, and hybrid electric systems.

== Variants ==
The Low Floor series includes 38 individual variants, each named according to their powertrain, length, and body style. For example, the D40LF (the most common variant) is a diesel-powered, 40-foot rigid bus with the original styling; while a DE60LFR is a diesel-electric hybrid, 60-foot articulated bus with the "Restyled" body.

Model Codes
Motive power	Nominal length	Body style
C = compressed natural gas D = conventional diesel DE = diesel-electric hybrid E = electric trolleybus F or H = hydrogen fuel cell GE = gasoline-electric hybrid HE = hydrogen-electric hybrid L = liquefied natural gas	30 = 30 feet (9.1 m) rigid 35 = 35 feet (11 m) rigid 40 = 40 feet (12 m) rigid 60 = 60 feet (18 m) articulated	LF = original Low Floor; LFR = Low Floor Restyled; LFA (initially LF-BRT) = Low Floor Advanced

Not all possible combinations of models, lengths, and powertrains were actually built; those which saw production are noted below:

New Flyer Low Floor combinations produced
Power	Low Floor (LF)				Low Floor Restyled (LFR)				Low Floor Advanced (LFA)		
Power	30LF	35LF	40LF	60LF	30LFR	35LFR	40LFR	60LFR	35LFA	40LFA	60LFA
C	⏺	⏺	⏺			⏺	⏺				
D	⏺	⏺	⏺	⏺		⏺	⏺	⏺		⏺	⏺
DE		⏺	⏺	⏺	⏺	⏺	⏺	⏺	⏺	⏺	⏺
E			⏺				⏺	⏺			
F/H			⏺				⏺				
GE			⏺			⏺	⏺			⏺	
HE			⏺								
L	⏺	⏺	⏺				⏺				

== History ==
The original design of the New Flyer Low Floor was based on the B85/B86, a European-market bus produced from 1984 to 1988 by Den Oudsten, a Dutch bus manufacturer which owned New Flyer from 1986 to 2002. A B85 was sent to the United States for testing in 1988, and served as the basis for the development of the Low Floor series.

Production of the Low Floor Series began in 1991 at New Flyer's assembly plant in Grand Forks, North Dakota. The first unit, of the D40LF variant, was delivered to the Port Authority of New York and New Jersey in 1992. The first articulated Low Floor (a D60LF), an ex-demonstration unit, was sold to Strathcona County Transit in Alberta in 1996.

New Flyer introduced the Invero series of buses in 1999 with the intent that it would replace the Low Floor line; few were sold, and the Invero was discontinued in 2007.

Two new body styles were introduced in 2005: the Low Floor Restyled (LFR), meant to replace the original Low Floor, and the Low Floor Advanced (LFA), an alternate style specialized for bus rapid transit. Both were produced alongside the original Low Floor style. All three were ultimately replaced by the Xcelsior series, introduced in 2008. The LFA variants were discontinued in 2010, followed by the standard Low Floor style in 2013, and the LFR in 2014.

=== Market achievements ===
The New Flyer Low Floor series, specifically the D40LF, was the first low-floor bus sold in the U.S. and Canadian markets. According to New Flyer, later variants of the Low Floor series also represented the first North American buses of certain configurations:

- first low-floor articulated bus (D60LF, 1995)
- first bus powered by compressed natural gas (C40LF/L40LF, 1994)
- first gasoline-electric hybrid buses (GE40LF, 2002)
- first hybrid articulated bus (DE60LF, 2002)
- first hydrogen-electric hybrid bus (HE40LF, 2004)

== Powertrain specifications ==
=== Hybrid powertrains ===
The series hybrid powertrain is supplied by ISE Corporation, branded ThunderVolt. The ISE ThunderVolt system is modular, with several primary subsystems including a diesel, gasoline, or hydrogen-fueled auxiliary power unit (APU), traction motors and gearbox (supplied by Siemens under the ELFA brand), and energy storage (using either batteries or ultracapacitors).

==== Gasoline ====
Emissions regulations developed by the South Coast Air Quality Management District prevented local transit agencies in southern California from purchasing new diesel-powered transit buses after 2002. Although most agencies responded by pursuing natural gas-powered buses, Long Beach Transit (LBT) conducted a cost analysis that concluded a gasoline-electric hybrid could meet emissions requirements and also be cost-effective. LBT went on to purchase 47 model year 2004 and 2005 GE40LF buses, the first major purchase of the GE40LF.

Omnitrans, serving the city of San Bernardino, was the lead agency for the ISE ThunderVolt gasoline-electric hybrid powertrain deployed in the GE40LF. Omnitrans procured two of the three testing prototypes; Long Beach Transit placed the first large-volume regular production order.

For the GE40LF delivered to LBT, the gasoline-electric hybrid APU uses a light-duty 6.8 L Ford Triton V-10 engine rated at 305 hp (227 kW) at 4,250 RPM and 405 lb⋅ft (549 N⋅m) at 3,250 RPM coupled to a 110 kW (150 hp) generator (145 kW (194 hp) peak). The electricity generated by the APU is stored in two banks of 144 ultracapacitors each. Stored power is sent to two three-phase asynchronous traction motors, each rated at 85 kW (114 hp) (150 kW (200 hp) peak) and 320 N⋅m (240 lb⋅ft) (450 N⋅m (330 lb⋅ft) peak), which drive the rear axle through a combining gearbox with a peak output torque of 4,860 N⋅m (3,580 lb⋅ft). The Siemens ELFA traction motors and combining gearbox are the same in all ThunderVolt implementations.

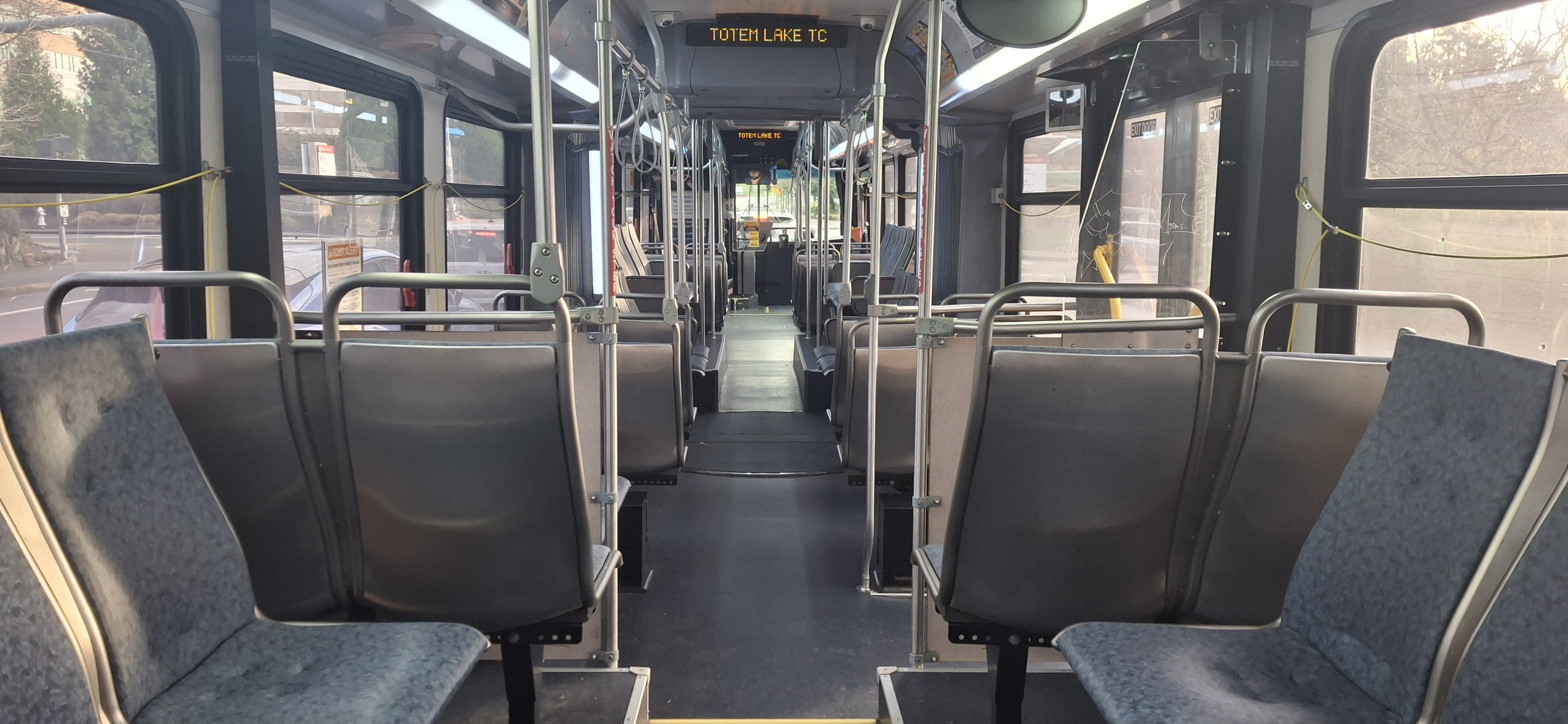
Interior of a DE60LFR operated by King County Metro

==== Hydrogen-electric hybrid ====
ISE also built the ThunderVolt TB40-HICE, a prototype 40-foot hydrogen-electric hybrid Low Floor. This prototype, designated HE40LF, was equipped with the ISE ThunderVolt series hybrid powertrain, using a Ford 6.8L V10 internal combustion engine modified to run on hydrogen, which was in turn coupled to a generator to provide energy for the traction motor and storage battery. It was tested by SunLine Transit Agency (who assigned it fleet number 550) and Winnipeg Transit in early 2005 in revenue service. The derelict HE40LF was displayed by Ken Porter Auctions in early 2020 and presumably sold for scrap.

=== Trolleybus ===
One prototype Low Floor trolleybus was introduced in 2005, sold to Coast Mountain Bus Company as an E40LF model; since New Flyer were introducing their Low Floor Restyled series that year, production of Low Floor trolleybuses has been designated as E40LFR and E60LFR.

Coast Mountain Bus Company designated their E40LF as TransLink 2101, which was unveiled at Stanley Park in 2005. Although it is designated an E40LF, 2101 bears the updated front and rear fascias of the LFR "Restyled" models.

=== Fuel cell ===
Twenty-one examples of the fuel cell "restyled" variant designated H40LFR were operated by SunLine Transit Agency and BC Transit. Twenty H40LFR buses were built for BC Transit in 2010 at an estimated total cost of CA$89.5 million, including operating costs through 2014. They were meant to showcase fuel cell vehicles during the 2010 Winter Olympics. After 2014, BC Transit announced plans to sell off their H40LFR buses, stating that operating costs were double those of conventional diesel-powered buses.

== See also ==
Competing models:

- Gillig Low Floor
- NABI LFW
- NABI BRT
- Neoplan AN440LF and AN460LF
- Nova Bus LFS
- OBI Orion VI
- OBI Orion VII
