= Neoplan USA =

American transit bus manufacturing company

Coordinates: 38.09554°N 102.61051°W

- Industry: Transit
- Founded: 1981 (Lamar, Colorado as a subsidiary of Neoplan)
- Defunct: 2006
- Fate: Bankruptcy/liquidation
- Headquarters: Denver, Colorado, U.S.
- Products: Buses
- Number of employees: 625

Neoplan USA was a major transit bus manufacturing company based in Denver, Colorado. It started as a subsidiary of the German corporation Neoplan in 1981 with its main factory and headquarters in Lamar, Colorado. In 1998, Neoplan USA was acquired by Willis Stein & Partners and became an independent licensee of designs from the German company Neoplan. The company declared bankruptcy in 2006.

The headquarters were moved to Denver in 2004. Neoplan USA also had production facilities in Honey Brook, Pennsylvania (1986), and Brownsville, Texas (2001–02); the Honey Brook site was retained as a parts distribution center.

== History ==
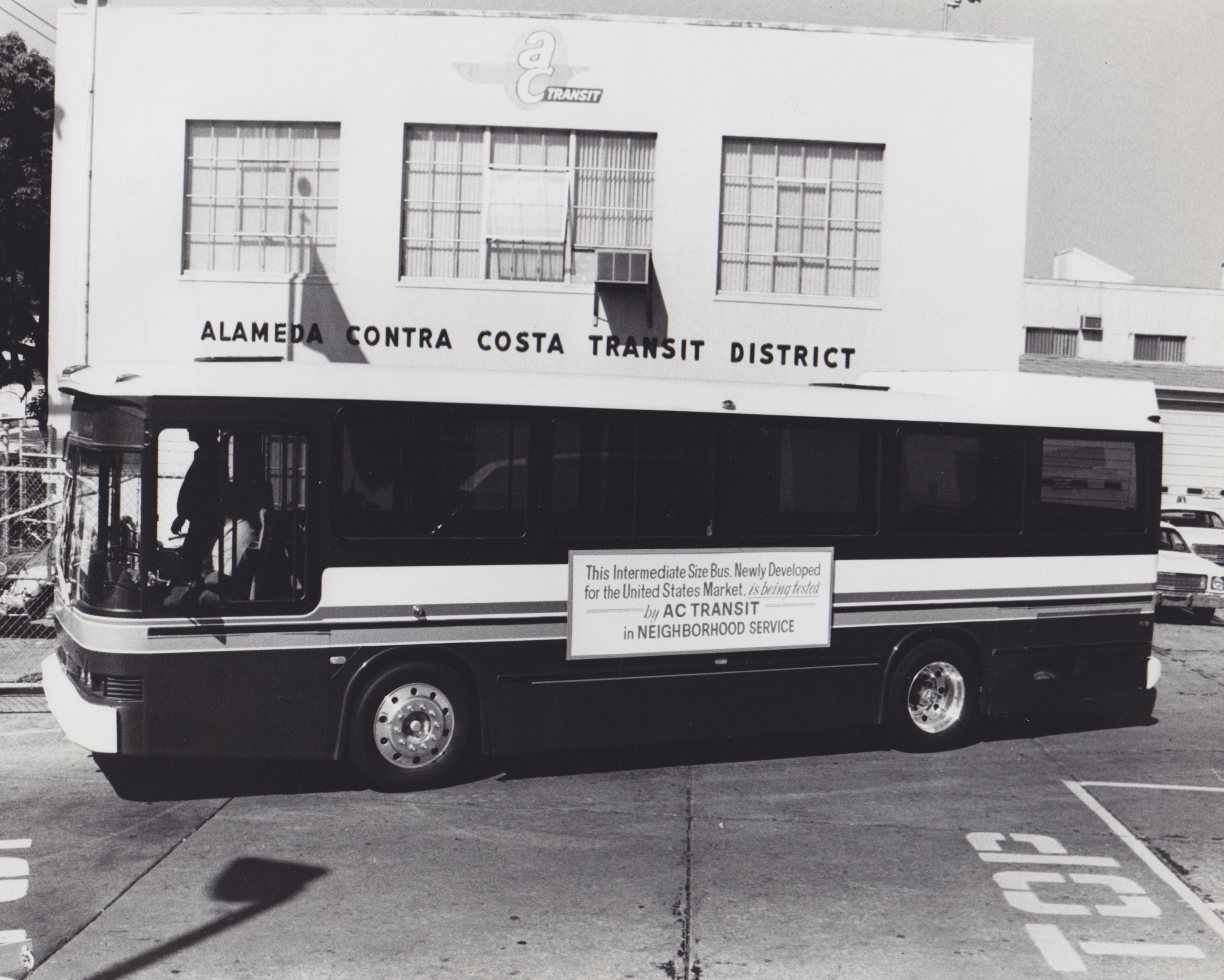
"Intermediate Size Bus" assembled by Gillig under a license from Neoplan, during testing with AC Transit

Prior to opening its own factory, Neoplan broke into the United States transit market by licensing a 30-foot (9 m) long bus design to Gillig, who assembled and sold it as the Gillig-Neoplan from 1976 to 1978. At the time Neoplan was better known for its intercity coaches rather than its transit buses. The company participated in the development of the VöV-Standard-Bus in the late 1970s and built transit buses for Saudi Arabia in 1979 and 1980. In February 1980, company officials announced they would open a plant in either Lamar or Clearfield, Pennsylvania, ultimately selecting Lamar for its mild winters and sunny weather. After announcing its intentions to build its factory, Neoplan USA began soliciting bids for transit buses.

=== Origin and expansion ===
Neoplan USA opened its first American manufacturing facility in May 1981. It was Neoplan's fifth factory worldwide, a 139,000-square-foot (12,900 m^{2}) plant on an 18-acre (7.3 ha) site; construction took just four months. The city of Lamar, a farming town of 8,000 that faced tough economic times, pushed to have the plant built in the town in the hope of diversifying their economic base. It donated land and roads for the manufacturing site. The street that went to the plant was renamed Gottlob Auwärter Drive for the founder of Neoplan. Company officials reportedly sought a rural site "because of their conviction, based on experience in Europe, that rural workers have a better work ethic and are more reliable and productive employees". An additional incentive was the hot water supplied from the city's neighboring power plant to heat the factory. Neoplan started a program at the local community college to train workers, and trainee foremen were sent to West Germany for eight weeks; at the end of the overseas program, the foremen had to build a bus that would take them to the airport.

Neoplan USA manufactured standard-floor buses, low-floor buses, and articulated buses, with each bus taking 14 days to build. After each bus was completed, the workers were given a ride to their homes in the bus to critique their work. When Neoplan USA opened in 1981, company officials said the plant would employ up to 500 people, and manufacture as many as 500 vehicles a year on two assembly lines. Their first contracts included 50 transit buses for Metropolitan Atlanta Rapid Transit Authority (MARTA) and 40 for the Milwaukee County Transit System (MCTS). Contracts for another 500 were being bid on. The buses built for Atlanta and Milwaukee were conventional "New Look"-type buses designated "Atlantis" or N-416, and were the only "New Look" buses assembled by Neoplan USA, which also was offering the "Transliner" or N412, an "Advanced Design" bus to compete with the GM Rapid Transit Series and Flxible Metro.

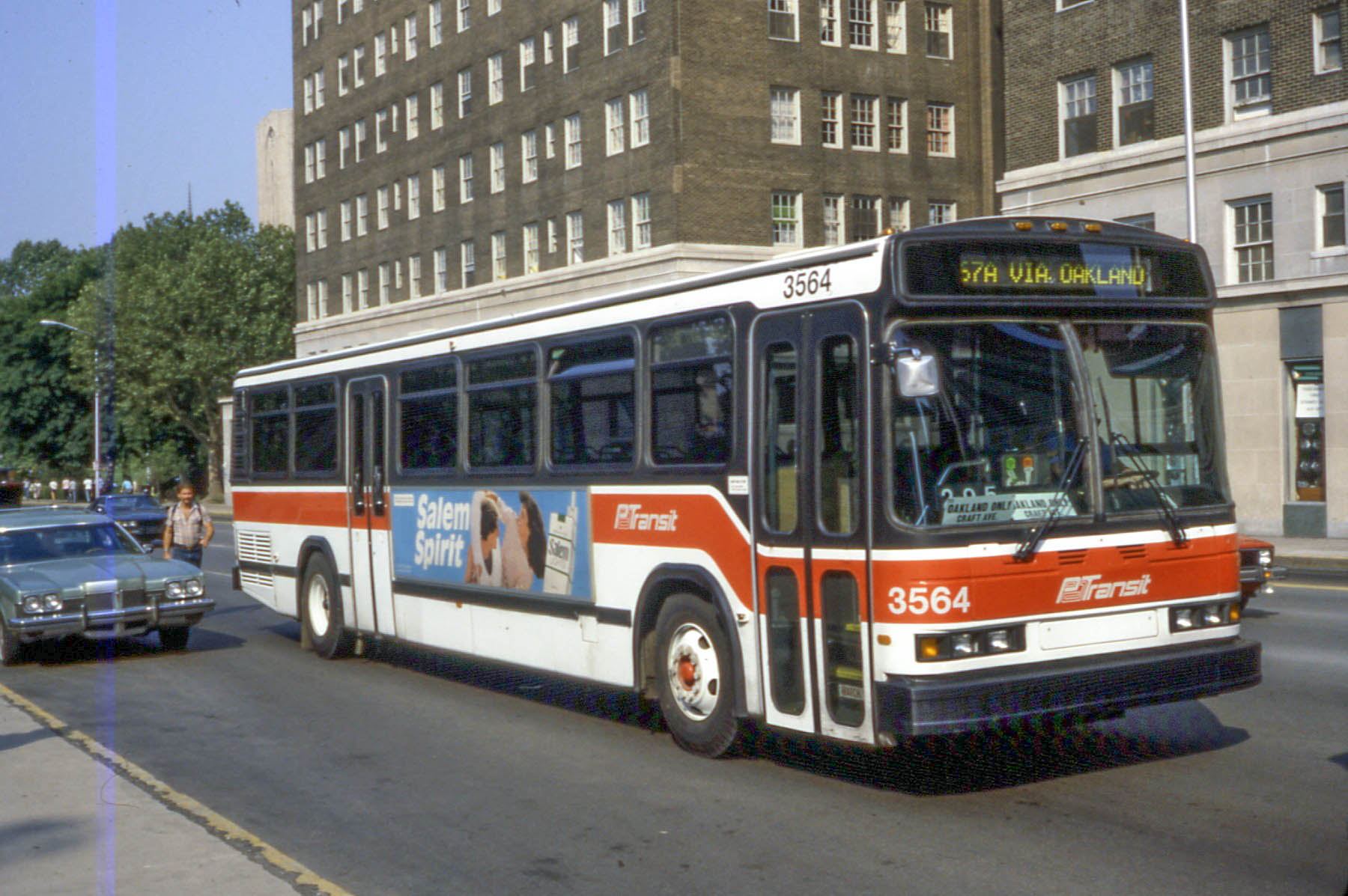
PA Transit #3564, part of the 1982 order from PennDOT

Later in 1981, its first year of operation, Neoplan USA sold 46 articulated buses to MARTA. This was also a year when articulated buses, 60-foot-long (18 m) buses that bent in the middle, were gaining interest with transit departments. As the federal government was phasing out subsidies for mass transit, these buses got attention because they were cost effective. They carried more passengers and saved on labor costs, as they required only one driver. Another significant early contract was awarded for 1,000 "Transliner" buses as a pooled purchase coordinated by PennDOT in 1982 for 16 transit agencies in the state of Pennsylvania, primarily to PA Transit (410) and SEPTA (450), which led to Neoplan exploring locations for a second factory in that state. It was the largest single bus contract in the U.S. to date. The first buses, nicknamed "Pennliners", were delivered to Pennsylvania in October 1982, and were assembled in Colorado.

Neoplan USA's share of the United States bus market was 1.3 percent in 1981, grew to 10.4 percent in 1982, and went to 25.2 percent in 1983 based on production orders. By December 1982, Neoplan USA had completed more than 250 buses. After announcing plans to open a second plant in Pennsylvania in 1982, Neoplan USA showed a model of the bus assembly factory it planned to build in 1984, located in Honey Brook, a 70,000-square-foot (6,500 m^{2}) facility sited on 25 acres (10 ha). By 1986, Neoplan USA had claimed 40% of the United States transit bus market. However, structural cracking issues would lead to a voluntary recall of buses in 1985.

=== Defects and reputation ===
Neoplan USA buses had a history of manufacturing defects. One Milwaukee transit official called Neoplan USA "totally disorganized" and lacking quality control. Early production Transliner buses were prone to cracking at the rear A-frame, first discovered in buses sold to transit agencies in Washington DC and Los Angeles. In addition, a defective defroster unit led to an electrical fire and passenger evacuation. The National Highway and Traffic Safety Administration (NHTSA) wrote to Neoplan USA President Bob Lee on December 27, 1984, urging a voluntary recall for the cracking and electrical issues "in the interest of safety", or it would face a formal investigation and possible mandatory recall. Neoplan USA stated it "has never, nor does it now, consider these cracks safety-related" in its written response. In March 1985, Neoplan USA followed the recommendations of the NHTSA and recalled all 2,000 buses then in service nationwide. Neoplan USA continued to deny the cracks were safety issues.

==== Washington, D.C. ====
In June 1983 76 Transliner buses from Neoplan USA were purchased by the Washington Metropolitan Area Transit Authority (WMATA) of Washington, D.C., for $12.5 million. Fairfax County Supervisor Joseph Alexander, a member of the WMATA Board and then-president of the American Public Transportation Association, criticized the decision to proceed with Neoplan USA bus purchases, stating Neoplan USA buses were frequently defective and that other transit systems had filed complaints. Neoplan USA won the bid for Metro because they had underbid General Motors, a competing bus manufacturer, by $275,000. Metro officials were also given tours by Neoplan USA of their manufacturing facilities and were convinced to buy the buses afterwards.

In March 1984 Metro found hairline cracks in 32 Neoplan USA buses. The cracks were in the undercarriage of the buses, "...in a weld joining a steel frame above the rear axle with a component that helps support the bus suspension system." At the time, the cracks were not judged to pose a significant safety hazard.

On December 23, 1984, a Neoplan USA bus in operation was destroyed in a fire, caused by a faulty electrical circuit. A NHTSA investigation found the fire was due to excessive amperage in a protective circuit breaker and an absence of a cutoff switch.

In February 1985 cracks were found in all of the remaining 75 Neoplan USA buses in service in D.C. These cracks were near the front axles and could have led to loss of steering control. Other cracks were found in steel plates, tubes and welds. This led to Metro halting the service of all Neoplan buses, which mainly served the southeastern Washington, D.C., area.

Neoplan USA president Robert Lee pledged to repair the buses at the company's expense, saying it was a minor repair that did not create safety problems. In May 1985 an agreement was reached for Neoplan USA to pay for repairs to Metro buses, costing about $1 million. Neoplan USA was criticized for failing to meet deadlines agreed to with the authority. In a letter dated May 3, 1985, Neoplan USA stated there "is no safety-related basis for the vehicles currently being held out of service", adding the actions by Metro were "unreasonable and unjustified."

==== Los Angeles ====
Since the early 1980s Neoplan USA assembled buses for Southern California Rapid Transit District (SCRTD), which later became the Los Angeles County Metropolitan Transportation Authority (LACMTA). In September 1984, like the buses sold to WMATA, cracks were found in 128 SCRTD Neoplan USA buses, and more cracks were found in 92 buses through February 1985.

In the 1990s, Neoplan USA had a high rate of problems occurring in many of its methanol and ethanol fueled buses. On January 4, 2000, a report by LACMTA Inspector General Arthur Sinai cited multiple issues with 250 new Neoplan USA buses delivered between 1997 and 1999. They included a dozen chronic defects on clutches, problems with exhaust pipes and engine oil reservoirs, failing door structures and defective wheelchair lifts. The report also noted that "none of these problems were remedied by the manufacturer."

The report also noted problems went unfixed for long periods, and if repaired, were often performed at LACMTA expense instead of under warranty. Some warranty claims were refused by Neoplan USA due to lateness in processing complaints.

The report also noted conflicts of interest with MTA inspectors. Three inspectors took jobs with Neoplan USA after leaving the LACMTA, with one of them working with Neoplan USA one month after their resignation. Many inspectors who traveled to the Lamar plant were caught falsifying travel and expense accounts for nearly $10,000 over a 7-month period ending in 1997. One LACMTA engineer accused of account padding was charged with grand theft in Los Angeles in 1999.

==== Pittsburgh ====
Buses delivered under the 1982 PennDOT contract were subject to premature corrosion and required costly repairs, prompting a state investigation. Port Authority of Allegheny County (PA Transit), serving Pittsburgh, Pennsylvania, negotiated a settlement for $1.7 million in 1990 relating to the premature corrosion issues.

PA Transit later bought 159 low floor buses from Neoplan USA that entered service in 1999, at a total cost of $47.7 million, or up to $300,000 apiece. The Pittsburgh buses were the first serially produced new AN440LF low-floor transit bus. Cracks in the frame were found shortly after the buses were delivered in August 1999, and the buses were pulled out of service by September 2000. Neoplan USA agreed to pay for repairs for buses under warranty, and compensated the Port Authority for additional costs associated with the defects on the buses.

It was reported that these same bus models had undergone testing by the Federal Transit Administration in 1994 and 1995, and problems were detected in these tests. One bus broke down shortly after testing started in May 1994, after being driven 94 miles (151 km), and structural cracks were found after 482 miles (776 km). By the time testing concluded in May 1995 with 15,000 miles (24,000 km) accumulated, numerous cracks had been found in 10 different places in the steel frame, air cooler outlet and axle mounts. The repairs involved significant rework, adding plates and gussets to reinforce the existing structure.

PA Transit retired its last Neoplan USA buses in December 2019.

==== San Francisco ====
The San Francisco Municipal Railway (Muni) began taking delivery of 230 Neoplan USA buses in April 2000, equipped with cleaner-burning diesel engines. Residents complained about the noise from engine cooling system and called the new buses "screaming banshees", with tests showing noise levels of 88 to 90 dB, exceeding the 83 dB contract requirement. The engine cooling fan was modified and sound-deadening material was added to reduce noise. The original fans also proved to provide inadequate engine cooling, requiring the installation of electric fans, consuming 32 labor hours per bus. By the end of 2001, the Neoplan USA buses for Muni were breaking down, with one driver declaring that "every one of those buses is a piece of garbage" and up to two per day required towing back to the bus yards.

Articulated buses from Neoplan USA acquired by Muni in 2001 also exhibited issues, with the brake slack adjusters requiring replacement after 5,000 miles (8,000 km) of service, just 1/10th of the typical maintenance interval.

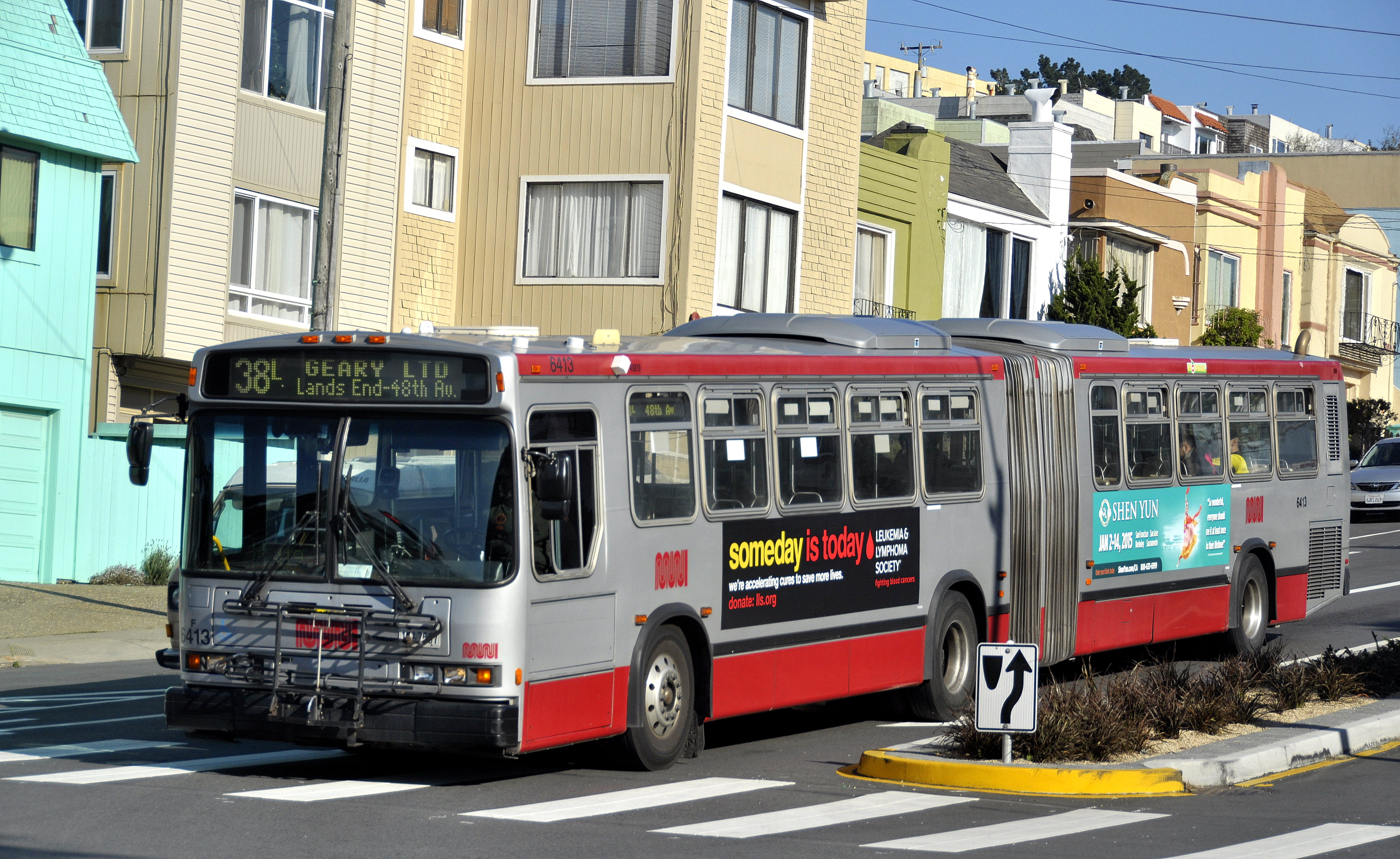
A Muni articulated AN460 in 2015

Muni withheld the final payment to Neoplan USA for the 330 buses over a missed deadline to correct issues. After the June 30, 2005, deadline passed, Neoplan USA stated it could not continue its operations without payment and abandoned its bus overhaul yard in San Francisco in late September, leaving behind 98 unrepaired buses but taking all of its spare parts away.

==== Boston ====
The Massachusetts Bay Transportation Authority (MBTA) idled its entire fleet of newly delivered Transliner AN440LF low-floor transit buses in July 2005 after discovering damage on 21 buses that had traversed the same massive pothole. The pothole damaged the torque rods connecting the steering and suspension linkages, leading to two steering-related crashes. Additional cracks in suspension components were discovered in 2006 and 2007.

=== Acquisition and bankruptcy ===
Neoplan USA was acquired by Willis Stein & Partners, a Chicago-based private investment firm in 1998, making it independent of its German parent Neoplan, although one source states it was spun off in 1989.

The company opened a third US plant, occupying the space previously used by Eagle Bus at Brownsville, Texas, in June 2001, but that plant closed shortly afterward in June 2002 as part of a restructuring that began under new President John Russell, who came on board in April 2002. Neoplan USA also discontinued its entire luxury motorcoach line (Cityliner, Skyliner, Starliner, and Spaceliner) in 2002, concentrating on its transit buses. In August 2003, the company sold a small equity share to its lenders to reduce its outstanding loans by 75 percent, and announced its corporate headquarters would move from Lamar to Denver one year later, saving customers and suppliers a three-hour drive. Neoplan USA moved into office spaces previously occupied by Frontier Airlines.

In 2003–2006 it also built 28 40-foot (12 m) electric trolley buses and 32 articulated dual-mode buses for Boston's MBTA. Neoplan USA was the sole bidder; because of the small size and specialized manufacturing needed for the order, MBTA was granted a waiver to Buy America requirements, as the buses would be assembled in Germany. Neoplan USA reached a peak of 625 employees and revenue of $810 million before it ceased operations in January 2006.

On November 15, 2005, Neoplan USA announced it would close its Lamar plant on January 13 after failing to raise $10 million in new capital. Neoplan USA filed for Chapter 11 bankruptcy protection in August 2006, listing assets of $13.7 million and debts of $59 million. In its last few months of operation, Neoplan USA had fallen on hard times, such as warranty issues with San Francisco's MUNI and cash-flow problems after Boston's MBTA canceled an order due to late deliveries. A manufacturing company based in Texas purchased the Neoplan factory in Lamar, promising to reopen in 2008.

The company still technically continued to exist until selling its parts-supply division, Neopart. Once Neopart was sold, in October 2007, Neoplan USA ceased to exist.

== Models ==
- Atlantis (transit buses)
  Powered by Detroit Diesel 6V71N, 8V71N, or 6V92TA
  - N-416-35/N-416-40 (35/40-foot, early model 1981–1982)
- Metroliner (over the road "suburban" coach buses)
  Powered by Detroit Diesel Series 60 diesel engine
  - AN340/3 / AN345/3 (40 / 45-foot (12 / 14 m) nominal length, 3-axle)
- Transliner (transit buses)
  Powered by Detroit Diesel Series 6V92TA/ 50 / 60, Cummins, CAT diesel or CNG engines
  - AN430/AN435/AN440 (30/35/40-foot, high-floor model)
  - AN435LF/AN440LF (35/40-foot, low-floor)
  - AN440/3 (40-foot, high floor, 3 axle suburban made only for SCRTD/LACMTA)
  - AN440TLF/AN445TLF (40/45-foot, true low-floor, aka Intraliner)
  - AN440LF-ETB (40-foot, low floor trolleybus, made only for MBTA)
- Articulated (transit buses)
  Powered by Detroit Diesel Series 6V92TA/ 50 / 60, Cummins, CAT diesel or CNG engines
  - AN460 (60-foot (18 m), high-floor)
  - AN460RC (59-foot, high-floor model, made only for NJ Transit)
  - AN460LF (60-foot, low-floor)
  - DMA-460LF (60-foot, low-floor dual-mode diesel/trolleybus only made for Silver Line (MBTA))
- Luxury coaches (licensed from Neoplan Bus Germany)
  Powered by Detroit Diesel Series 60 engine
  - Jetliner AN240/3 (40- or 45-foot)
  - Starliner AN516/3 (45-foot model)
  - Cityliner AN116/3 (40- or 45-foot)
  - Skyliner AN122/3 (40-foot, double-decker tour/coach bus)
  - Spaceliner AN117/3 (40- or 45-foot, double-decker motor home bus)

== Gallery ==
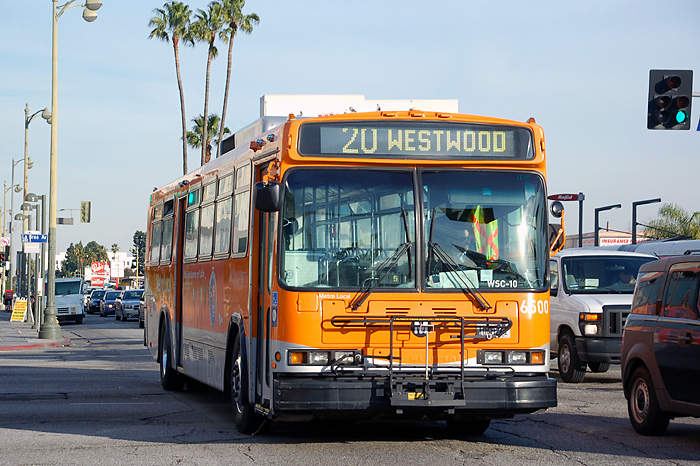
A CNG-powered AN440A standard-floor of LACMTA in Los Angeles, California

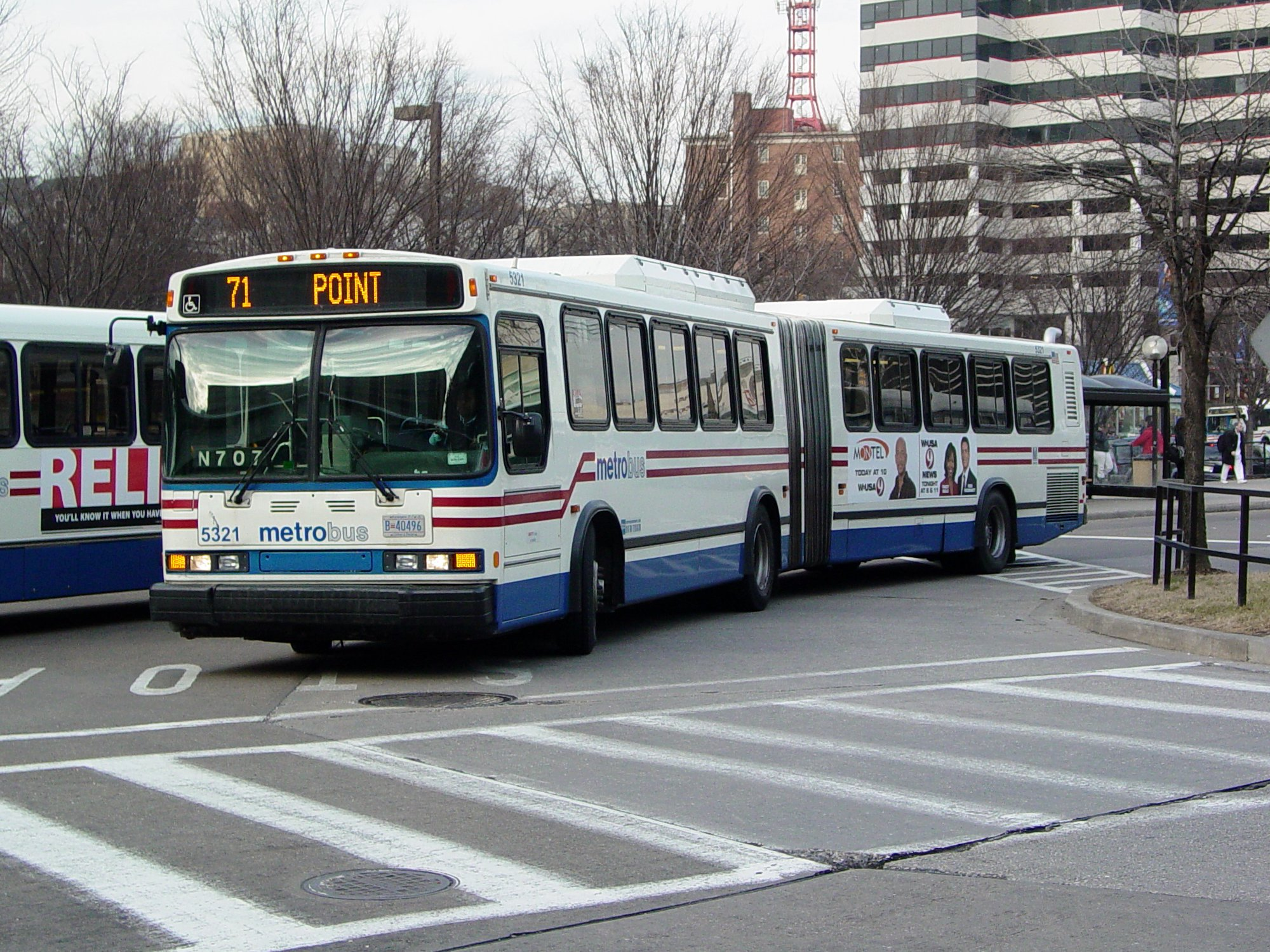
A Diesel-powered AN460 standard-floor of WMATA Metrobus in Silver Spring, Maryland

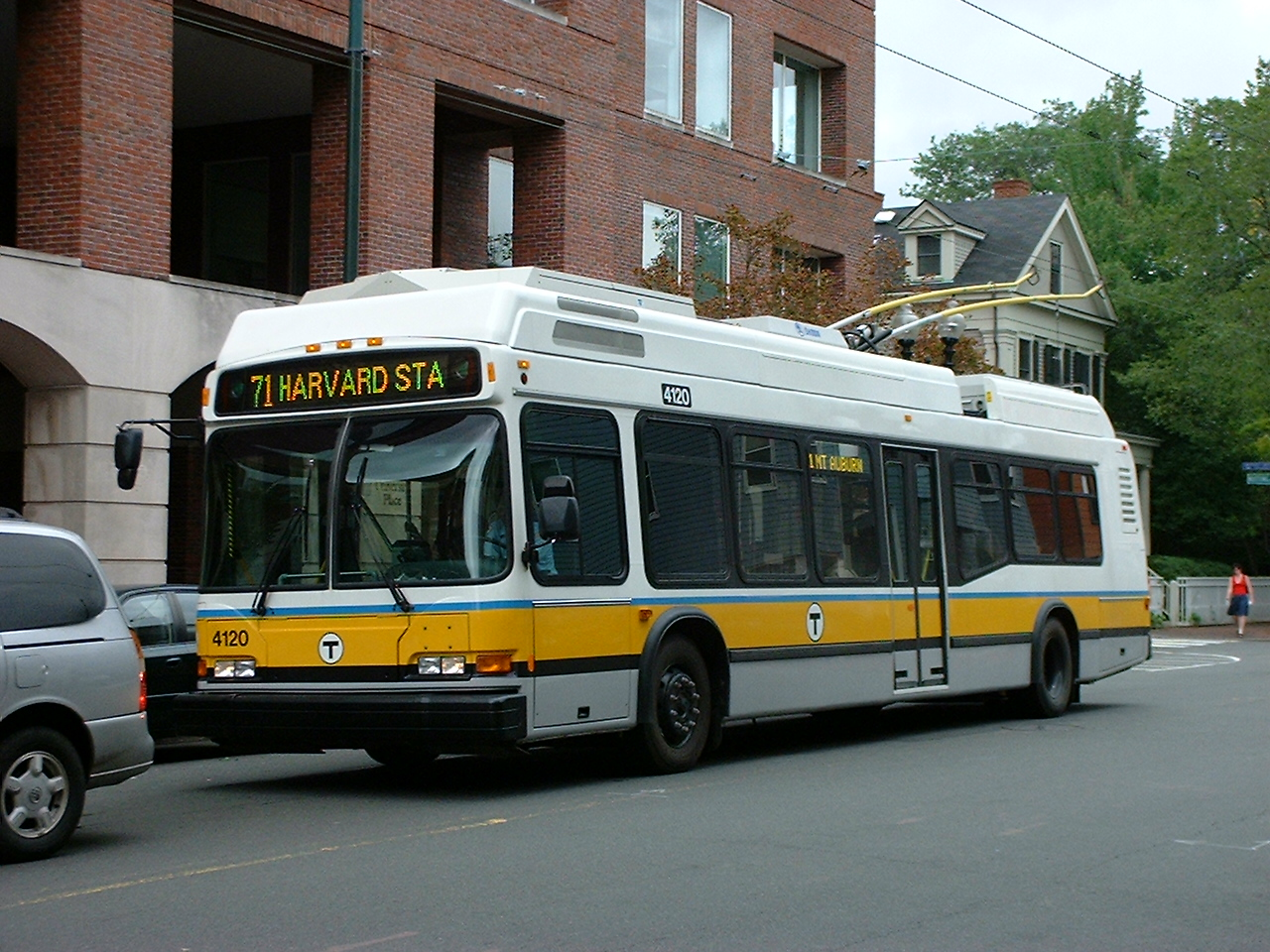
An electric trolleybus AN440LF low-floor of MBTA in Boston, Massachusetts

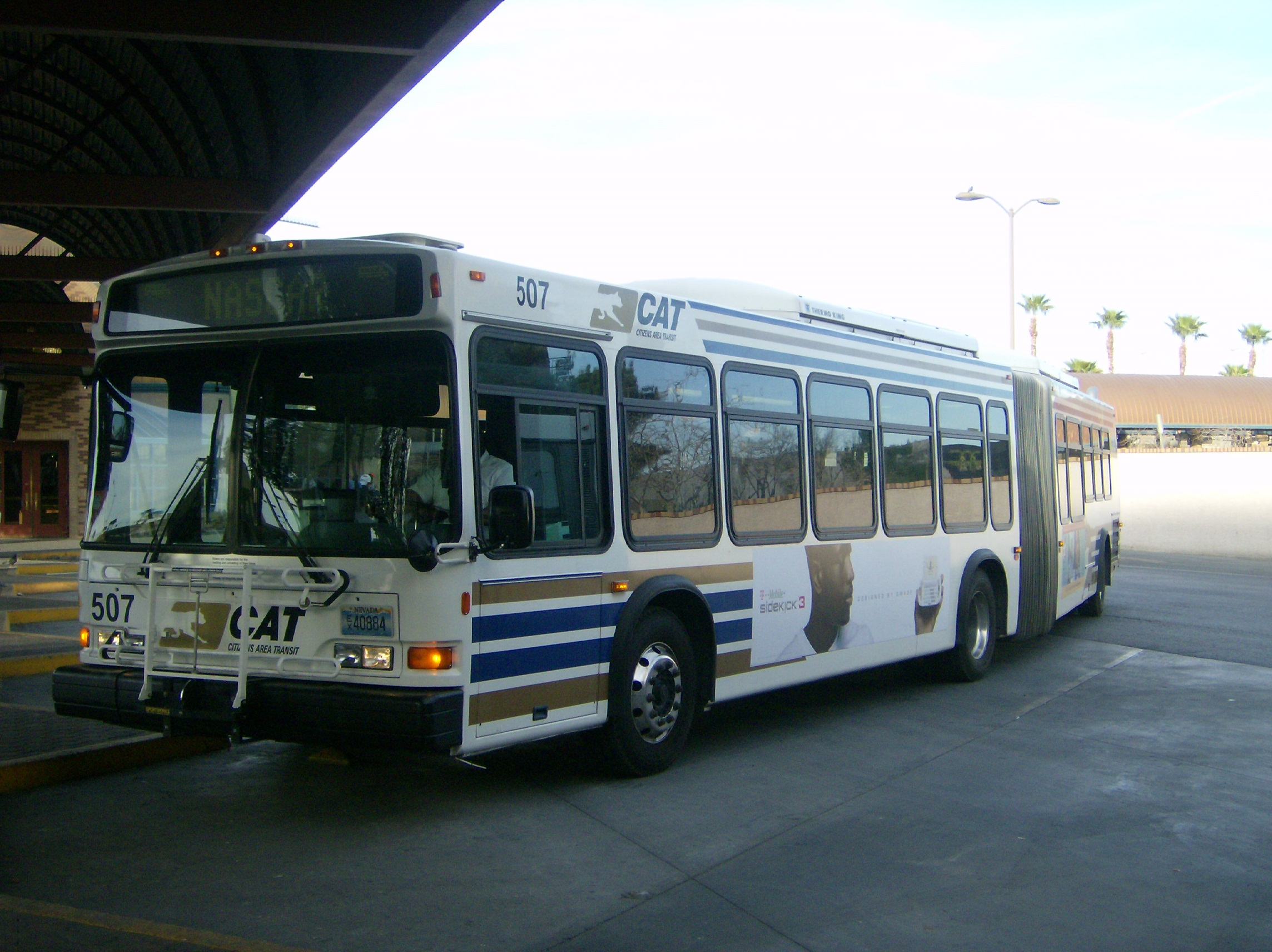
An Ultra Low-Sulfur Diesel-powered AN460LF low-floor of RTC Transit in Las Vegas, Nevada

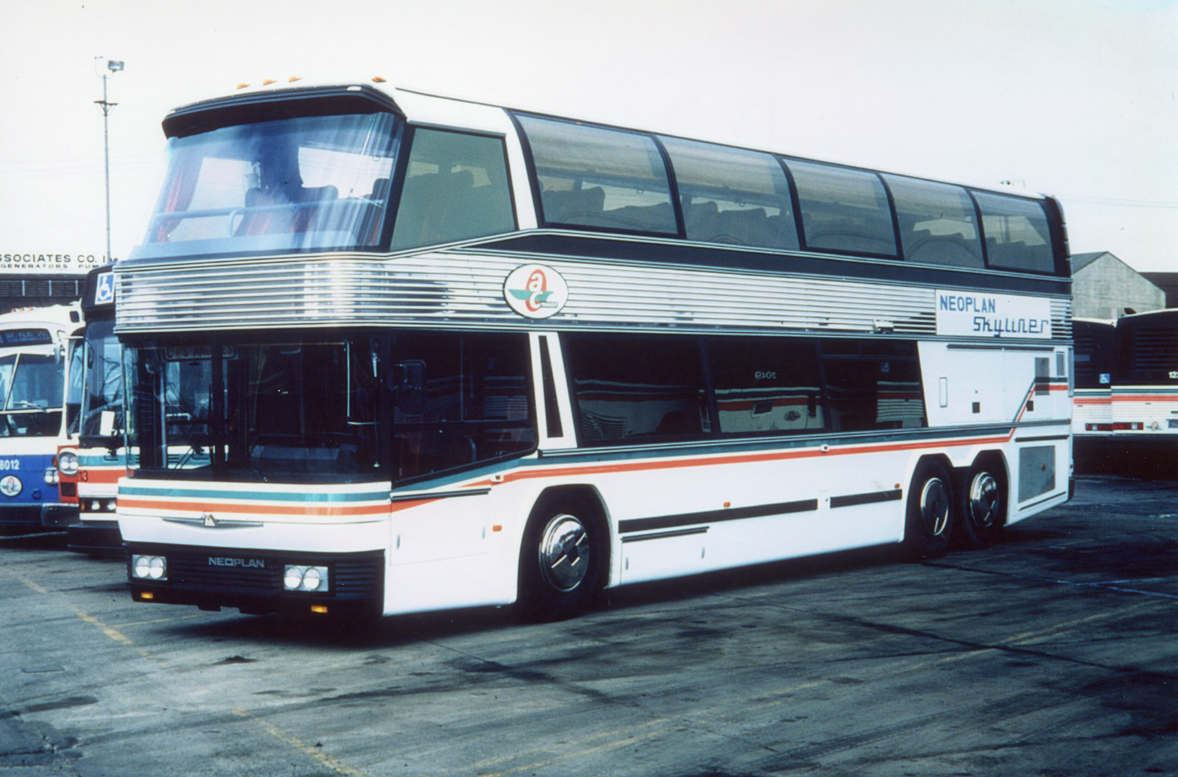
Neoplan Skyliner AN122/3 under evaluation by AC Transit, c.1983

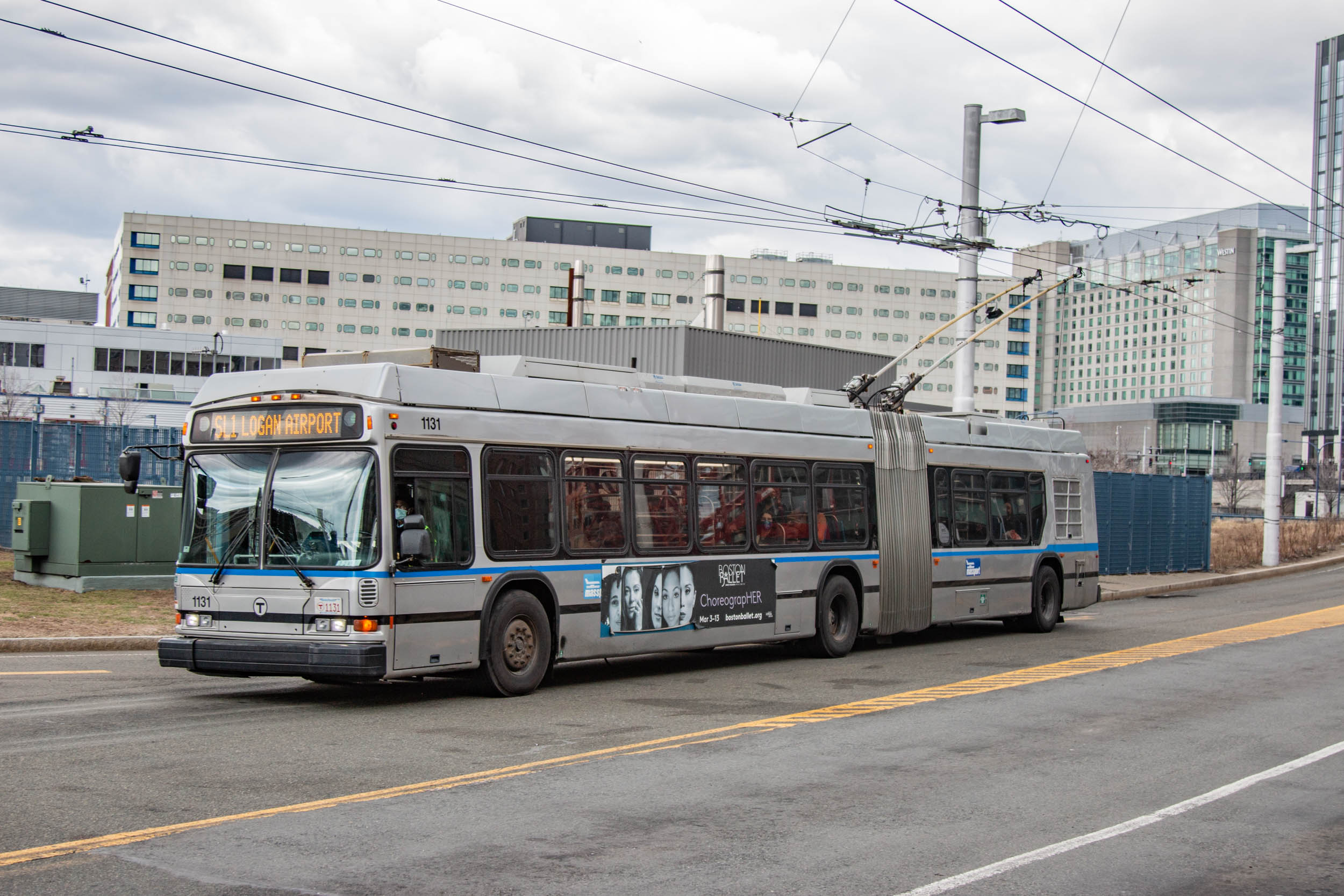
Dual mode (electric trolleybus and diesel) DMA-460LF low-floor of MBTA Silver Line in Boston, Massachusetts (2022)
