= Meritor =

American truck parts manufacturer

Meritor, Inc.
- Formerly: ArvinMeritor (2000–2011)
- Company type: Subsidiary
- Traded as: NYSE: MTOR (delisted 2022)
- Industry: Commercial vehicles systems and components
- Predecessor: Rockwell International; Arvin Industries
- Founded: 1997; 29 years ago
- Headquarters: Troy, Michigan, U.S.
- Number of locations: 39 (2016)
- Area served: Worldwide
- Key people: Jennifer Rumsey (CEO)
- Revenue: ▲US$3.34 billion (2017); US$3.20 billion (2016)
- Operating income: ▲US$207 million (2017); US$204 million (2016)
- Net income: ▼US$324 million (2017); US$573 million (2016)
- Total assets: ▲US$2.78 billion (2017); US$2.49 billion (2016)
- Total equity: ▲US$295 million (2017); US$(186) million (2016)
- Number of employees: 8,200 (2017)
- Parent: Cummins (2022–present)
- Divisions: Commercial Truck & Industrial; Aftermarket & Trailer
- Website: www.cummins.com/components/drivetrain-systems

Meritor, Inc. is an American corporation headquartered in Troy, Michigan, which manufactures automobile components for military suppliers, trucks, and trailers. Meritor is a Fortune 500 company.

In 1997, Rockwell International spun off its automotive business as Meritor. In 2000, Arvin Meritor was formed from the merger of Meritor Automotive, Inc., and Arvin Industries, Inc. On February 1, 2011, the company announced that it would revert its name to Meritor, Inc. in late March. The name change was successfully completed and launched on March 30, 2011. On February 22, 2022, Cummins announced to acquire Meritor for $3.7 billion. The acquisition closed on August 3 of that year.

== Executive management ==
Charles "Chip" McClure, former president and COO of Federal Mogul Corp., served as the CEO of Meritor from 2004 to 2013. Under his management, Meritor completed the sale of the passenger vehicle business segment in January 2011. This officially categorized this global manufacturer/supplier outside of the automotive industry. With its focus on commercial vehicle system component production, Meritor announced continuous sales loss with total revenue at $63 million in 2011 and $52 million in 2012. In August 2013, Ivor J.”Ike” Evans was named as the interim CEO of Meritor. He had been a member of Board of Directors of Meritor Inc. since 2005 and had previously served as the president and chief operating officer of Union Pacific Railroad from 1998 to 2004, and as the vice chairman of Union Pacific Cooperation from January 2004 to 2005. In July 2015, Jeffrey "Jay" Craig was named CEO of Meritor; he was succeeded by Chris Villavarayan in 2020. Jennifer Rumsey was named CEO in August 2022.

== Core business ==
The business of Meritor consists of axles, brake and safety systems, drivelines, suspensions, trailers, and aftermarket products for defense industries and commercial vehicles including truck, trailer, bus/coach, and off-highway. Meritor engineers a diverse range of products for OEMs, including Daimler, Navistar, and Volvo.

=== Business distribution ===
==== North America ====
Employing more than 4700 people, the business facilities in North America contain various distribution locations in Canada, multiple production plants in Mexico, and facilities of administration, production, distribution, sales, and technical centers in the United States.

==== South America ====
The Meritor business in South America, which was established in Brazil, employed more than 1700 employees as of 2013. There are four manufacturing facilities, one distribution center, two engineering centers, three administrative offices, and one sales office.

==== Europe ====
Also as of 2013, Meritor has administrative offices distributed in France, Netherlands, Russia, Switzerland, Turkey, and United Kingdom, and production facilities in Italy, Sweden, Belgium, United Kingdom, as well as France, and one sales location in Spain.

==== Asia Pacific ====
Meritor builds products in Australia and Singapore, as has development joint ventures, distribution centers, and sales locations in China and India. In 2013, the company employed nearly 1800 employees in Asia Pacific region and had been present in the region for close to 30 years.
