= New Flyer =

Canadian multinational bus manufacturer

New Flyer Industries
- Formerly: Western Auto and Truck Body Works (1930–1948); Western Flyer Coach (1948–1971); Flyer Industries Limited (1971–1986); New Flyer Industries Limited (1986–2005)
- Type: Subsidiary
- Industry: Bus manufacturing
- Founded: 1930 (as Western Auto and Truck Body Works Ltd)
- Founder: John Coval (original) Jan den Oudsten (current)
- Headquarters: Winnipeg, Manitoba, Canada
- Area served: North America
- Key people: Chris Stoddart (President)
- Parent: NFI Group
- Subsidiaries: New Flyer Industries Canada ULC; New Flyer of America
- Website: newflyer.com

New Flyer Industries is a bus manufacturer headquartered in Winnipeg, Manitoba, Canada. It specializes in the production of transit buses. New Flyer is owned by the NFI Group, a holding company for several bus manufacturers. New Flyer has several manufacturing facilities in Canada and the United States that produce the company's main product, the New Flyer Xcelsior family of buses.

This company was formed in 1930 as Western Auto and Truck Body Works Ltd. as a company that primarily sold buses in Western Canada before changing its name to Western Flyer Coach in 1948. Western Flyer Coach was taken over by the Government of Manitoba in 1971, becoming Flyer Industries Limited and was acquired by Dutch-based manufacturer Den Oudsten in 1986, renaming Flyer to New Flyer Industries Limited. KPS Capital acquired New Flyer in 2002, resulting the manufacturer going public in 2005, becoming New Flyer Industries Canada ULC.

New Flyer operates multiple production plants in Winnipeg, Manitoba; which is its main Canadian plant, while it runs three additional American bus production plants under its New Flyer of America subsidiary in Crookston and St. Cloud, Minnesota for customers in the northern United States, and Anniston, Alabama, which was the former production facility of North American Bus Industries, that New Flyer acquired in 2013 and since 2015 for customers serving the southern part of the country.

== History ==
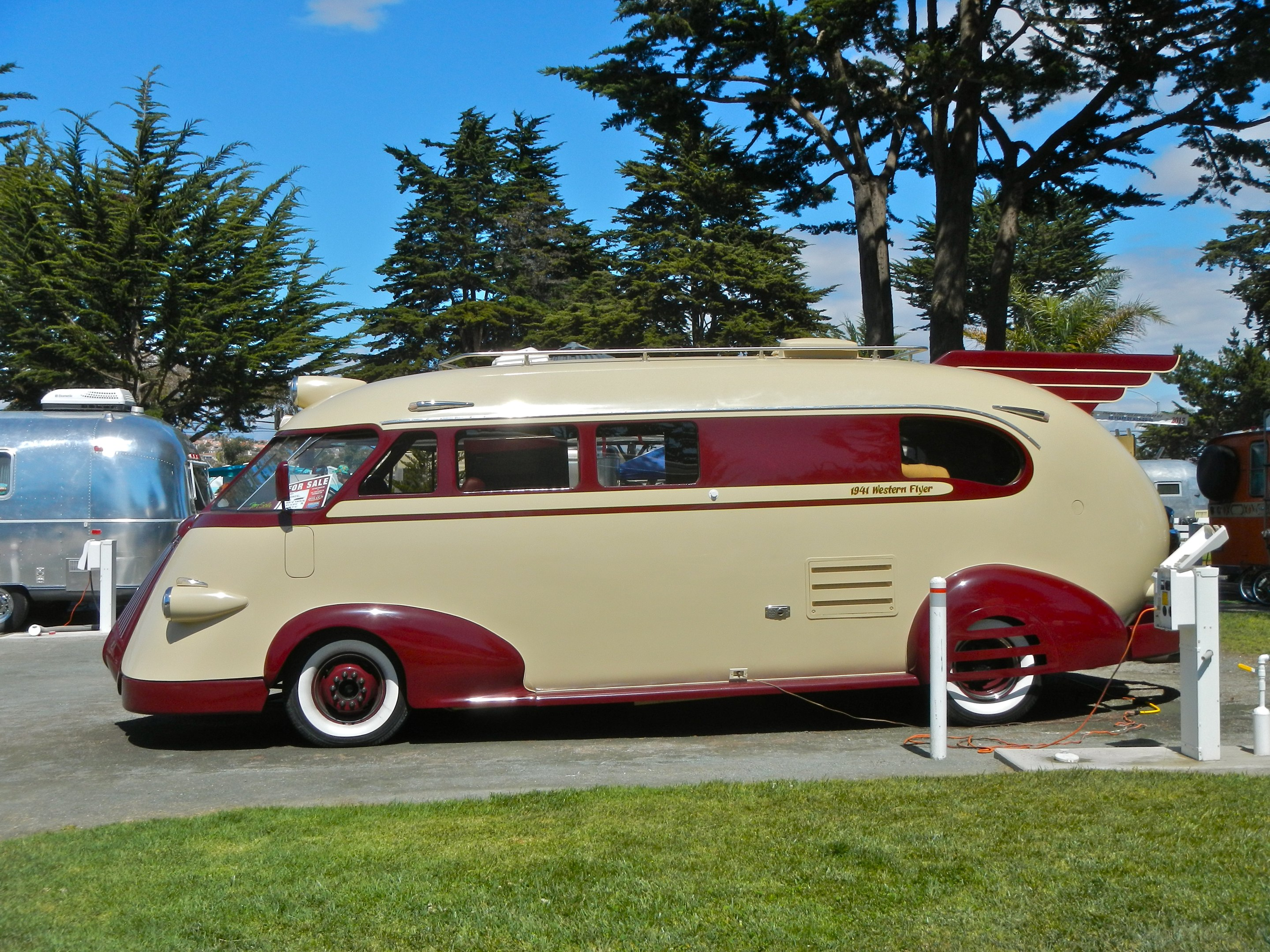
1941 Western Flyer

The company was founded by John Coval in 1930 as the Western Auto and Truck Body Works Ltd. in Manitoba. The company began producing buses in 1937, selling their first full buses to Grey Goose Bus Lines in 1937, before releasing their Western Flyer bus model in 1941, prompting the company to change its name to Western Flyer Coach in 1948.

In the 1960s, the company further focused on the urban transit bus market. In 1971, the then-financially struggling Western Flyer was sold to the Manitoba Development Corporation, an agency of the government of Manitoba, and renamed Flyer Industries Limited. In 1974, the opposition of the Progressive Conservative Party of Manitoba had urged the NDP government in power to divest Flyer Industries from government ownership.

On July 15, 1986, Jan den Oudsten, a descendant of the family who formed Dutch bus manufacturer Den Oudsten Bussen BV, purchased Flyer Industries from the Manitoba government, changing its name to New Flyer Industries Limited.

New Flyer designed and tested North America's first low-floor bus in 1988 and delivered the first production model, called the D40LF, to the Port Authority of New York and New Jersey in 1991. In 1994, New Flyer delivered the first compressed natural gas bus in North America and the world's first hydrogen fuel cell powered bus. In 1995, the company delivered the first low-floor articulated bus in North America to Strathcona County Transit.

In March 2002, New Flyer was acquired by KPS Capital Partners, an investment company that specializes in turning around struggling businesses, for $44 million. Later that year Jan den Oudsten retired as CEO. He was later inducted into the American Public Transportation Association's Hall of Fame for his work at the company.

In 2003, King County Metro in Seattle placed an order for 213 hybrid buses, the world's first large order for hybrid buses.

On December 15, 2003, New Flyer was purchased by private equity firms Harvest Partners and Lightyear Capital. The company's CEO, John Marinucci, called the purchase an indicator that the company's operational and financial turnaround had been accomplished.

On August 19, 2005, New Flyer became a publicly traded company on the Toronto Stock Exchange, renaming the company to New Flyer Industries Canada ULC and creating the publicly traded parent company NFI Group Inc. 2005 also saw a restyling of New Flyer's popular low-floor coaches with new front and rear endcaps, to modernize and streamline the exterior appearance of the bus.

In June 2012 New Flyer, in a joint venture with Mitsubishi Heavy Industries, the Manitoba Government, Manitoba Hydro and Red River College, unveiled a fully electric battery-powered bus.

In May 2012, New Flyer and Alexander Dennis announced a joint venture to design and manufacture medium-duty low-floor bus (or midi bus) for the North American market. The bus, called the New Flyer MiDi, was based on the design of the Alexander Dennis Enviro200. Alexander Dennis engineered and tested the bus, and it was built and marketed by New Flyer under contract. During the partnership around 200 buses were delivered to 22 operators in Canada and the U.S. In May 2017, New Flyer and Alexander Dennis announced their joint venture would end and production of the bus would transition to Alexander Dennis' new North American factory in Indiana, where it is produced alongside the double-deck Enviro500 series bus. Alexander Dennis was later purchased by New Flyer's parent company, NFI Group, in 2019.

== Facilities ==
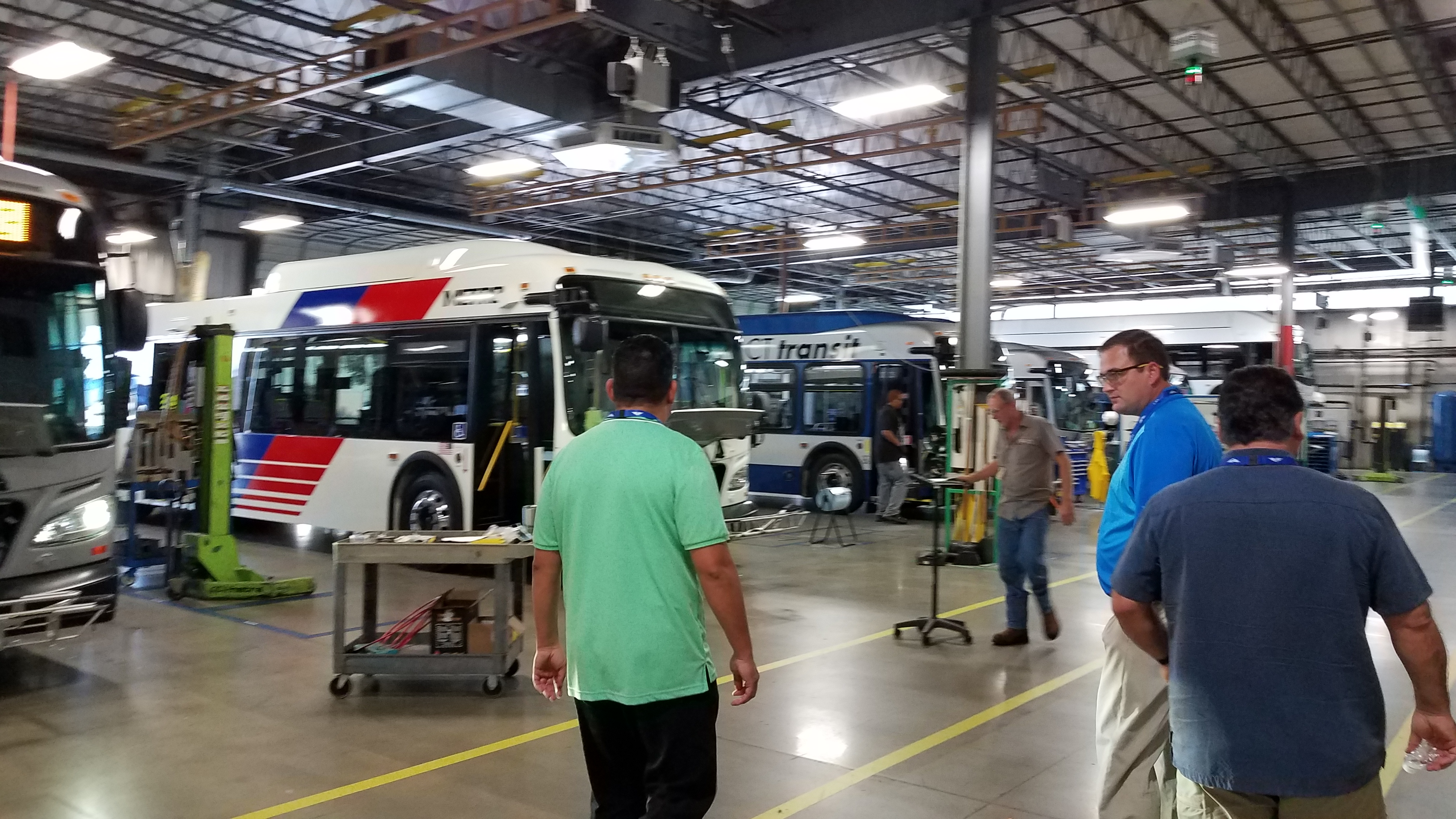
Interior of the New Flyer plant in Anniston, Alabama, 2017

New Flyer's corporate headquarters are located in Winnipeg. Manufacturing facilities are located in Winnipeg; Anniston, Alabama (formerly North American Bus Industries); Crookston, Minnesota (relocated from Grand Forks, North Dakota); Jamestown, New York (former Quality Markets grocery store); and St. Cloud, Minnesota. The company also operates a network of service centers and parts distribution facilities.

== Models ==
Model	Length	Width	Introduced	Discontinued	Image
Xcelsior	35 ft (10.7 m); 40 ft (12.2 m); 60 ft (18.3 m)	102 in (2.6 m)	2008	in production	
Low Floor	30 ft 6 in (9.3 m); 35 ft 6 in (10.8 m); 40 ft 10 1/4 in (12.5 m); 60 ft 8 1/2 in (18.5 m)	102 in (2.6 m)	1989	2014	
Invero	41 ft 3 in (12.6 m)	102 in (2.6 m)	2002	2007	
High Floor	35 ft 3 in (10.7 m); 40 ft 6 1/4 in (12.4 m); 60 ft 8 in (18.5 m)	102 in (2.6 m)	1987	2006	
700/800/900	35 ft (10.7 m); 40 ft (12.2 m)	96 in (2.4 m); 102 in (2.6 m)	1967	1987	
