= Orion I =

Transit bus

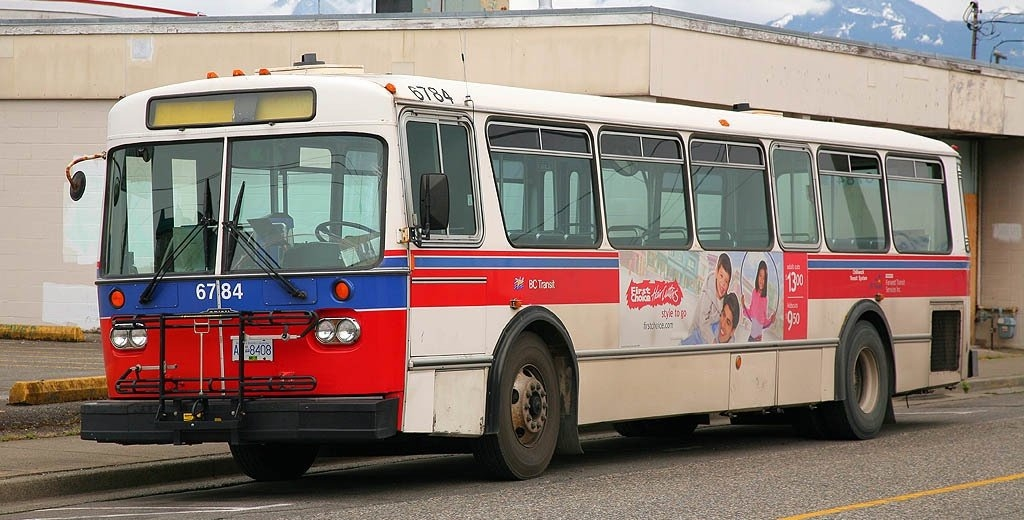
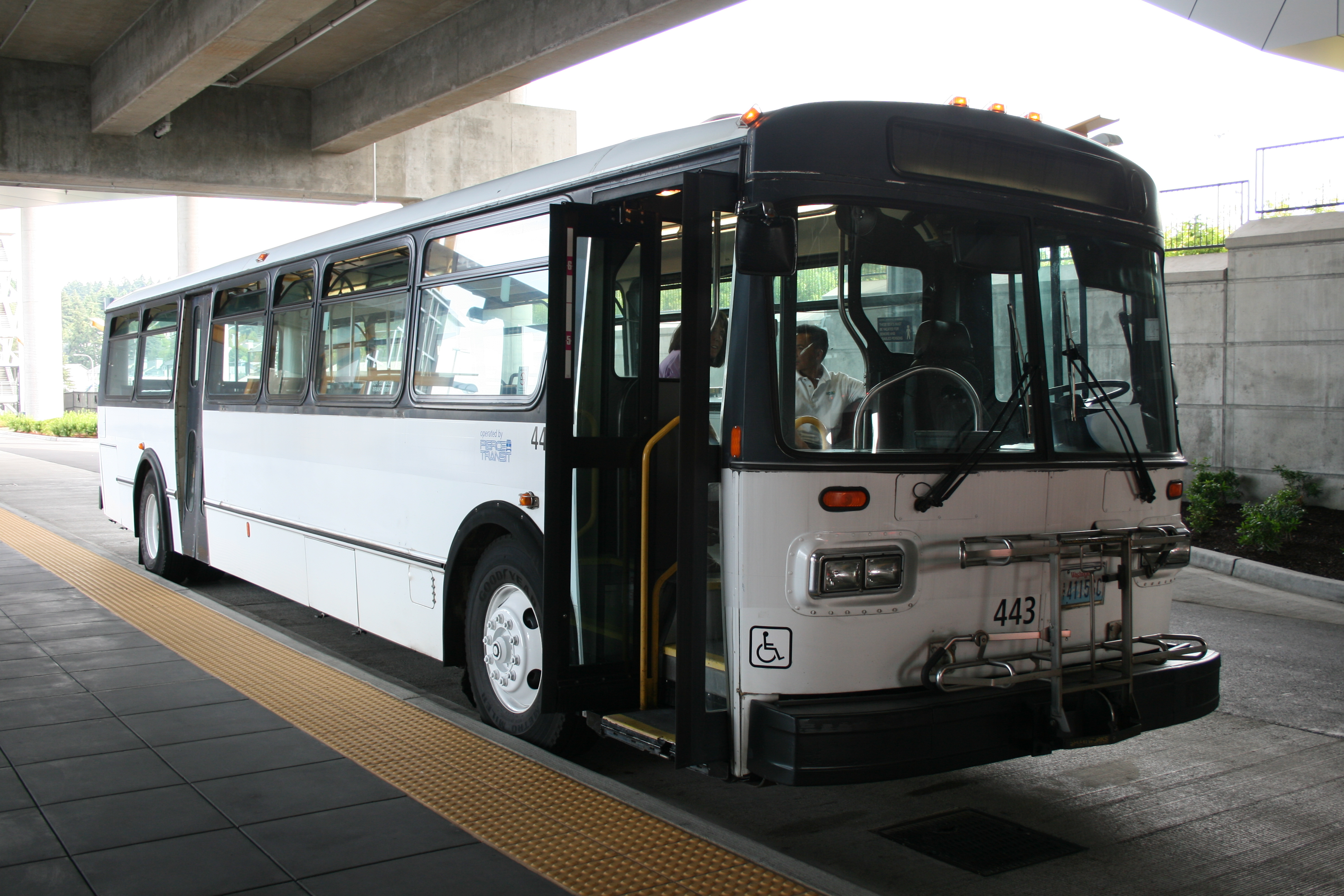
- Orion I buses Top: Original production (round headlights); Bottom: Late production (square headlights)

Overview
- Manufacturer: Ontario Bus Industries
- Production: 1978–1993
- Assembly: Canada: Mississauga, Ontario; United States: Oriskany, New York

Body and chassis
- Class: Transit bus
- Body style: Monocoque, all-welded steel frame
- Layout: RR

Powertrain
- Engine: DD 6V53; DD 6V71/6V71N/6V71TA; DD 6V92TA; Cummins L10/L10G
- Transmission: Allison MT643

Dimensions
- Wheelbase: 180 in (4.57 m) (30')
- Length: over bumpers: 376 in (9.6 m) (30'); 437 in (11.1 m) (35')
- Width: 96 in (2.44 m) [30' or 35']
- Height: 114 in (2.90 m)
- Curb weight: 19,250 lb (8,700 kg) (30'); 20,500 lb (9,300 kg) (35')

Chronology
- Successor: Orion V; Orion VI

The Orion I was a line of rigid high-floor transit buses made in 30-, 35-, and 40-foot lengths by Ontario Bus & Truck (renamed to Ontario Bus Industries (OBI) in 1977) between 1976 and 1993 for the Canadian and United States mass transportation markets. The Orion I was the first bus offered by OBI and was available in transit (2-door) and coach/suburban (1-door) models. It was replaced by the rigid Orion V (introduced in 1989) and low-floor Orion VI (introduced in 1993).

A licensed version of the 30-foot model was produced by Transportation Manufacturing Corporation (TMC) as the T-30 Citycruiser from 1979 to 1982.

== Design ==
The bus was available in both transit (two-door) and suburban (single front door) configurations; in addition, OBI used the Orion I to produce an ambulance and a motorhome. It uses a welded monocoque steel tube frame clad with steel panels. Although a prototype was produced in 1976, serial production did not begin until 1978. The 30-foot Orion I filled the "medium" transit bus segment left vacant by the withdrawal of the 30-foot GM New Look (discontinued in 1974) and Flxible New Look buses (discontinued in 1976); by 1982, TMC (a licensee of the Orion I design) was dominating the U.S. market for medium transit buses, alongside Blue Bird Corporation's City Bird.

OBI marketed the Orion I to both the Canadian and United States transit markets. Canadian buses were assembled at the OBI plant in Mississauga, Ontario. For the US market, to meet 'Buy America' requirements for federally subsidized transit vehicles, the Orion I was initially produced under license before OBI incorporated the wholly owned subsidiary Bus Industries of America (BIA) in 1981 to assemble the Orion I in Oriskany, New York.

TMC marketed the T-30 Citycruiser as an ideal vehicle for smaller transit agencies; although it only seated approximately 2/3 as many passengers as a typical 40-foot transit bus (31 versus 47), it offered better fuel economy at 7.7 mpg_{‑US} (0.31 L/km), compared to 4.5 to 6 mpg_{‑US} (0.52 to 0.39 L/km), with a turning radius of 28 feet (8.5 m). Eventually OBI began producing larger Orion I buses, introducing a 35-foot model in 1979 and a 40-foot model in 1984.

=== Models ===
Internally, OBI designated the bus model as 01.5xx, with xx denoting a combination of vehicle length and door configuration.

Model number	Length		Width	Type	Years produced	Fuel
Model number	Nominal	Actual	Width	Type	Years produced	Fuel
01.501	30 feet	31 ft 7 in (9.6 m)	96 in (2.4 m)	transit	1976–1993	diesel or CNG (from 1988)
01.502	30 feet	31 ft 7 in (9.6 m)	96 in (2.4 m)	transit	1976–1993	diesel or CNG (from 1988)
01.503	30 feet	31 ft 7 in (9.6 m)	96 in (2.4 m)	suburban	1976–1993	diesel or CNG (from 1988)
01.504	35 feet	36 ft 8 in (11.2 m)	96 in (2.4 m)	transit	1979–1993	diesel or CNG (from 1988)
01.505	35 feet	36 ft 8 in (11.2 m)	96 in (2.4 m)	suburban	1979–1993	diesel or CNG (from 1988)
01.506	35 feet	36 ft 8 in (11.2 m)	96 in (2.4 m)	transit	1979–1993	diesel or CNG (from 1988)
01.507	35 feet	36 ft 8 in (11.2 m)	96 in (2.4 m)	transit	1979–1993	diesel or CNG (from 1988)
01.508	40 feet	40 ft 7 in (12.4 m)	96 in (2.4 m)	transit	1984–1993	diesel or CNG (from 1988)
01.509	40 feet	40 ft 7 in (12.4 m)	96 in (2.4 m)	suburban	1984–1993	diesel or CNG (from 1988)
01.510	35 feet	36 ft 8 in (11.2 m)	96 in (2.4 m)	suburban	1984–1993	diesel or CNG (from 1988)

==== Citycruiser ====
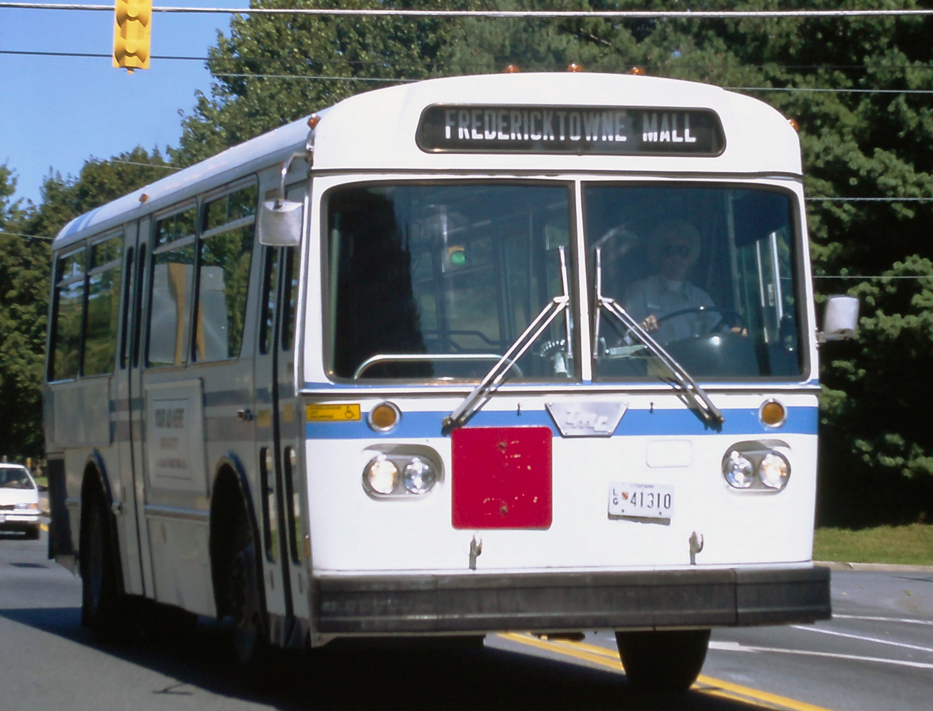
A TMC T-30 Citycruiser

Transportation Manufacturing Corporation (TMC), a subsidiary of Greyhound Lines, began manufacturing buses in Roswell, New Mexico in 1975, producing approximately 450 per year to replace older suburban coaches for its parent company. Because Greyhound retired its coaches seasonally, production at TMC was inconsistent, and TMC acquired a license from OBI to produce the Citycruiser in 1979, ensuring that year-round work could be sustained. TMC unveiled its first Citycruiser on May 31, 1979, during dedication ceremonies for the new factory. The entire 1979 production had already been sold.

TMC sold its license back to OBI in 1981, and the last Citycruiser left Roswell in 1982. OBI, as BIA, subsequently assembled Orion I buses for the United States transit market in Oriskany, New York, starting production in June 1982.

==== CNG ====
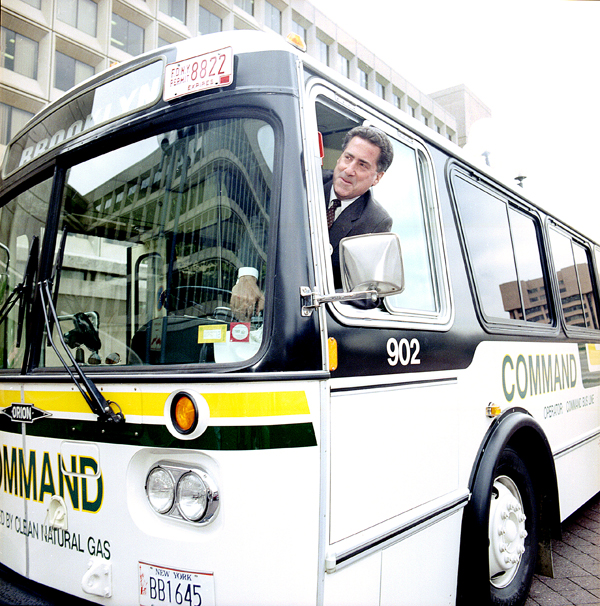
U.S. Energy Secretary John S. Herrington driving a CNG-powered Orion I in 1988.

In 1988, two 40-foot Orion I buses were converted to run on compressed natural gas (CNG) by Brooklyn Union Gas Company and placed into express route service by Command Bus.

== Deployment ==
The Orion I was OBI's initial transit bus. Customers included many small transit agencies.

By 1984, more than 1,400 Orion I buses had been produced, including approximately 950 Citycruisers built under license by TMC. The Mississauga and Oriskany factories had a capacity of three and ten buses every two weeks, respectively.

== Competition ==
- Flxible New Look
- Flyer D700
- GM New Look bus
- Rapid Transit Series
