= Orion VII =

Low-floor transit bus

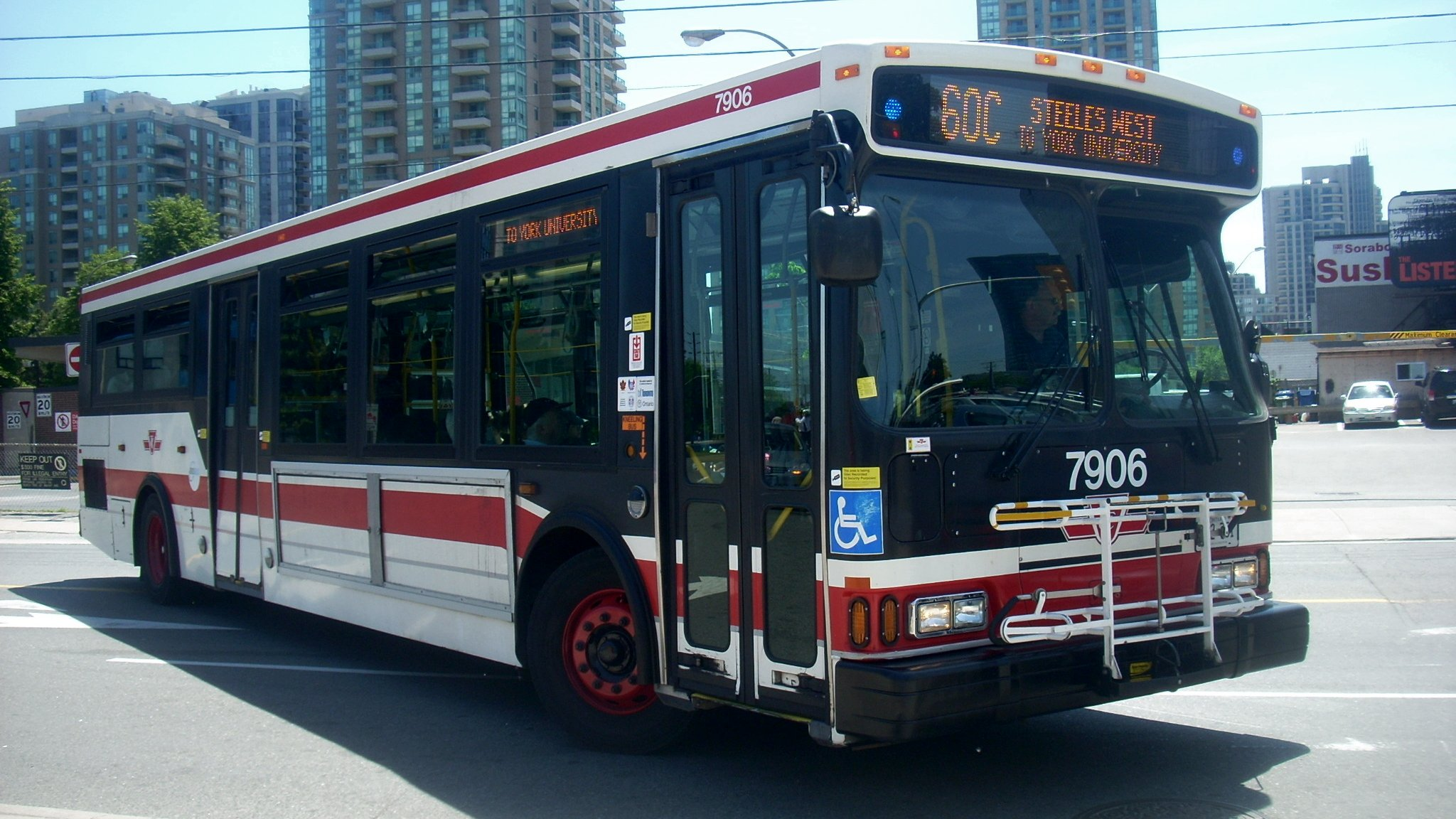
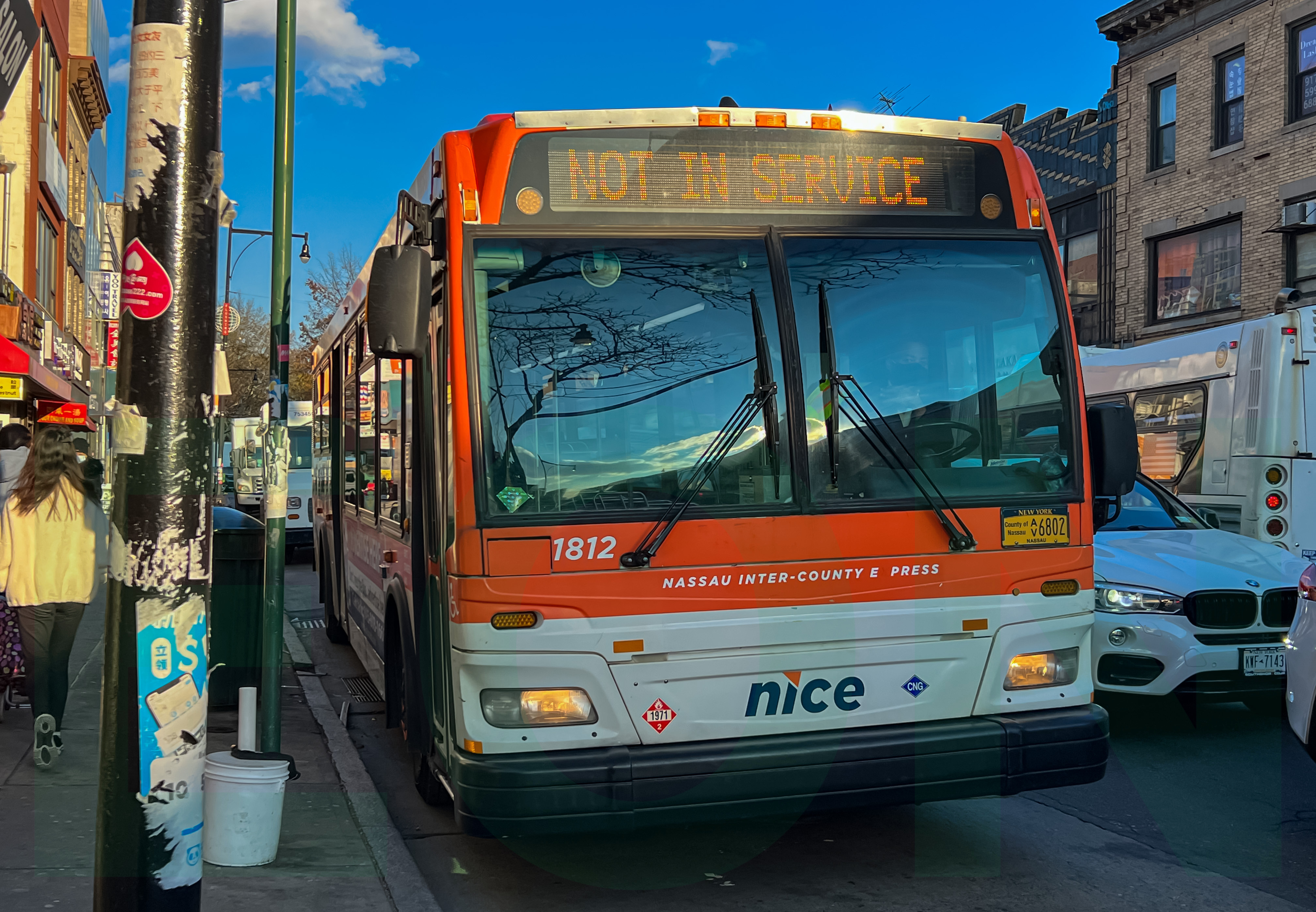
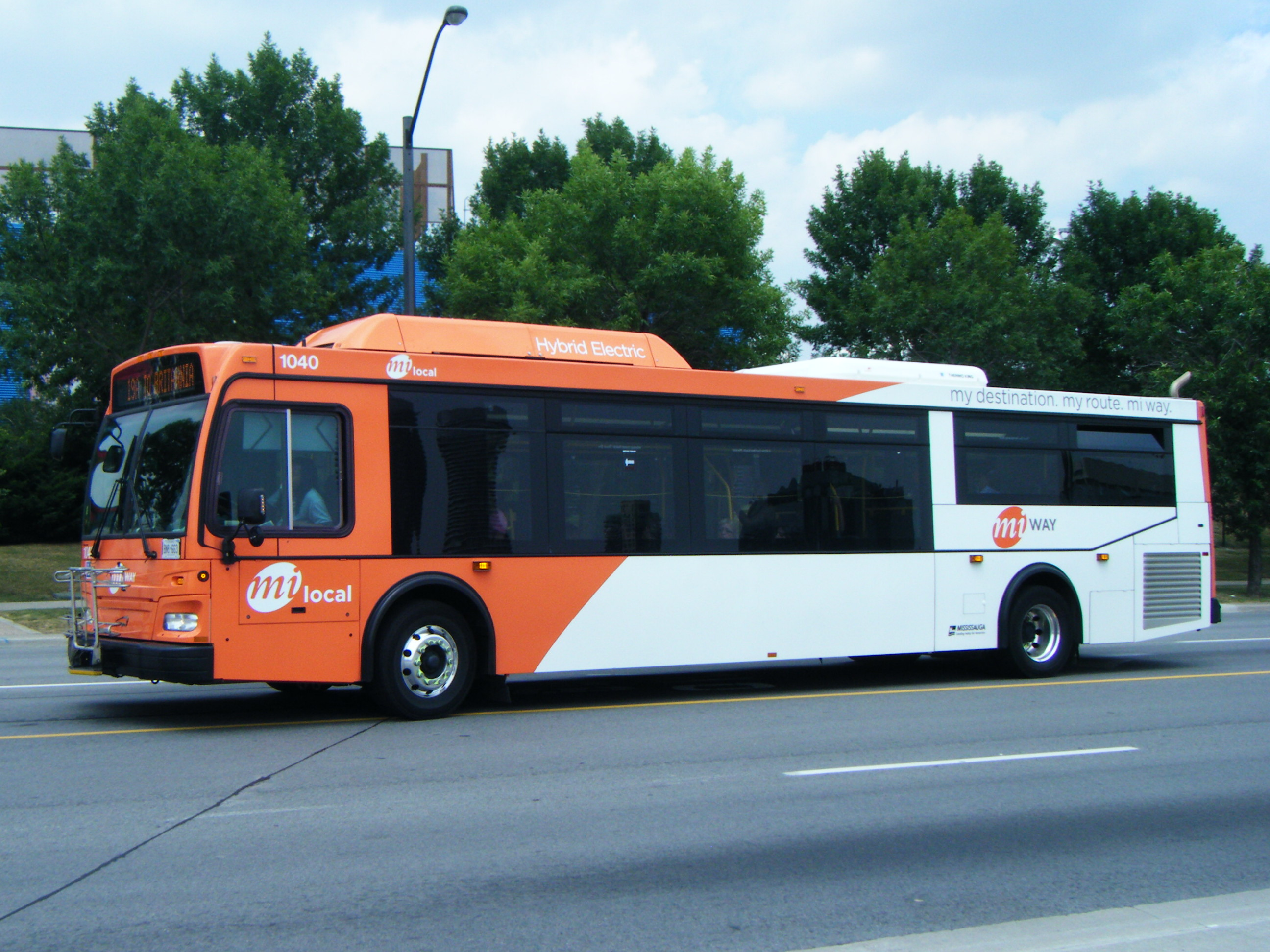
- Top: 2006 Orion VII OG Diesel, TTC; Middle: 2010 Orion VII NG CNG, NICE Bus; Bottom: 2010 Orion VII EPA10 Hybrid, MiWay

Overview
- Manufacturer: Daimler Buses North America (Orion Bus Industries)
- Production: 2001–07 (Original); 2007–10 (Next Gen); 2011–13 (EPA10)
- Assembly: United States: Oriskany, New York; Canada: Mississauga, Ontario

Body and chassis
- Class: Transit bus
- Body style: Monocoque
- Layout: RR

Powertrain
- Engine: Diesel buses: Cummins ISL (OG, NG), Cummins ISL9 (NG, EPA10), Detroit Diesel Series 50 (OG); CNG buses: Cummins L Gas Plus (OG, NG) Cummins ISL-G (NG, EPA10) Detroit Diesel Series 50G (OG); Hybrid buses: Cummins B5.9 (OG), Cummins ISB (NG), Cummins ISB6.7 (EPA10)
- Transmission: Allison; Voith; ZF

Dimensions
- Wheelbase: 190 in (4.83 m) (30' NG); 226 in (5.74 m) (35' NG); 286 in (7.26 m) (40' NG)
- Length: over bumpers: 33 ft 2.23 in (10.1 m) (30' NG); 36 ft 2.23 in (11.0 m) (35' NG); 41 ft 2.23 in (12.6 m) (40' NG)
- Width: 101.8 in (2.59 m)
- Height: 127 to 133 in (3.23 to 3.38 m)
- Curb weight: 27,950 to 30,220 lb (12,700 to 13,700 kg) (40'); 29,730 to 31,610 lb (13,500 to 14,300 kg) (40' EPA10)

Chronology
- Predecessor: Orion V; Orion VI

The Orion VII is a line of low-floor transit buses available in 30' rigid, 35' rigid, and 40' rigid lengths manufactured by Daimler Buses North America's subsidiary Orion Bus Industries between 2001 and 2013 in three generations. The conventional powered buses, either with longitudinally-mounted diesel or natural gas engines, used a T-drive transmission coupling. A series hybrid variant powered by a diesel-driven generator was also available. The Orion VII replaced the fully low-floor Orion VI and high-floor Orion V buses, and was manufactured until its parent company DaimlerChrysler withdrew from the transit bus market in 2013.

== Design ==
The two-piece windshield of the original Orion VII has the driver's windshield canted towards the back of the bus to reduce reflections; the second and third generations also had a two-piece windshield, but both panes are curved similarly and collectively resemble a single piece. Externally, the three generations may also be distinguished by the position of the top of the doors. In the original Orion VII, the top of both the front and rear doors is at the same level as the top of the side windows. In the Orion VII Next Generation (VIING), the top of the front door is at the level as the bottom of the standee windows. In the Orion VII EPA10, the tops of both doors are at the height of the bottom of the standee windows.

The Orion VII uses a monocoque stainless steel frame clad with aluminum and fiberglass panels. The interior floor height is 15.5 inches (390 mm) except for the portion starting at the rear wheels, which is elevated to provide mechanical clearance for the engine and transmission. All conventional (diesel/CNG) buses use longitudinally-mounted engines with a T-drive transmission coupling driving the rear axle.

=== Series Hybrid ===
Lockheed Martin Control Systems (later acquired by BAE Systems) developed the HybriDrive™ series hybrid propulsion system used in the Orion VII. In this system, the diesel engine is mounted transversely and drives a generator, and an electric motor drives the wheels directly. A roof-mounted battery pack supplies additional power for acceleration and hill-climbing. The traction motor is rated at 250 hp (190 kW) continuous and 320 hp (240 kW) peak, offering a stall torque of 2,700 lb⋅ft (3,700 N⋅m). The traction motor also operates as a generator for regenerative braking, with the power returned to the battery pack. According to a 2008 paper, the Orion VII hybrid buses, in service with New York City Transit since 2002, had per-mile maintenance costs comparable to CNG-fueled buses, with improved overall operating costs per mile mainly due to better fuel economy (3.00 to 3.22 mpg_{‑US} (0.78 to 0.73 L/km) for the hybrids evaluated, compared to 2.33 mpg_{‑US} (1.01 L/km) diesel equivalent for the CNG buses). In 2008, it was reported that Toronto Transit Commission's Orion hybrid bus fleet suffered from early failure of lead-acid batteries in roof-mounted battery pack and much lower fuel savings than expected.

=== Allison Hybrid ===
Orion announced the Allison Hybrid H 40 EP two-mode parallel/series hybrid system would be offered starting in 2011. A demonstration unit with this powertrain was delivered to DART.

== Deployment ==
The first operator of the Orion VII was Mississauga Transit (MiWay) for the first 14 production models powered by the Detroit Diesel Series 50 diesel engine. These buses were retired in 2013. MiWay also ordered 15 hybrid models and 35 diesel BRT models in 2010 and 2012, both of which are EPA10 models.

Although New York City had previously evaluated ten Orion VI and five NovaBus RTS buses equipped with series hybrid propulsion as a small pilot program starting in 1998, the first major deployment of hybrid buses were the 125 Orion VII HybriDrive buses ordered in 2001/02.

In 2013, New York MTA announced plans to convert approximately 1/4 of their hybrid fleet to solely conventional diesel power; after the warranty expired, the agency was not willing to bear the cost of traction motor replacement. However, only two buses, both now retired have been converted.

The Toronto Transit Commission is another notable operator of the Orion VII, having purchased buses in both diesel and series hybrid diesel-electric propulsion configurations between 2002 and 2012. As of 2026, the Orion VII buses remain in service and maintained at Arrow Road, Malvern, Mount Dennis, Queensway and Wilson garages. At 879 diesel buses ordered, they were the largest operator of Orion VII diesel buses in North America.

The San Francisco Municipal Railway (SF Muni) announced the acquisition of 86 series hybrid Orion VII buses in 2004, delivered in the last half of 2007; however, the hybrid buses proved to be unreliable.

Two Orion VII Hybrids are also operated by the Edmonton Transit System. Both buses were built in 2006.

== Models ==
Generation	Image	Model	Length	Production years	Powertrains
Original Generation		07.501	40 feet (12 m)	2001–2007	Diesel, CNG, Hybrid
Original Generation		07.502	35 feet (11 m)	2001–2007	Diesel, CNG, Hybrid
Original Generation		07.503	32.5 feet (9.9 m)	2001–2007	Diesel, CNG, Hybrid
Next Generation		07.501	40 feet (12 m)	2007-2010	Diesel, CNG, Hybrid
Next Generation		07.502	35 feet (11 m)	2007-2010	Diesel, CNG, Hybrid
Next Generation		07.503	32.5 feet (9.9 m)	2007-2010	Diesel, CNG, Hybrid
EPA10		07.501	40 feet (12 m)	2011-2013	Diesel, CNG, Hybrid
EPA10		07.502	35 feet (11 m)	2011-2013	Diesel, CNG, Hybrid
EPA10		07.503	32.5 feet (9.9 m)	2011-2013	Diesel, CNG, Hybrid

== Competition ==
- NABI LFW
- New Flyer Low Floor
- New Flyer Xcelsior
- Nova Bus LF Series
- Gillig Low Floor
- ENC Axess

== Gallery ==
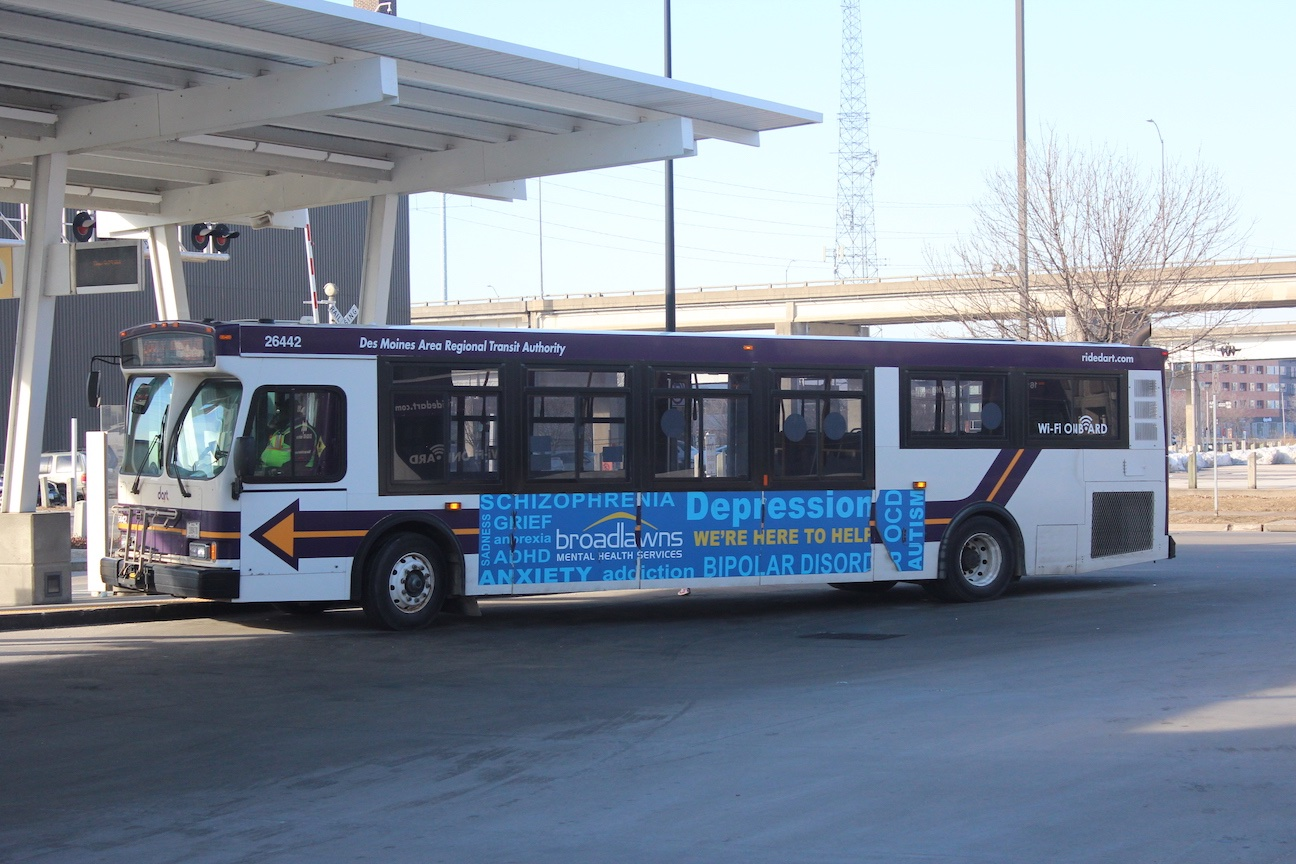
2006 Orion VII operated by DART

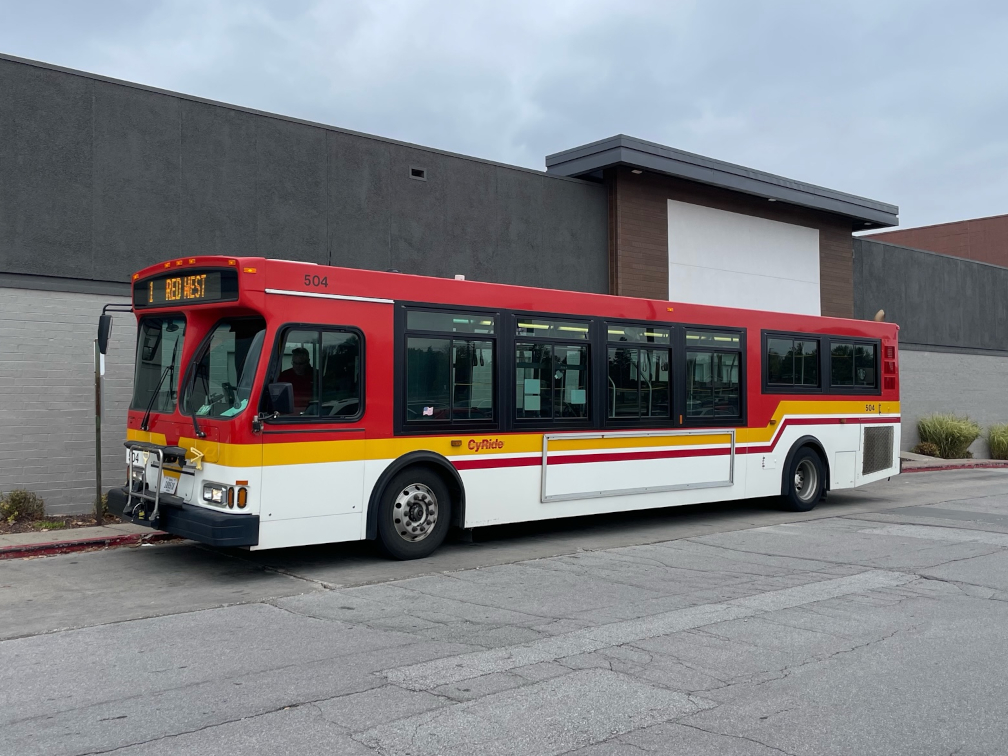
2006 Orion VII operated by CyRide

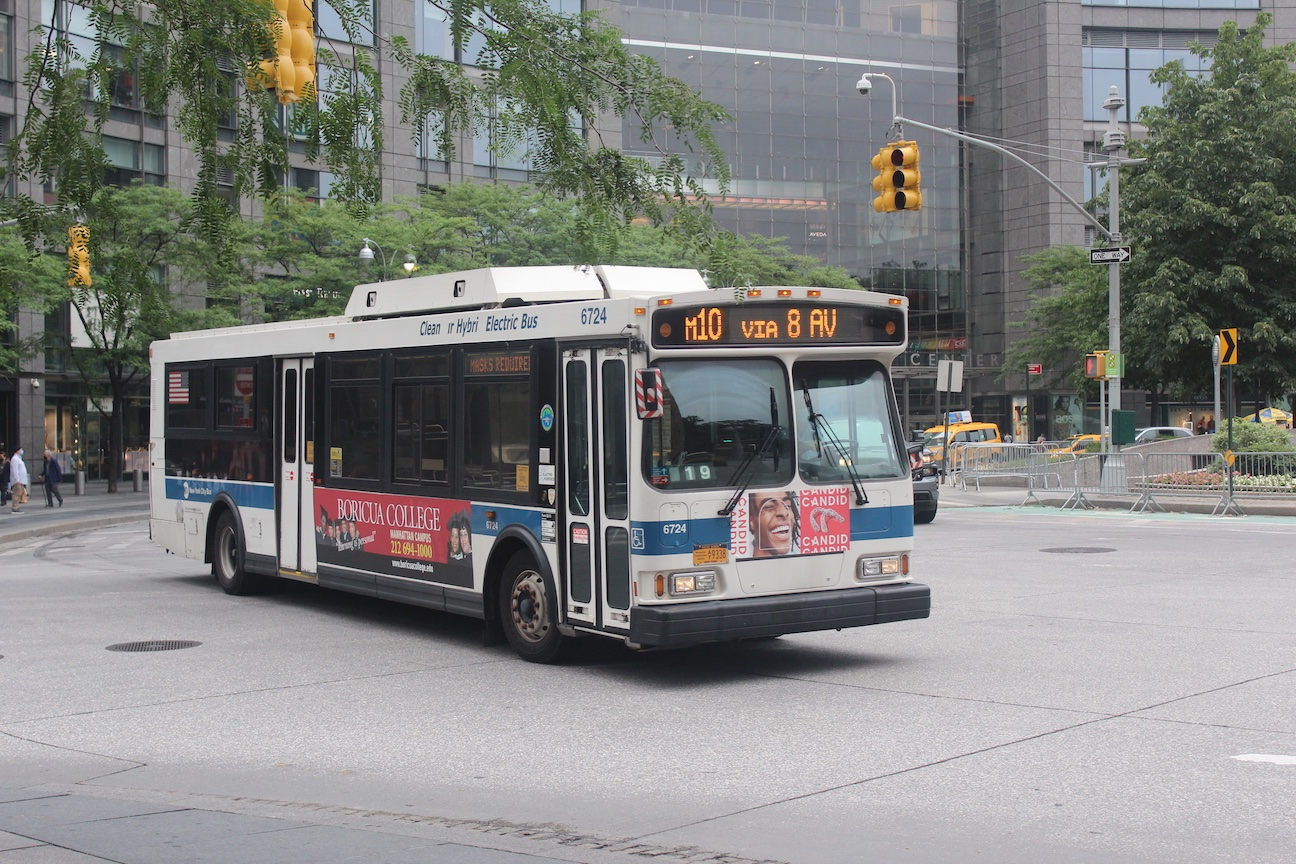
2006 Orion VII HEV operated by MTA

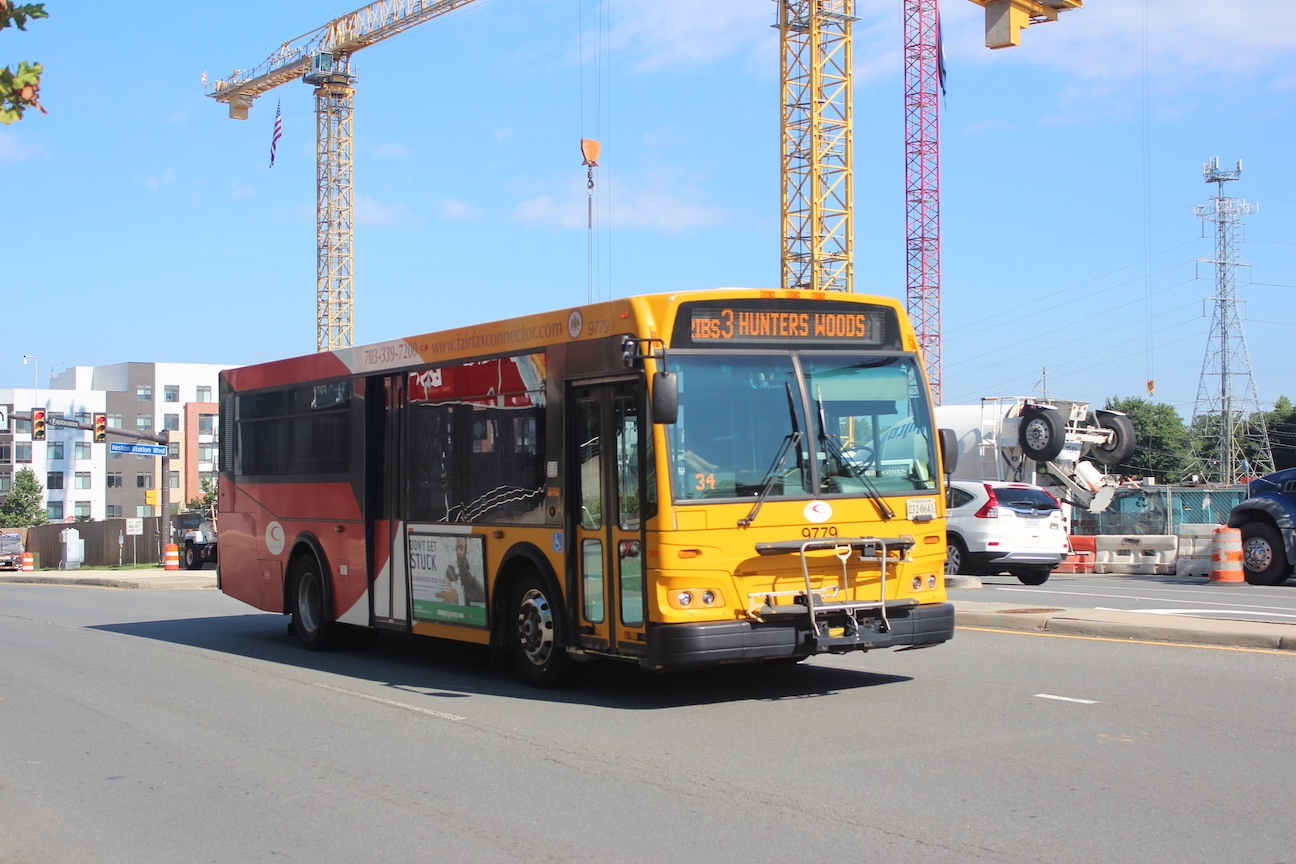
2008 Orion VII NG operated by Fairfax Connector

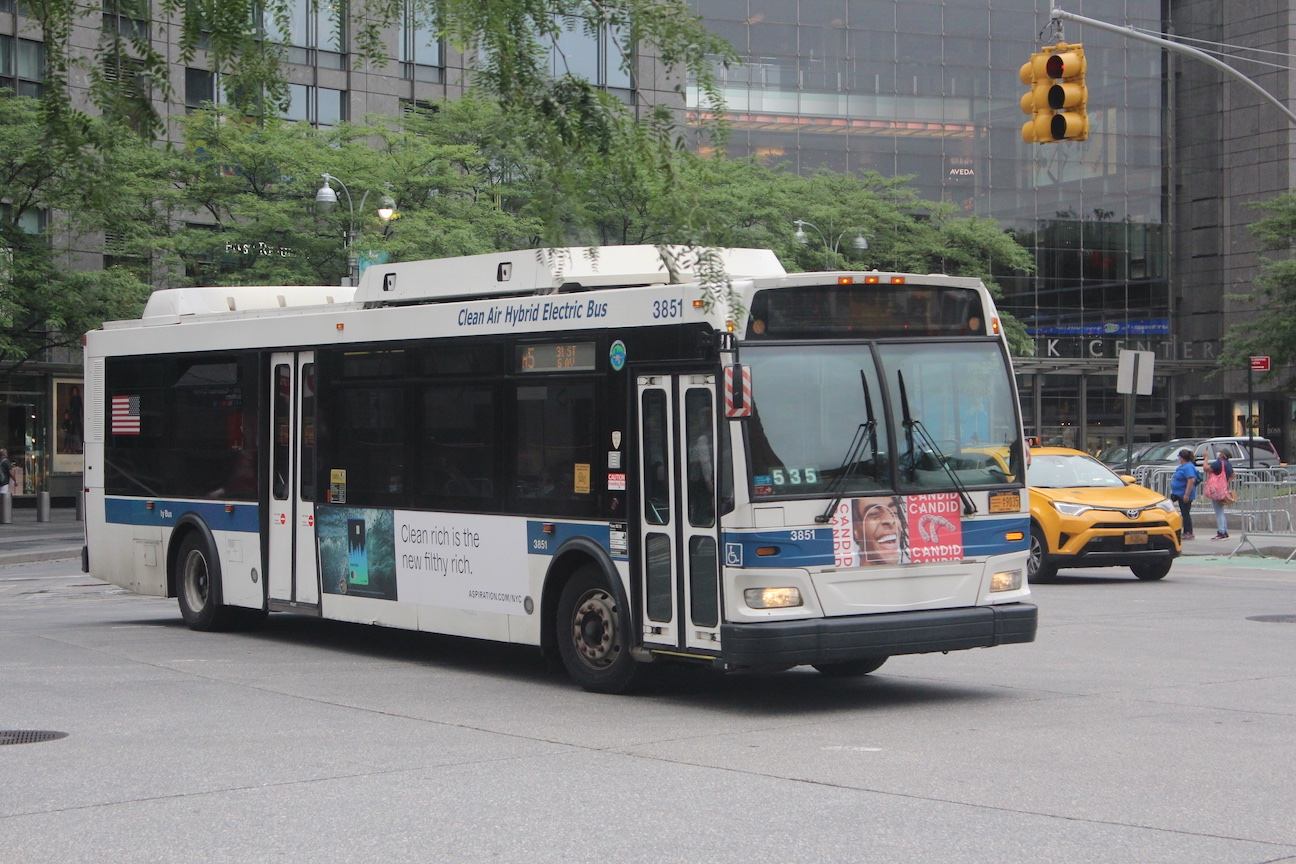
2008 Orion VII NG HEV operated by MTA

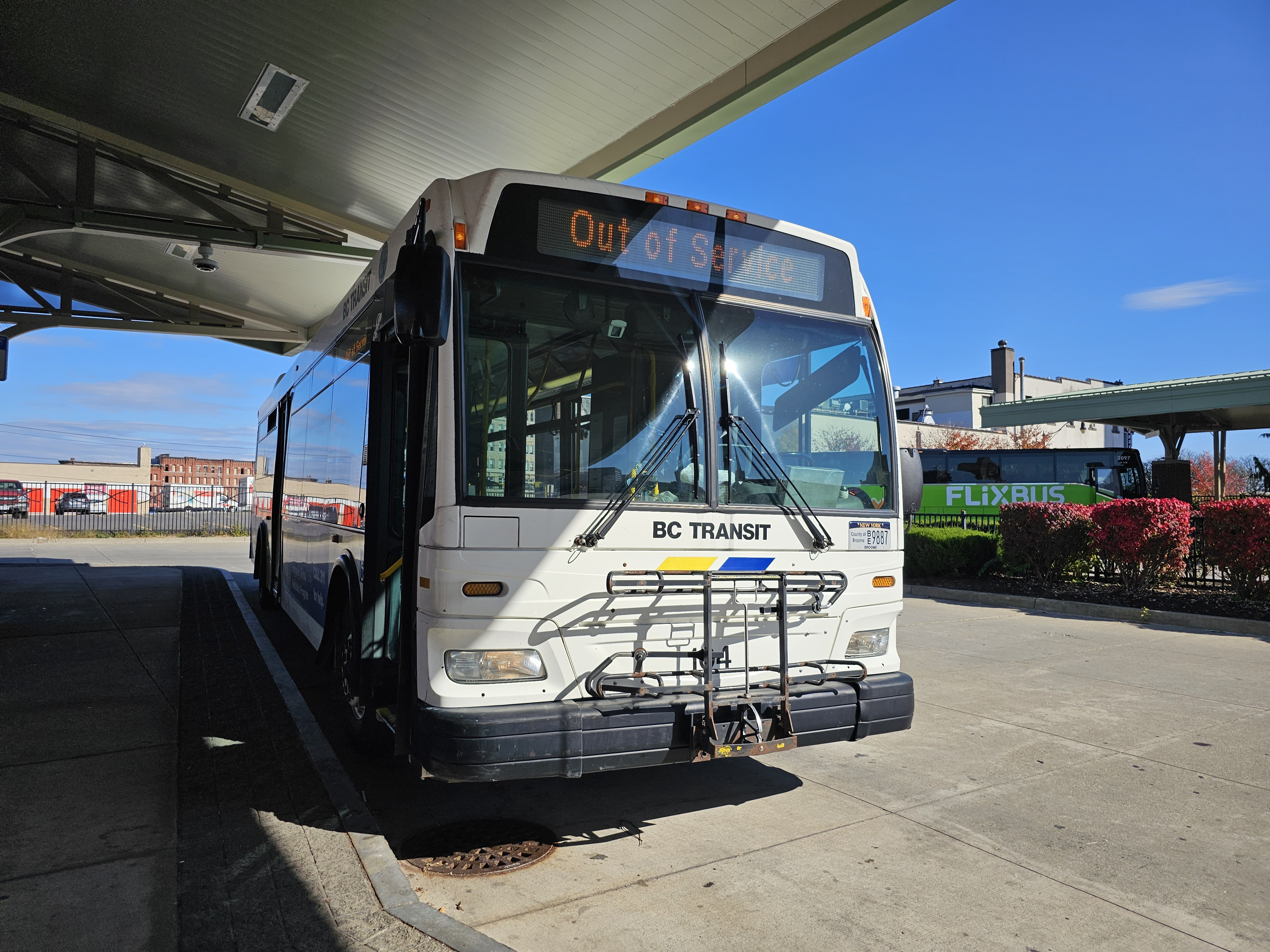
2008 Broome County Transit Orion VII Next Generation

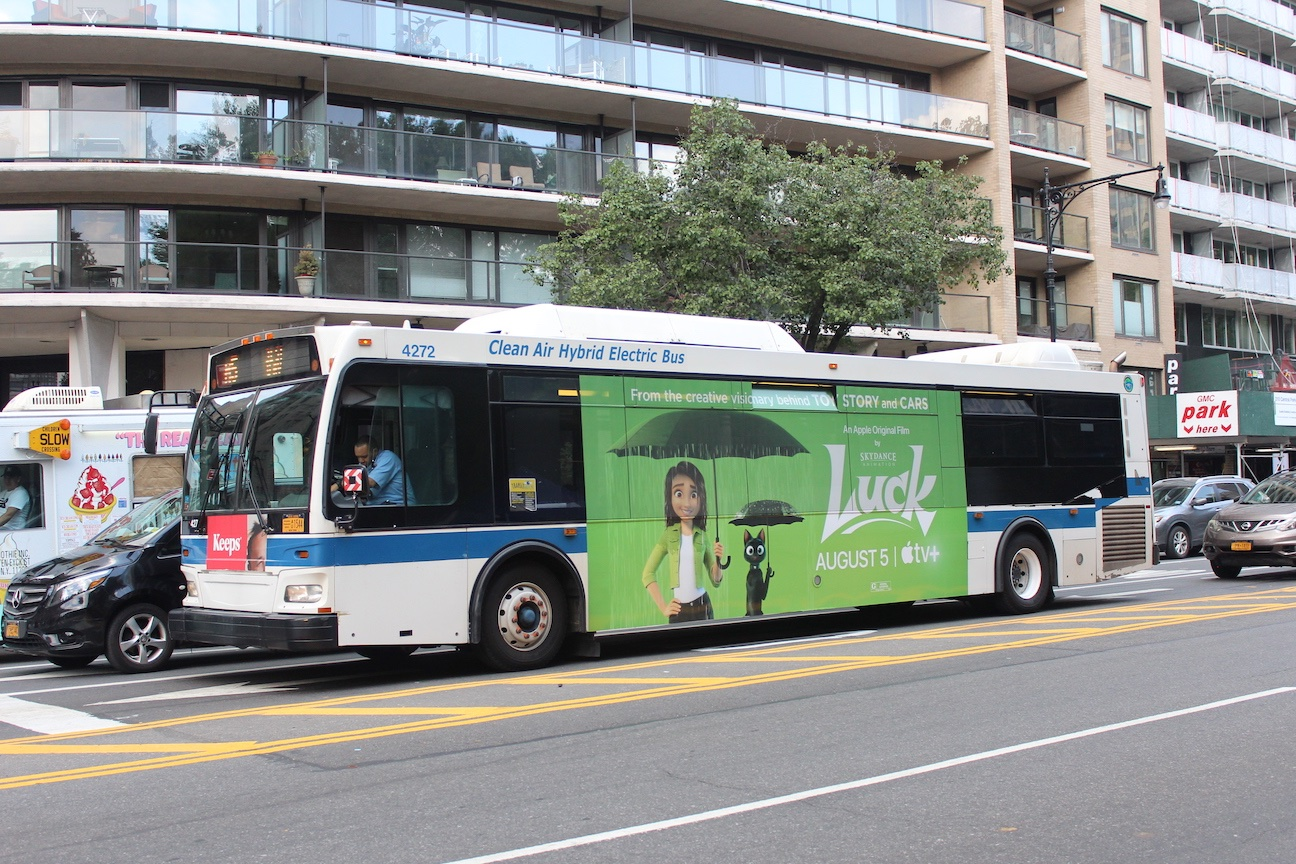
2009 Orion VII NG HEV operated by MTA

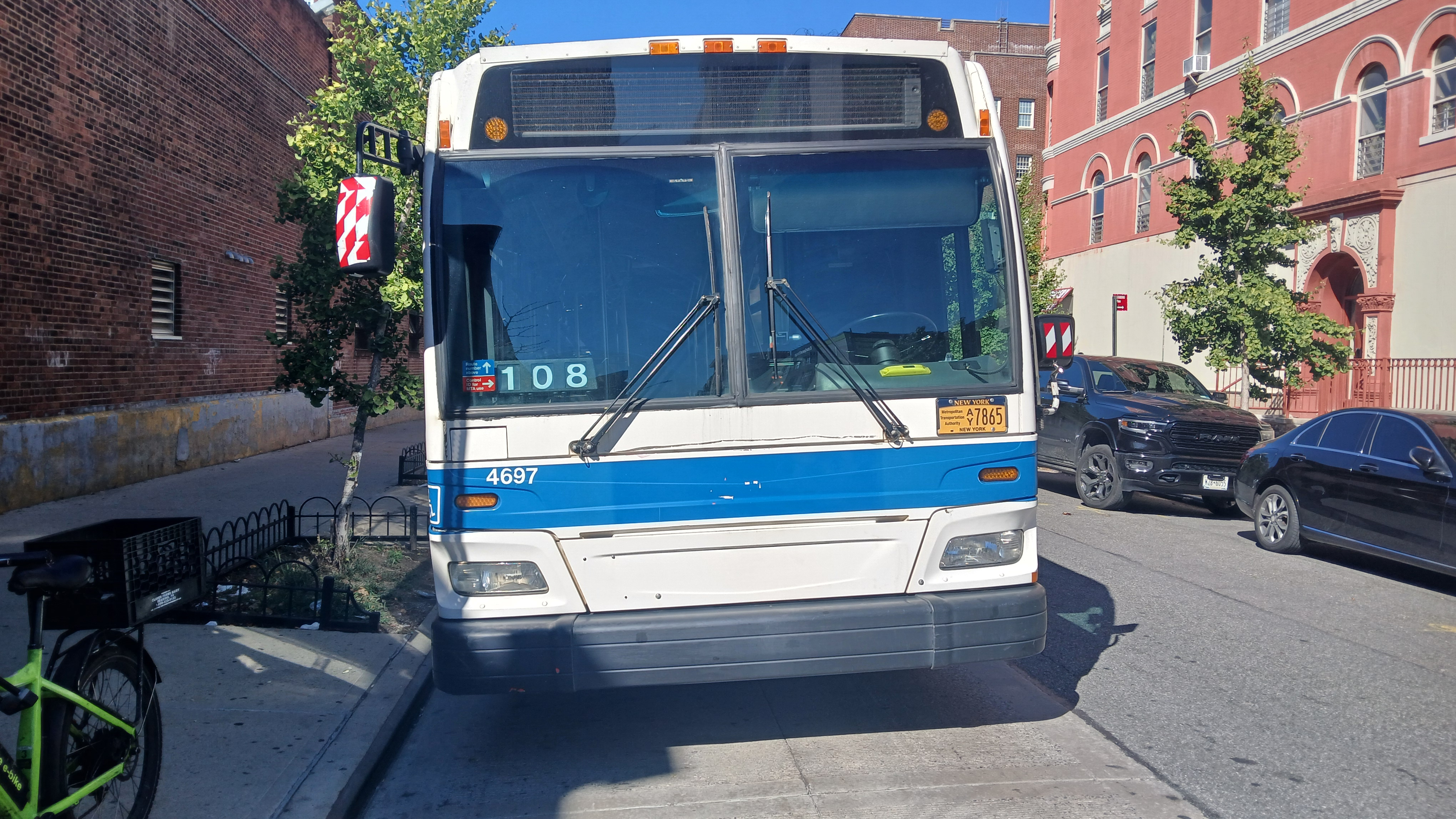
2010 Orion VII NG HEV operated by MTA

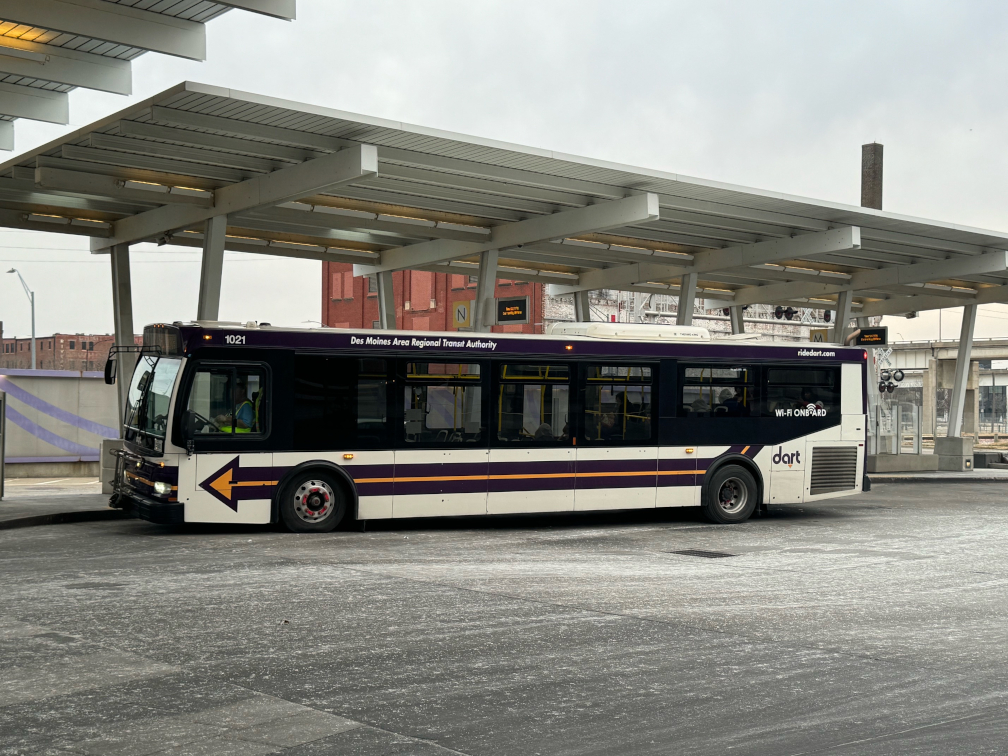
2011 Orion VII EPA10 operated by DART

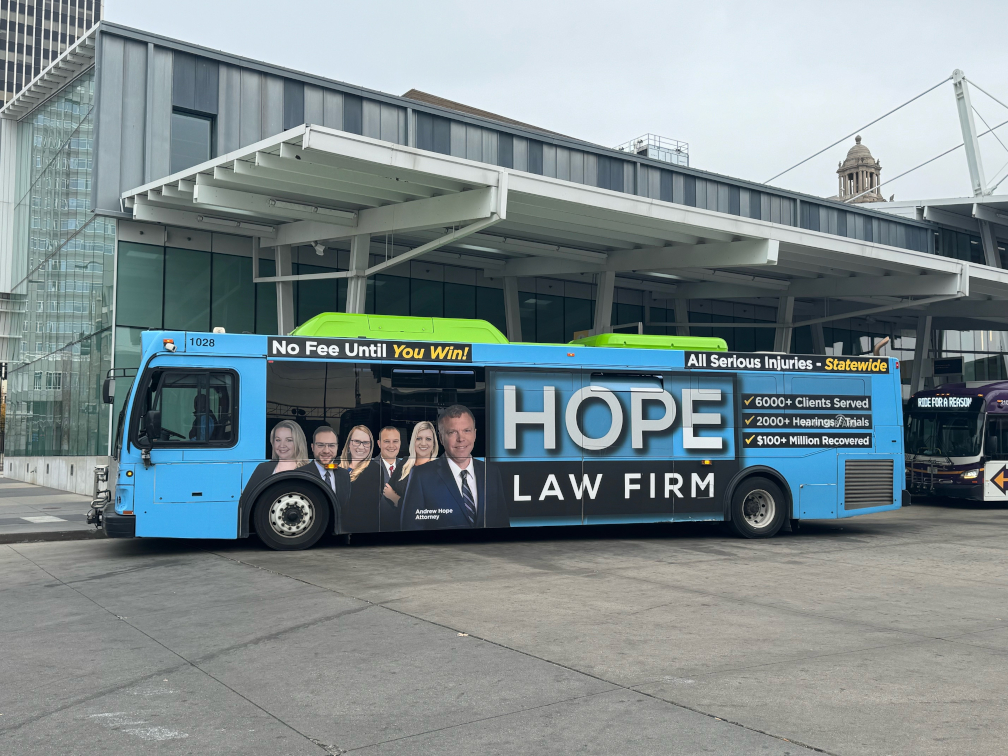
2011 Orion VII EPA10 HEV operated by DART

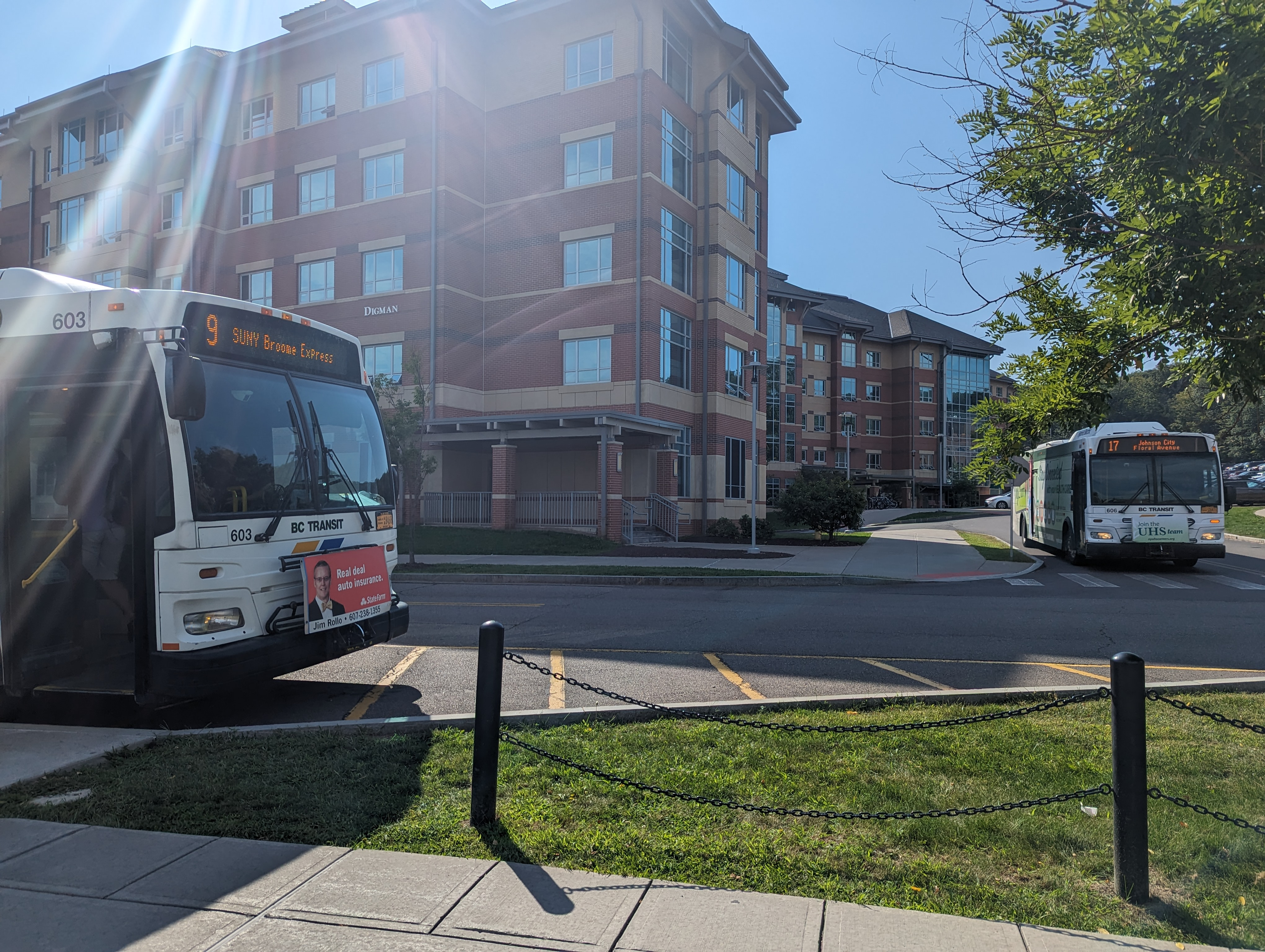
Two Broome County Transit Orion VII EPA10s at Binghamton University

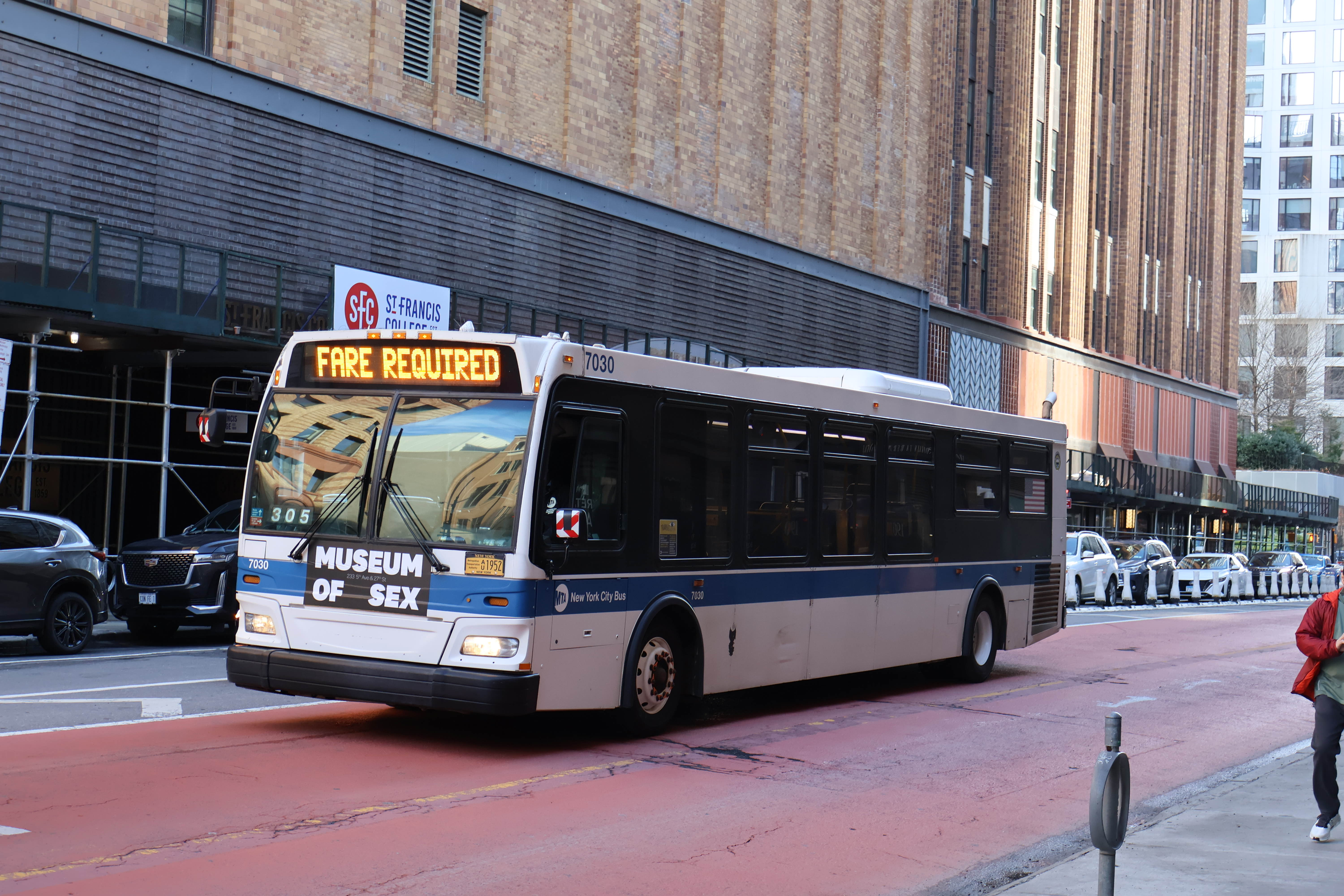
2011 Orion VII EPA10 operated by MTA

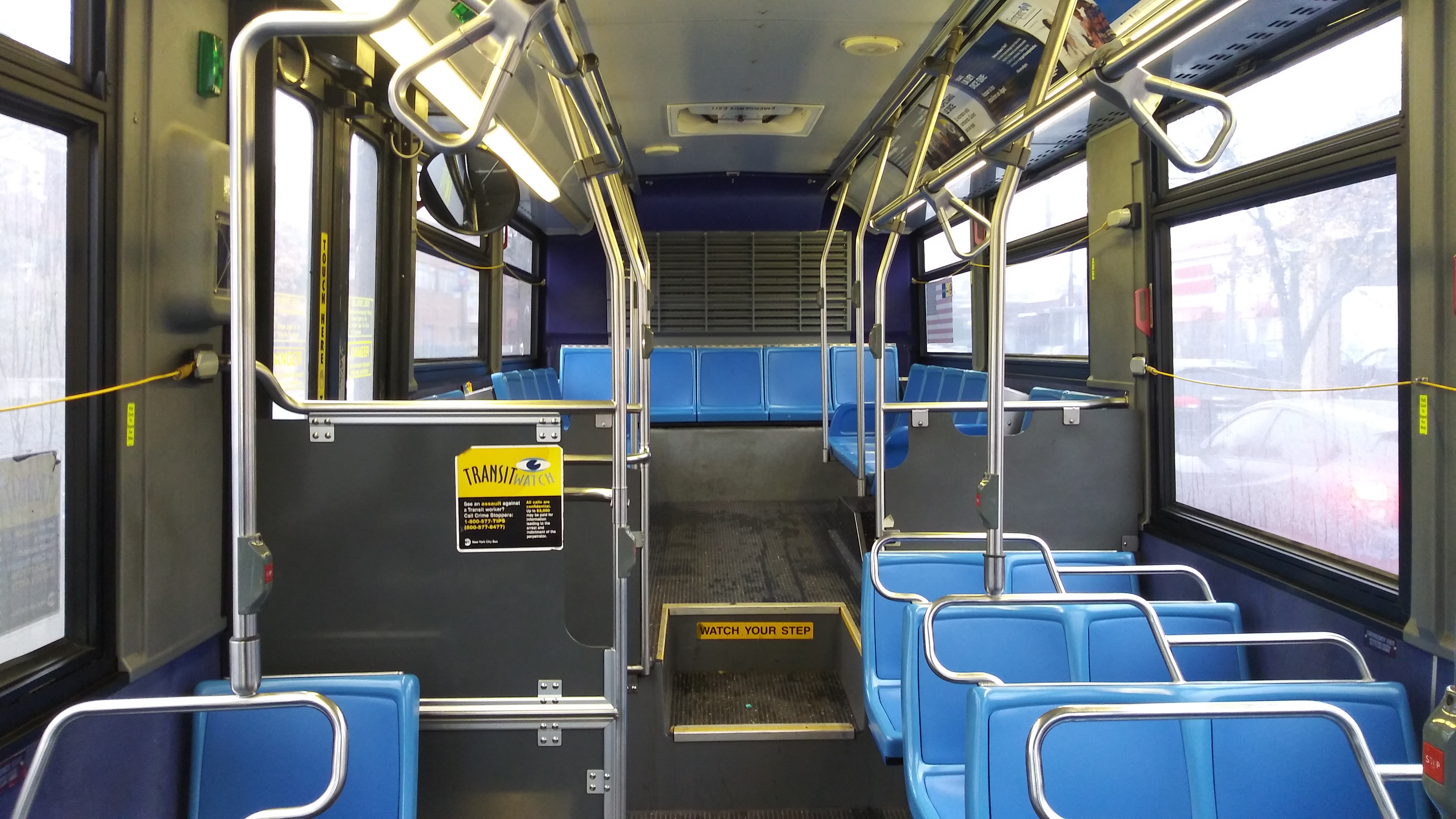
Interior of MTA New York City Bus Orion VII 2nd Generation

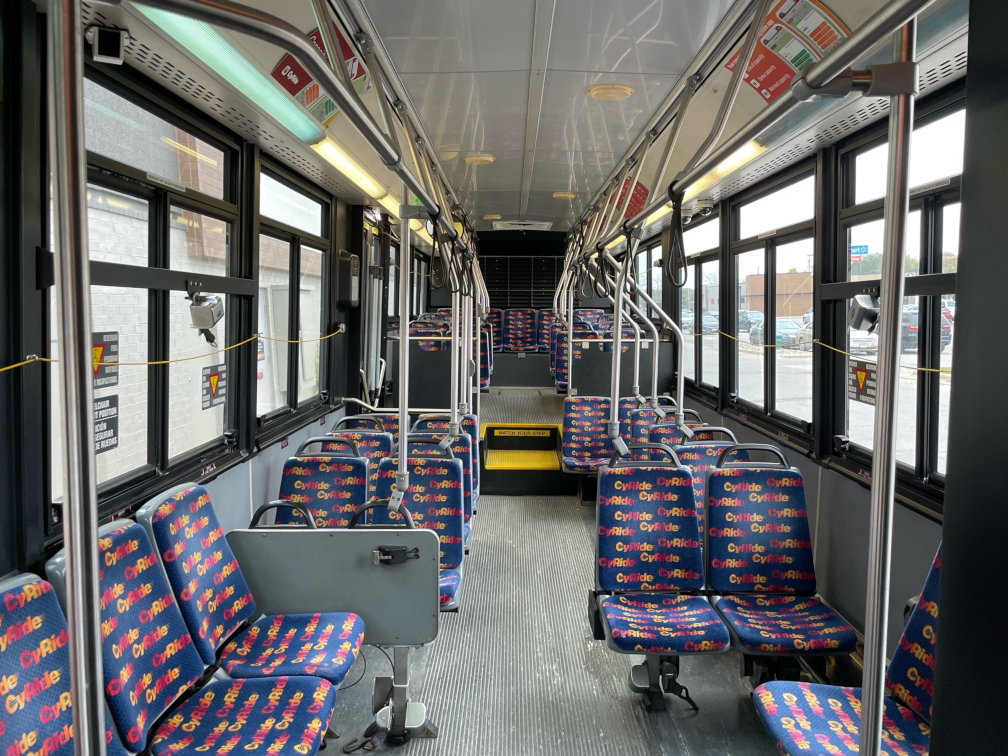
Interior of CyRide Orion VII

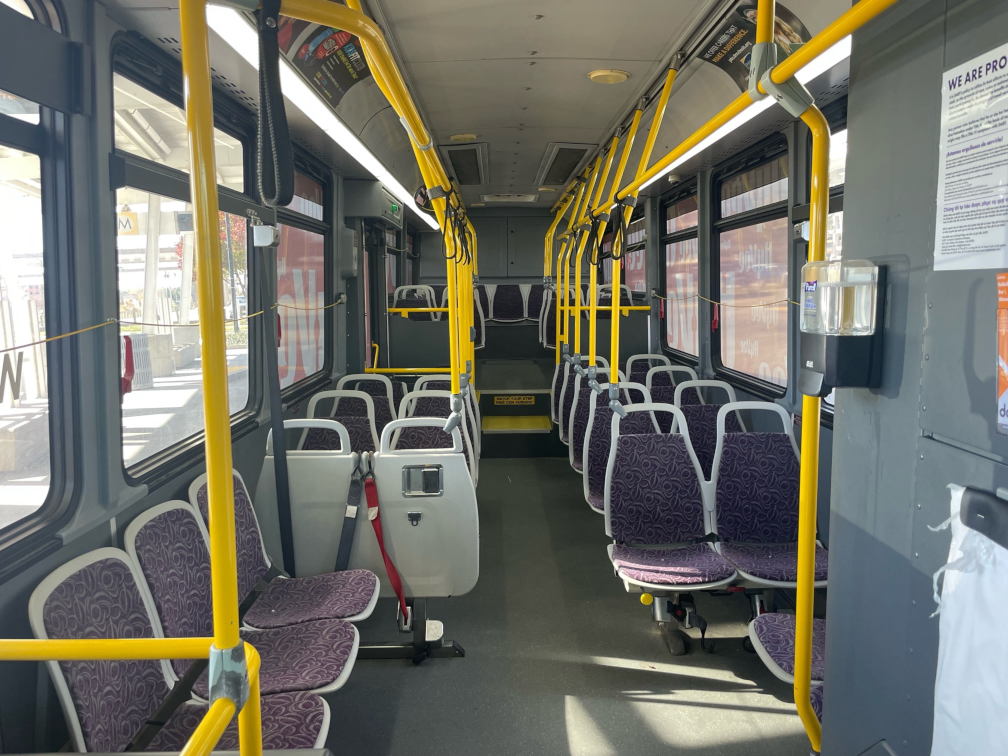
Interior of DART Orion VII EPA10

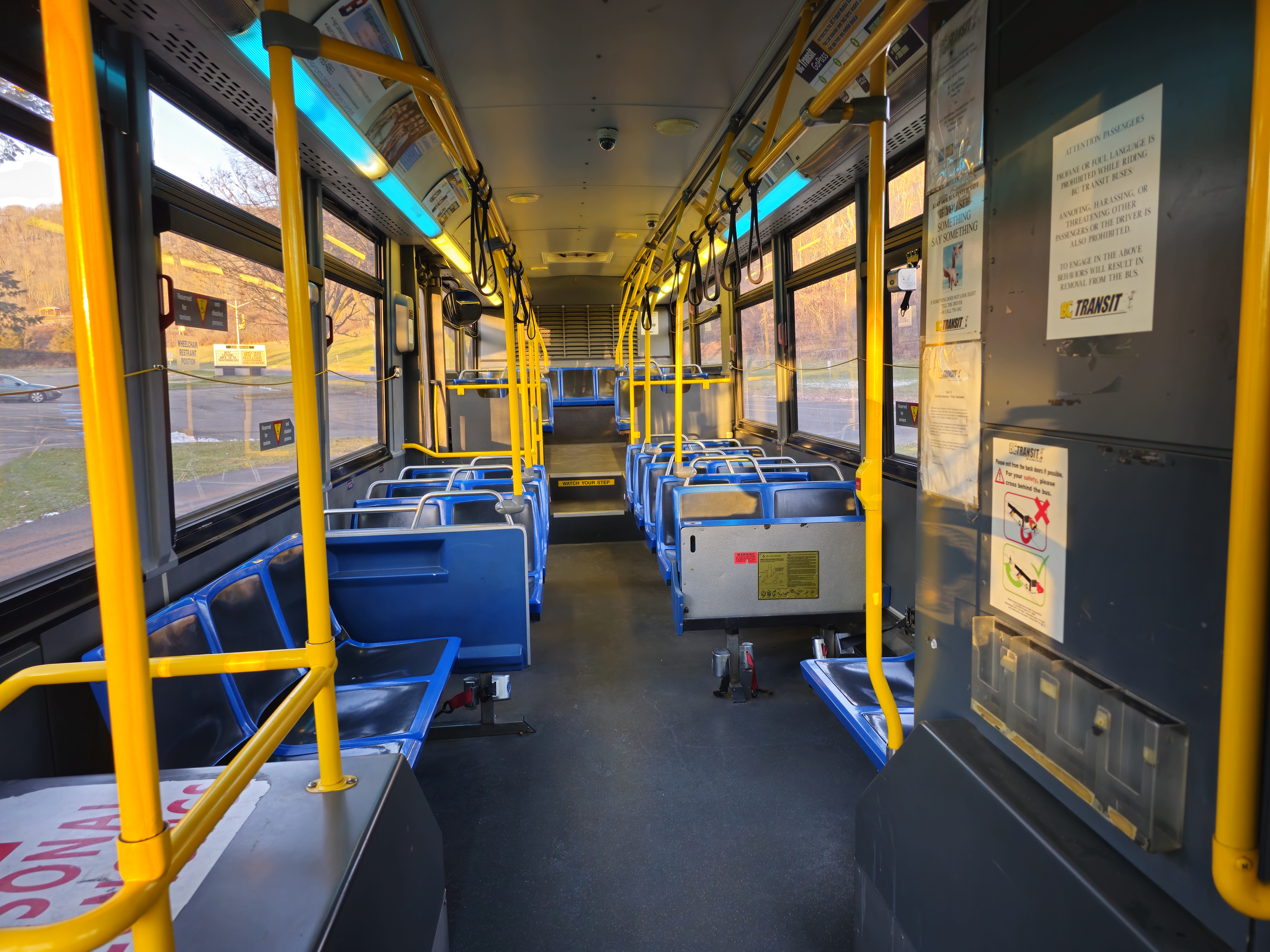
Interior of a Broome County Transit Orion VII Next Generation
