= Orion V =

Transit bus

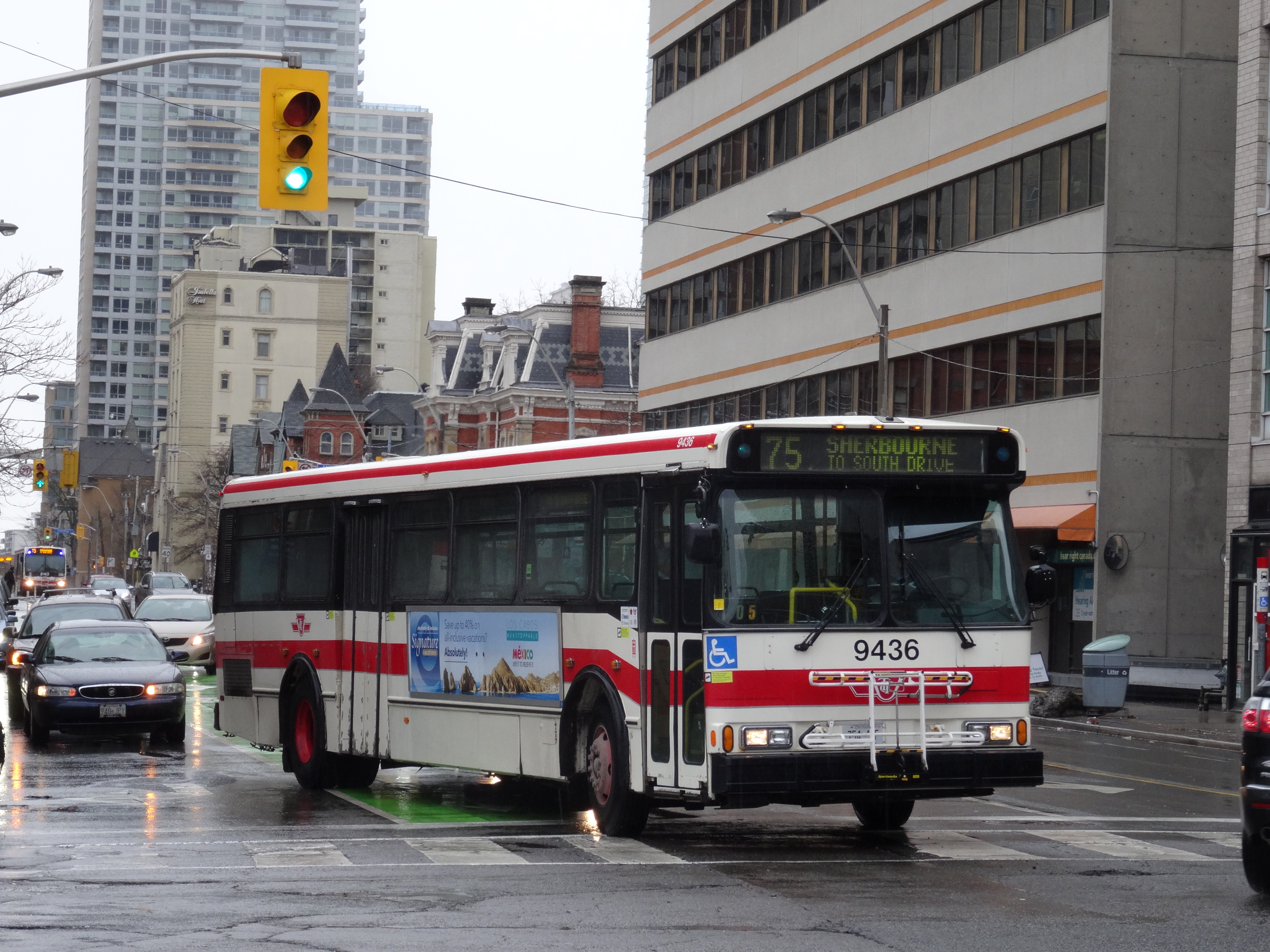
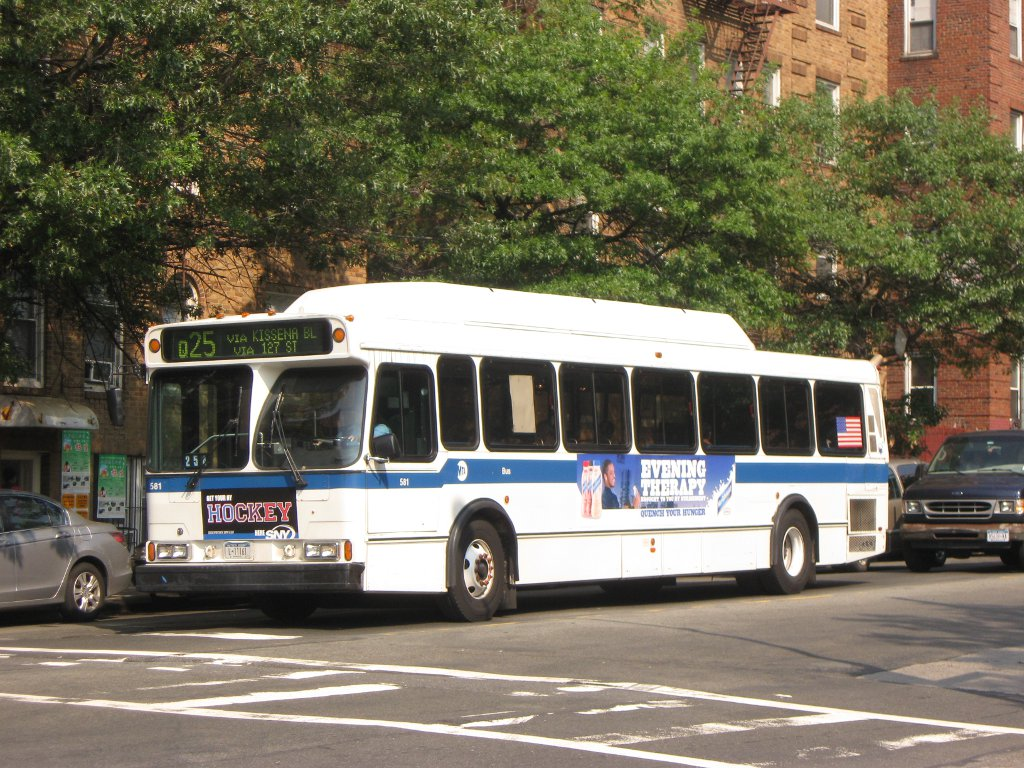
- Orion V buses operated by the Toronto Transit Commission, Everett Transit and the New York MTA; Top: Diesel (formerly CNG); Middle: CNG Bottom: Diesel

Overview
- Manufacturer: Daimler Buses North America (Orion Bus Industries)
- Production: 1989–2009
- Assembly: United States: Oriskany, New York; Canada: Mississauga, Ontario

Body and chassis
- Class: Transit bus
- Body style: Monocoque stressed skin
- Layout: RR

Powertrain
- Engine: Cummins ISL (diesel); Cummins C Gas Plus (CNG); Detroit Diesel S50/S50G (diesel/CNG)
- Transmission: Allison B400/B500; Voith D864; ZF HP592

Dimensions
- Wheelbase: 180 in (4.57 m) (32'); 219 in (5.56 m) (35'); 280 in (7.11 m) (40')
- Length: over bumpers: 32 ft 4.6 in (9.9 m) (32'); 35 ft 7.5 in (10.9 m) (35'); 40 ft 8.5 in (12.4 m) (40')
- Width: 96 in (2.44 m) [32' or 35'] or 102 in (2.59 m) [35' or 40']
- Height: 121 to 134 in (3.07 to 3.40 m)
- Curb weight: 25,500 to 28,800 lb (11,600 to 13,100 kg) (diesel); 26,150 to 31,700 lb (11,900 to 14,400 kg) (CNG)

Chronology
- Predecessor: Orion I
- Successor: Orion VI; Orion VII

The Orion V is a line of rigid high-floor transit buses available in 32', 35', and 40' lengths that was manufactured by Daimler Buses North America's subsidiary Orion Bus Industries.The conventionally powered buses, either with longitudinally mounted diesel or natural gas engines, used a T-drive transmission coupling.

Introduced in 1989 by Ontario Bus Industries, the Orion V replaced the Orion I, and was in turn replaced by the low-floor Orion VI (introduced in 1993) and Orion VII (introduced in 2001), although production continued until 2009.

== Design ==
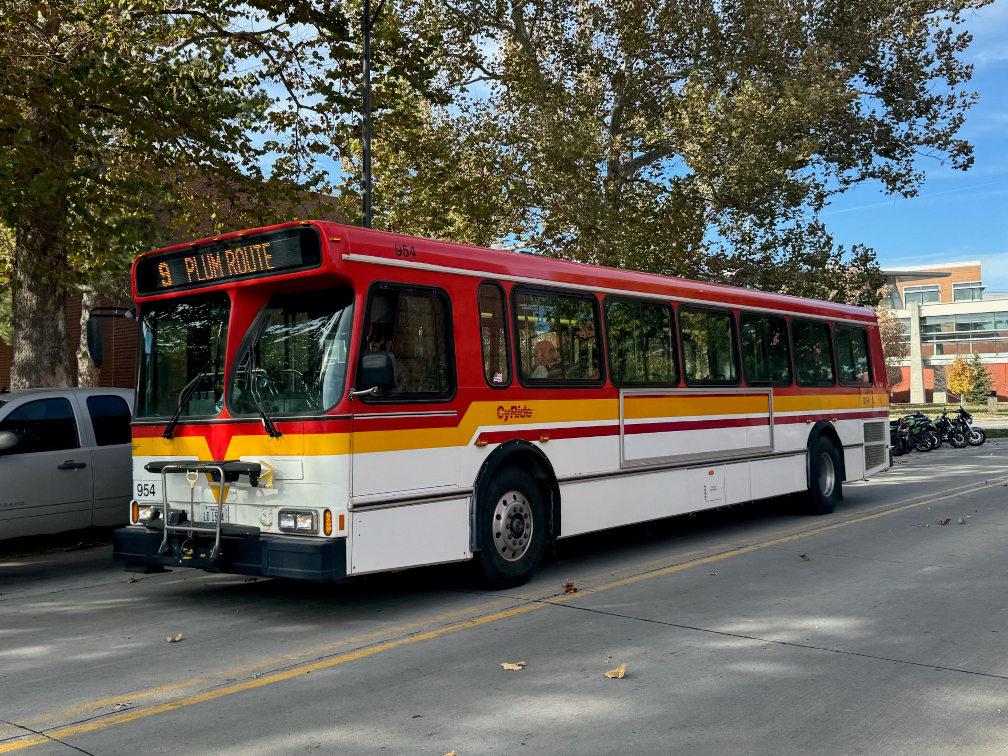
A 2000 Orion V (05.501) 40 foot bus operated by CyRide.

The two-piece windshield of the Orion V has the driver's windshield canted towards the back of the bus to reduce reflections. The bus was available in both transit (two-door) and suburban (single front door) configurations.

The Orion V uses a welded monocoque steel tube frame clad with steel and fiberglass panels, and an aluminum roof. The interior floor height is 35.75 inches (908 mm) except for the vestibule portion starting at the rear wheels, which is slightly lower at 34.5 inches (880 mm). The first step height is 14.5 inches (370 mm) for the front (11 inches (280 mm) when knelt) and 15.75 inches (400 mm) for the rear. All buses, regardless of fuel type, use longitudinally mounted engines with a T-drive transmission coupling driving the rear axle.

Compressed natural gas (CNG) buses carry their fuel on the roof in eight tanks, with a collective volume of 10,440 ft^{3} (296 m^{3}) at a pressure of 3,000 psi (21,000 kPa), measured at 70 °F (21 °C). Diesel buses were offered with 96, 125, or 150 US gal (360, 470, or 570 L) fuel tanks.

Ontario (later Orion) Bus Industries (OBI) marketed the Orion V to both the Canadian and United States transit markets. Canadian buses were assembled at the OBI plant in Mississauga, Ontario. For the US market, to meet 'Buy America' requirements for federally subsidized transit vehicles, the Orion V was assembled by wholly owned subsidiary Bus Industries of America (BIA) in Oriskany, New York.

=== Models ===
Internally, OBI designated the bus model as 05.50x, with x designating the model number.

Model number	Length	Width	Years available	Fuel type	Suburban or Transit
05.501	40 ft 8.5 in 12.41 m	102 in 2.59 m	1989-2009	Diesel and CNG	Both
05.502	40 ft 8.5 in 12.41 m	96 in 2.44 m	1989-2009	Diesel and CNG	Transit
05.503	35 ft 7.5 in 10.86 m	96 in 2.44 m	1989-2009	Diesel and CNG	Transit
05.504	35 ft 7.5 in 10.86 m	102 in 2.59 m	1989-2009	Diesel and CNG	Transit
05.505	32 ft 5 in 9.88 m	96 in 2.44 m	1989-2009	Diesel and CNG	Transit
05.506	32 ft 5 in 9.88 m	102 in 2.59 m	1989-2009	Diesel and CNG	Transit

=== Hybrid prototypes ===
A series hybrid bus was developed by the New York State Consortium using an Orion V 40' chassis equipped with powertrain components supplied by General Electric. This hybrid bus prototype used tandem rear axles driven by four traction motors, one for each wheel. Electric traction power was generated by a Cummins B5.9 diesel engine rated at 190 hp (140 kW) driving a 100 kW (130 hp) alternator, and energy from regenerative braking was stored in nickel-cadmium batteries.

== Deployment ==
The Orion V was OBI's most popular transit bus. The first production bus was sold to Mississauga Transit. Major transit agency users included New York City (MTA), Toronto (TTC), and Washington, D.C. (WMATA). For MTA, some buses in the final order from 1999 were unreliable and plagued with significant structural corrosion. Coast Mountain Bus Company in Vancouver operates the Orion V Suburban models built in 2008, the last buses built for a Canadian agency. The last Orion V models were built for Sonoma County Transit in 2008.

TTC retired its Orion V fleet in December 2015; the retirement event featured a final 40-minute ride on No. 9411.

As of 2026, a handful of Orion V models remain in operation. Beaver Bus Lines of Brandon, Manitoba currently operates a number of former GO Transit examples built from 2000 to 2004, With Everett Transit retiring their remaining 2001/2002 Orion V fleet in December 2024, the Bee-Line Bus System, CyRide, and Sonoma County Transit are currently the last operators of Orion V buses in the United States.

== Competition ==
- Flxible Metro
- Gillig Phantom
- NABI 416
- New Flyer High Floor
- Rapid Transit Series
