= Daimler Buses North America =

- Formerly: Thomas-Dennis (1999-2003); DaimlerChrysler Commercial Buses North America (2003–2007)
- Industry: Automotive
- Founded: 1999
- Founder: Thomas Built Buses; Dennis
- Defunct: 2021
- Headquarters: Greensboro, North Carolina, United States
- Products: Buses
- Parent: Daimler Truck

Daimler Buses North America (DBNA) was Daimler's North America bus division, incorporating the Orion, Setra, and Dodge Sprinter brands. Due to the spinoff of Daimler's truck division on December 1, 2021, it merged into Daimler Truck North America.

== History ==
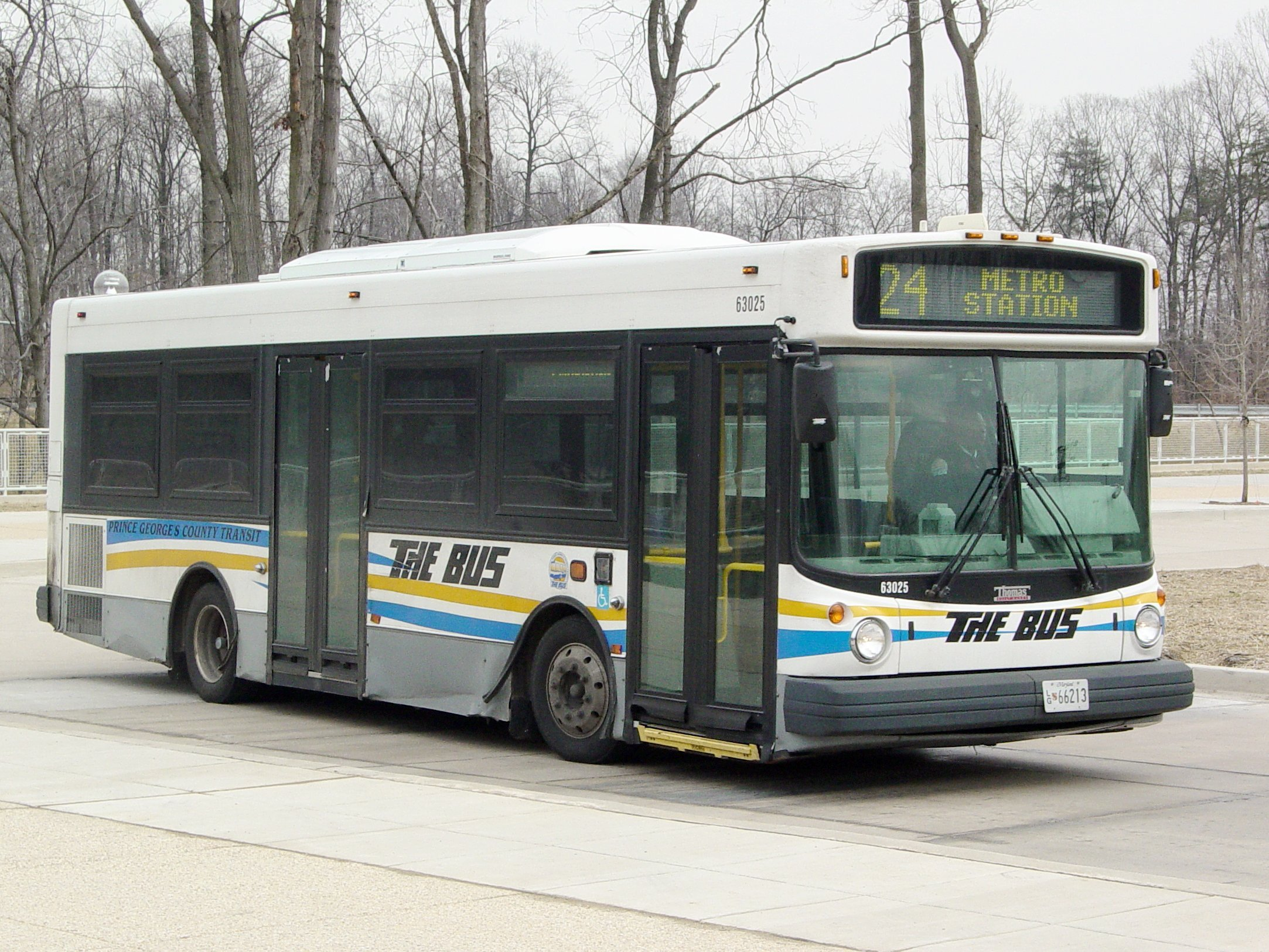
A The Bus Thomas Dennis SLF200 at Morgan Boulevard station in March 2005

In 1999, Thomas Dennis was formed as a joint venture between Thomas Built Buses of the United States (51%) and Dennis of England (49%).

It manufactured a version of the Dennis Dart, engineered for the North American market, in a new facility located in Greensboro, North Carolina. The SLF200 was reengineered in 2002 to use a Mercedes-Benz engine and electrics. Dennis had hoped to develop a 40 ft transit bus, but instead DaimlerChrysler subsequently bought Orion Bus Industries. As a result, Mayflower terminated the joint venture, selling its 49 per cent interest to partner DaimlerChrysler. Mayflower stated it wanted to concentrate on double-deckers, citing the success of their double-decker fleets in New York and Vancouver.

Thomas Dennis was renamed DaimlerChrysler Commercial Buses North America in 2003.

In 2007 the company changed its name from DaimlerChrysler Commercial Buses North America to Daimler Buses North America after Daimler-Benz and Chrysler Corporation Demerged and parted ways when Daimler-Benz sold the Chrysler Corporation to Cerberus Capital Management.

== Models ==
- SLF200-series (SLF229, SLF232, SLF235) - Powered by diesel or compressed natural gas, discontinued in 2005
- CL100 cutaway bus
- Sprinter
- Setra S and SG series
- Orion V
- Orion VI
- Orion VII
