= Orion Bus Industries =

Bus manufacturer based in Ontario, Canada (1975-2013)

Orion International
- The final logo of Orion used from 2007 to 2013.
- Formerly: Ontario Bus and Truck, Inc. (1975–1977); Ontario Bus Industries (1977–1995); Orion Bus Industries (1995–2009)
- Type: Subsidiary
- Industry: Bus manufacturing
- Founded: 1975; 51 years ago (Ontario Bus and Truck); 1981; 45 years ago (Bus Industries of America)
- Defunct: 2013; 13 years ago
- Fate: Voluntary closure/market exit
- Headquarters: Mississauga, Ontario, Canada
- Area served: Canada, United States
- Key people: Rich Ferguson (CEO)
- Products: Transit buses
- Owner: Arnold Wollschlaeger (1975–1979); Don Sheardown (1979–1994); Government of Ontario (1994–1995); Western Star Trucks (1995–2000); Daimler AG (2000–2013); New Flyer (2013–present; aftermarket business only)
- Number of employees: 1,400 (US and Canada)
- Parent: New Flyer (aftermarket business only)
- Subsidiaries: Bus Industries of America (1981–1995)
- Website: orionbus.com/orion (archived link)

Orion International was a North American bus manufacturer based in Mississauga, Ontario, Canada. The company had its main manufacturing plant in Mississauga and sent bus body shells to their plant in Oriskany, New York, for final assembly and testing of vehicles destined for U.S. markets.

The company was founded by Arnold Wollschlaeger in 1974 as Ontario Bus and Truck Incorporated, who introduced the Orion bus to market in 1976. The company was renamed Ontario Bus Industries (OBI) in 1977. It expanded operations to the United States in 1981, founding a wholly owned subsidiary named Bus Industries of America. At its peak OBI employed over 1,200 workers in the Mississauga plant.

After falling into arrears on loans provided by the Government of Ontario, the government took over operation of the company in 1994. Subsequently it was sold to Western Star Truck Holdings in 1995, which consolidated the names of OBI and its Bus Industries of America subsidiary to Orion Bus Industries. In 2000, Western Star was purchased by a division of DaimlerChrysler, and in 2006, Orion was absorbed into DaimlerChrysler Commercial Buses North America. DaimlerChrysler continued to market its buses under the "Orion" brand name, and Orion Bus Industries was renamed Orion International in 2009.

In April 2012, Daimler announced the closure of Orion, with bus production halted in 2013.

== Corporate history ==
The company was founded in Mississauga in 1975 as Ontario Bus and Truck, Inc., a private company led by Arnold Wollschlaeger. It was renamed Ontario Bus Industries (OBI) in 1977 and introduced its first prototype bus in 1978, under the model name Orion I. Don Sheardown purchased the company from Wollschlaeger's estate in 1979. A U.S. subsidiary named Bus Industries of America, wholly owned by Ontario Bus Industries, was incorporated in 1981 in Oriskany, New York, to serve the U.S. market. Subsequent models built by OBI or BIA continued to use the "Orion" brand name, with the Orion II being introduced in 1983 as the first low-floor heavy duty bus and the prototype Orion VI, the company's first low-floor bus, being produced in 1993.

At its height in the early 1990s, Ontario Bus Industries employed 1,200 at its Mississauga and Oriskany plants, producing 750 vehicles to 38 transit agencies in the US alone. OBI was taken over by the Ontario Government in 1994 for loan arrears; by that time, the Mississauga plant only had 165 employees. The $81 million investment, which consisted of forgiving $66M in loans and an additional $15M investment, was criticized by Monte Kwinter as "a total disaster". It was sold in 1995 to Western Star Truck Holdings of Kelowna for $35M, which also acquired OBI subsidiary Bus Industries of America, and Western Star adopted a new, single name for both companies, Orion Bus Industries.

In July 2000, parent company Western Star Trucks was acquired by Freightliner, a division of DaimlerChrysler (now Mercedes-Benz Group), and became part of the group Daimler Buses North America. In 2006, Orion Bus Industries became part of the DaimlerChrysler Commercial Buses North America as a subsidiary of Daimler. It continued to market its buses under the "Orion" brand name.

In September 2007, employees representing the United Auto Workers in the Orion plant in Oriskany went on strike for three weeks.

On April 25, 2012, the company announced it would stop taking orders for new buses, and the Mississauga and Oriskany plants would close once outstanding orders were fulfilled. The closure took union officials by surprise; CAW had just signed a one-year extension on April 1 for the Mississauga plant. It was announced that more than 530 workers would be laid off in the Mississauga and Oriskany plants. A Wildcat strike happened in May 2012. New Flyer assumed some outstanding orders with Orion for New York City Transit and King County Metro.

The Oriskany plant was initially retained for aftermarket parts and support for Orion bus operators, until New Flyer acquired that business from Daimler Buses in 2013. The New York location also performed repairs, including a retrofit program with BAE Systems for recalled hybrid-electric buses using BAE's HybriDrive system, until it was refitted as an assembly facility for New Flyer buses.

The sales and closures were part of the closure of Daimler Buses North America; only Daimler's imported Setra buses continued to be marketed in North America although distribution rights were taken over by Motor Coach Industries (MCI) in exchange for a minority stake in MCI. MCI itself was purchased by New Flyer in 2015, and the Setra distribution rights lasted until January 2018, when the REV Group took over distribution. Setra became part of the newly renamed Daimler Coaches North America in January 2020 when Daimler once again distributed Setra coaches.

== Product lineup ==
Orion manufactured a number of different models of buses over its 37-year existence. A list of models is given below; each increasing number is the next generation model.

Most buses today in service are of the Orion V or VII models. Orion also marketed the Thomas Dennis SLF 200 mid-sized bus.

Model		Length & Width	Picture	Produced	Fuel type	Refs
Orion I		31 ft (9.45 m) • 96 in (2.44 m); 35 ft (10.67 m) • 96 in (2.44 m); 37 ft (11.28 m) • 96 in (2.44 m); 40 ft (12.19 m) • 96 in (2.44 m)		1977–1993	Diesel; Compressed natural gas	
Orion II		21.92 ft (6.68 m) • 96 in (2.44 m); 25.92 ft (7.90 m) • 96 in (2.44 m)		1983–2003	Diesel; Compressed natural gas	
Orion III Orion-Ikarus 286 (Note: Bodies and chassis made by Ikarus to form the Ikarus 286 model, marketed as the Orion-Ikarus in Canada. Ikarus 286 also marketed in the United States as the Crown-Ikarus 286.)		60 ft (18.29 m) • 102 in (2.59 m)	An Orion-Ikarus (Orion III) on display at Expo 86	1984–1989	Diesel	
Orion IV		Tractor: 37.5 ft (11.43 m) • 98.75 in (2.51 m); Trailer: 35.5 ft (10.82 m) • 98.75 in (2.51 m)		1985–1989	Liquefied petroleum gas	
Orion V		32 ft (9.75 m) • 96 in (2.44 m); 35 ft (10.67 m) • 96 in (2.44 m); 35 ft (10.67 m) • 102 in (2.59 m); 40 ft (12.19 m) • 96 in (2.44 m); 40 ft (12.19 m) • 102 in (2.59 m)		1989–2009	Diesel; Compressed natural gas	
Orion VI		40 ft (12.19 m) • 102 in (2.59 m)		1995–2004	Diesel; Compressed natural gas; Diesel-electric hybrid	
Orion VII	OG	32.5 ft (9.91 m) • 102 in (2.59 m); 35 ft (10.67 m) • 102 in (2.59 m); 40.5 ft (12.34 m) • 102 in (2.59 m)		2001–2007	Diesel; Compressed natural gas; Diesel-electric hybrid	
Orion VII	NG	32.5 ft (9.91 m) • 102 in (2.59 m); 35 ft (10.67 m) • 102 in (2.59 m); 40.5 ft (12.34 m) • 102 in (2.59 m)		2007–2011	Diesel; Compressed natural gas; Diesel-electric hybrid	
Orion VII	EPA10 (3G)	32.5 ft (9.91 m) • 102 in (2.59 m); 35 ft (10.67 m) • 102 in (2.59 m); 40.5 ft (12.34 m) • 102 in (2.59 m)		2010-2013	Diesel; Compressed natural gas; Diesel-electric hybrid	

== See also ==
- Crown-Ikarus 286, similar to the Orion-Ikarus III bus
