= Orion VI =

Low-floor transit bus

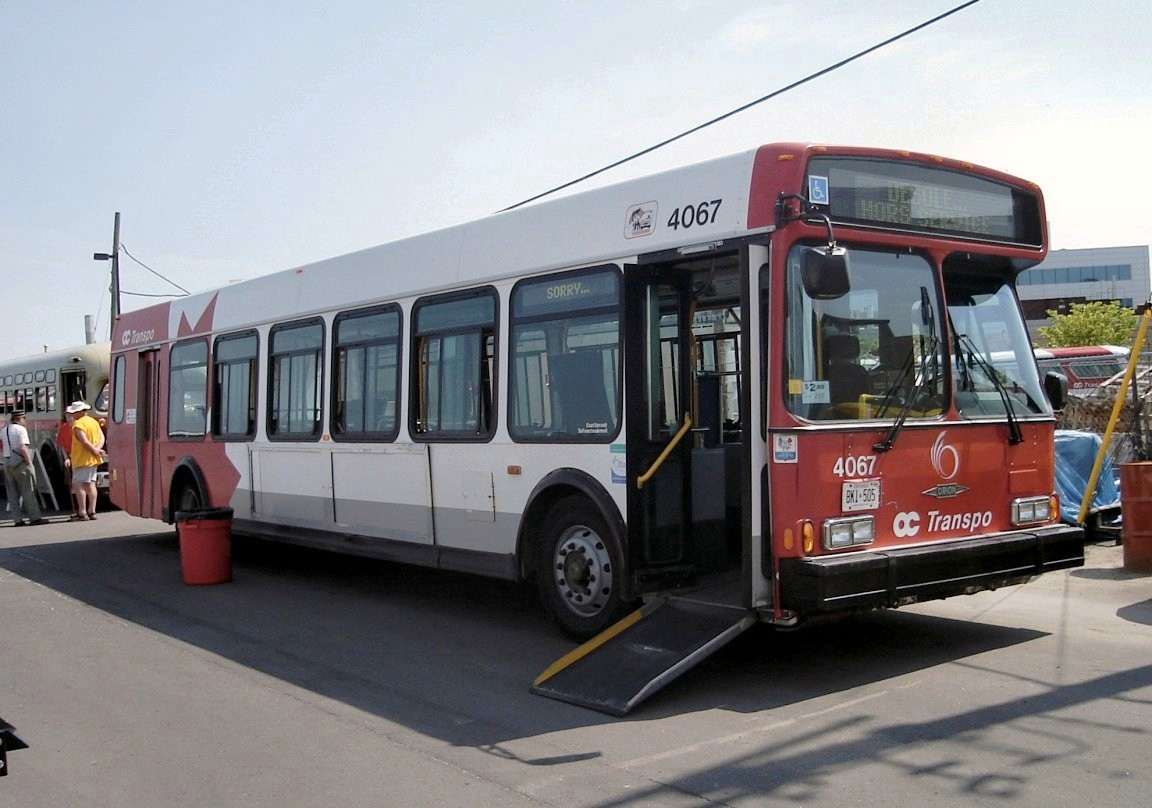
- OC Transpo Orion VI bus (2006)

Overview
- Manufacturer: Orion Bus Industries
- Production: 1995–2003
- Assembly: United States: Oriskany, New York; Canada: Mississauga, Ontario

Body and chassis
- Class: Transit bus
- Body style: Semi-monocoque
- Layout: RR (offset)

Powertrain
- Engine: Cummins M11 (diesel); Cummins L10G (CNG); Detroit Diesel S50/S50G (diesel/CNG)
- Transmission: Allison B400/B500; Voith D864; ZF HP592

Dimensions
- Wheelbase: 277.1 in (7.04 m)
- Length: over bumpers: 40 ft 8 in (12.4 m)
- Width: 102 in (2.59 m)
- Height: 123 in (3.12 m)
- Curb weight: 25,500 to 28,800 lb (11,600 to 13,100 kg) (diesel)

Chronology
- Predecessor: Orion V
- Successor: Orion VII

The Orion VI is a 40-foot low-floor transit bus manufactured by Ontario Bus Industries (renamed Orion Bus Industries in 1995) between 1995 and 2003. The Orion VI was intended to provide an alternative to the existing high-floor Orion V; both the V and VI were replaced by the partially low-floor Orion VII (introduced in 2001).

Unlike competing low-floor buses, which package the drivetrain components in an rear underfloor compartment, resulting in a step and raised floor near the rear axle, the Orion VI had its drivetrain in a compartment occupying the rear corner of the bus, with the low floor extending all the way back to the rear of the bus. In addition, the Orion VI was the first North American bus to be offered with a hybrid powertrain option, in 1998.

== Design ==
Orion Bus Industries (OBI) introduced the Orion VI at the American Public Transit Association Expo in 1993. The two-piece windshield of the Orion VI, similar to the design of the Orion V and first-generation Orion VII, has the driver's windshield canted towards the back of the bus to reduce reflections. The bus was offered with up to three side doors, and with a choice of Diesel or compressed natural gas (CNG) engines. The engine compartment of the Orion VI completely occupies the rear corner on the driver's side of the bus.

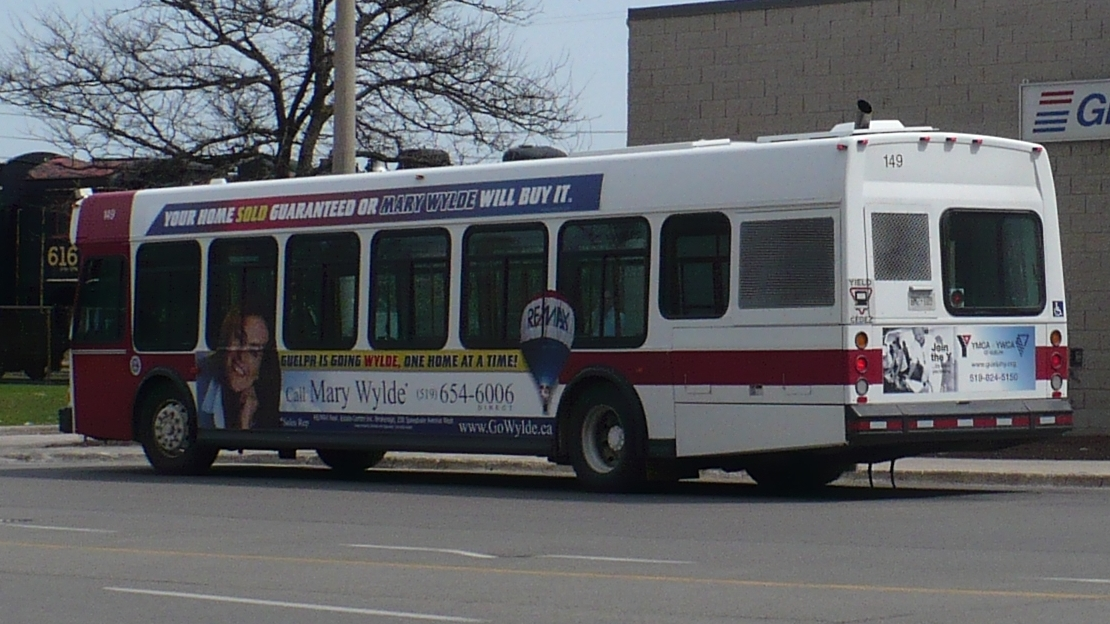
Side view of Orion VI in Guelph; the engine compartment is in the rear driver's-side corner of the bus.

The layout of a typical North American low-floor transit bus has the low floor over most of the interior, extending from the front door to the rear door; behind the rear door, steps lead up to an elevated section to provide clearance for the engine and rear axle. The Orion VI offered a "true" or "full" low-floor, in which the low floor covers the entire length. Although the bus offered more overall capacity (including standees) than the competing New Flyer D40LF, which used the typical partial low-floor layout, the D40LF had approximately 10% more seats, as the Orion VI offered very few seats behind the rear axle. In a study performed by New York City Transit, the Orion VI had the fewest seats (28) compared with a New Flyer D40LF (39) and a conventional RTS bus (40); despite the ease of entry and exit, customers felt the low-floor bus had the least room and preferred the RTS.

The Orion VI uses a welded semi-monocoque steel frame clad with aluminum and fiberglass panels. The interior floor height is 15.5 inches (390 mm), corresponding to the first step height of the front door (11 inches (280 mm) when knelt) and 14.8 inches (380 mm) for the rear step height. To facilitate the full low-floor design, the suspension features an independent front design using MacPherson struts and an inverted rear portal axle.

OBI marketed the Orion VI to both the Canadian and United States transit markets. Canadian buses were assembled at the OBI plant in Mississauga, Ontario. For the US market, to meet 'Buy America' requirements for federally subsidized transit vehicles, the Orion VI was partially assembled at Mississauga, then shipped to Oriskany, New York for final assembly by wholly owned subsidiary Bus Industries of America (BIA).

Internally, OBI designated the bus model as 06.501.

=== Hybrid ===
A prototype series hybrid bus was developed by the New York State Consortium using an Orion V 40' chassis equipped with powertrain components supplied by General Electric. This hybrid bus prototype used tandem rear axles driven by four traction motors, one for each wheel. Electric traction power was generated by a Cummins B5.9 diesel engine rated at 190 hp (140 kW) driving a 100 kW (130 hp) alternator, and energy from regenerative braking was stored in nickel-cadmium batteries.

In 1998, the Orion VI became the first North American transit bus to be offered with a hybrid powertrain as a regular production option. The New York City (NYC) Metropolitan Transportation Authority was the lead customer, with an order of 125 Orion VI Hybrid buses planned for delivery in 2002. The series hybrid powertrain, developed from the Orion V prototype by Lockheed Martin and marketed as HybriDrive™, differed in adopting a single rear axle driven by one traction motor, storing energy in lead-acid batteries, and using a Detroit Diesel Series 30 (a co-branded Navistar T444E) V-8 diesel engine turning a generator. A pilot fleet of 10 Orion VI Hybrid buses was sold in 1998 to MTA for $5.6 million.

During durability testing at Altoona, Pennsylvania, the roof-mounted battery packs failed shortly after the bus was received, resulting in a prolonged unavailability of more than 1000 hours, and the traction motor failed three times.

== Deployment ==
The Orion VI was mostly sold in Canada. Major transit agency users included New York City (MTA), Ottawa (OC Transpo) and Toronto (TTC).

TTC retired its Orion VI fleet in 2006 after less than ten years of service. The Orion VI for TTC had been purchased with CNG engines, and rather than convert them to diesel (as it was doing with the preceding Orion V fleet), TTC opted to retire the buses.

Several Orion VI buses caught fire (WMATA, 2012; LACMTA, 2018) resulting in the idling of the entire Orion VI fleet for those transit agencies. The United States National Highway Traffic Safety Administration also received separate complaints of tires catching fire in Arlington Heights, Illinois (2004) and Birmingham, Alabama (2005). In addition, a loose hydraulic pump fitting resulted in an engine fire for WMATA in 2010.

As of 2026, Copper Mountain Transportation in Summit County, Colorado operated three-door units. Cornwall Transit retired the last Canadian units in early-2022; they were previously 1997-built MiWay units acquired from Eastway Refurbishing in 2013 and 2016.

== Competition ==
- Gillig Low Floor
- NABI LFW
- New Flyer Low Floor
- Nova Bus LFS
