= Detroit Diesel Series 50 =

Overview
- Manufacturer: Detroit Diesel (cylinder heads cast by John Deere)
- Also called: Series 50, Series 50 EGR, Series 50G, Series 50 MK-G
- Production: 1994–2005 (currently still available for off-road vehicles)

Layout
- Configuration: Straight-four 4 stroke diesel engine
- Displacement: 519 cu in (8.50 L)
- Cylinder bore: 5.12 in (130 mm)
- Piston stroke: 6.30 in (160 mm)
- Cylinder block material: Cast iron
- Cylinder head material: Cast iron

Combustion
- Turbocharger: Wastegated, Variable geometry turbocharger
- Fuel type: Diesel, CNG, LNG

Dimensions
- Length: 42.9 in (1,090 mm)
- Width: 44.2 in (1,123 mm)
- Height: 47.5 in (1,206 mm)
- Dry weight: 2,230 lb (1,012 kg)

Chronology
- Predecessor: Series 60 Series 92
- Successor: Daimler Heavy-Duty Engine Platform (Series 13, 15 & 16)

The Detroit Diesel Series 50 is an inline four-cylinder diesel engine, that was introduced in 1993 by Detroit Diesel. The Series 50 was developed from the existing block of its sister engine, the Series 60, which itself was initially designed by Detroit Diesel. The cylinder heads were cast by John Deere at one time.

== History ==
The Series 50 engine is used as a major bus engine in North America, especially from buses built in the mid to late 1990s and early 2000s. The power plant was offered for several applications: trucks, buses, motor homes, construction and industrial equipment, and military vehicles. It is unusual to find an inline four-cylinder engine propelling heavy duty buses, which traditionally use inline-six, V6 or V8 diesel engines.

In 2000, in order to better respond to more stringent EPA emissions standards, Detroit Diesel announced revisions of the Series 50 for diesel applications. The changes included the addition of an exhaust gas recirculation (EGR) system, and a variable geometry turbocharger system to improve torque.

In September 2004, Detroit Diesel ceased production of the Series 50 heavy duty diesel engine for on highway applications due to emissions standards. It is still available for off-road applications. A replacement was scheduled to take place in 2007, then was pushed back until 2009. According to Detroit Diesel, Series 50 engines will no longer be produced for non-Daimler AG trucks or buses beginning in 2010.

=== Alternative fuels ===
In addition to being powered by diesel fuel, the engine can also use alternative fuels such as compressed natural gas (CNG) or liquified natural gas (LNG) under the Series 50G label. Several thousand Series 50 propelled buses were once on the streets of major cities such as New York City and Los Angeles.

== Design ==
=== Features ===
- Power ratings ranging from 250 to 350 hp (190 to 260 kW)
- Supports the DDEC III and DDEC IV
- Since 2001 the engines included an EGR device.
- Twin balance shafts
- Single over head camshaft design
- Electronic Unit Injection

=== Popular horsepower ratings ===
- 725 ft⋅lbf (983 N⋅m) @ 1200 rpm, 250 hp govern at 2100 rpm
- 890 ft⋅lbf (1,210 N⋅m) @ 1200 rpm, 275 hp govern at 2100 rpm
- 1,150 ft⋅lbf (1,560 N⋅m) @ 1200 rpm, 320 hp govern at 2100 rpm

== Competing power plants ==
- Caterpillar 3208
- Caterpillar C9
- Cummins 6CTA / Westport 8.3-L
- Cummins L10 / ISL
- Cummins M11 / ISM
- Detroit Diesel 6V92
- International DT466
- Perkins 1104C 4.4-L
