= Oriskany, New York =

- Village
- Location in Oneida County and the state of New York.
- Coordinates: 43°9.4′N 75°19.9′W
- Country: United States
- State: New York
- Region: Central New York
- County: Oneida

Government
  - Mayor: Clifford "Mick" O'Connor, Jr.

Area
  - Total: 0.79 sq mi (2.05 km^{2})
  - Land: 0.79 sq mi (2.05 km^{2})
  - Water: 0 sq mi (0.00 km^{2})
- Elevation: 430 ft (131 m)

Population (2020)
  - Total: 1,315
  - Density: 1,661.2/sq mi (641.39/km^{2})
- Time zone: UTC-5 (Eastern (EST))
  - Summer (DST): UTC-4 (EDT)
- ZIP code: 13424
- Area code: 315
- FIPS code: 36-55365
- GNIS feature ID: 0959480
- Website: www.oriskany.gov

Oriskany (/ɔːrˈɪskəni/ or /əˈrɪskəni/) is a village in Oneida County, New York, United States. The population was 1,315 at the 2020 census. The name is derived from a Haudenosaunee word for "nettles".

The village of Oriskany is in the town of Whitestown, southeast of Rome; NY-69 passes through the village, which is south of the Erie Canal.

== History ==
The Oneida village of Oriska was established at the confluence of the Oriskany Creek and the Mohawk River before 1766. Oriska, sometimes also spelled as Ockrisk, Oriska, or Oriske, is believed to be a linguistic corruption of "Ol Hiskè" meaning "a place of nettles."

On August 5, 1777, during the American Revolution, Oriska was visited by the Tryon County militia led by Brigadier General Nicholas Herkimer. The American-aligned militia was en route to Fort Stanwix to help lift a siege by allied British forces. Several dozen to one hundred Oneida joined Herkimer's militia for the trip.

On the morning of August 6, 1777, the forces left Oriska for Fort Stanwix but were met by an ambush about three miles outside of Oriska. The location today is marked by the Oriskany Battlefield State Historic Site.

The Tory Mohawk who allied with the British later retaliated against Oriska, destroying "stock and provisions" of the village's residents.

Records of the village for the remainder of the war remain sparse. In a letter dated November 30, 1778, Major General Philip Schuyler implores General Washington that "for the Support of the Communication and Security of Convoys" between Albany and Oswego "Another post to be Occupied by a like number [of 50 men] should be Established At or near Oriska," among seven other sites.Founders Online: To George Washington from Major General Philip Schuyler, 30 No …

In June 1785, the area was surveyed by G. Lansing for a map entitled "Surveys & Partition of the Oriskany or Oriskary Patent," with seven allotments and numerous land claims noted.

Before 1810, the surveyor, Col. Gerritt Lansing, returned to the Oriskany Patent to settle. In 1811, he helped found the Oriskany Manufacturing Company. The company's year of incorporation is commonly cited as the founding date for the resettled village.

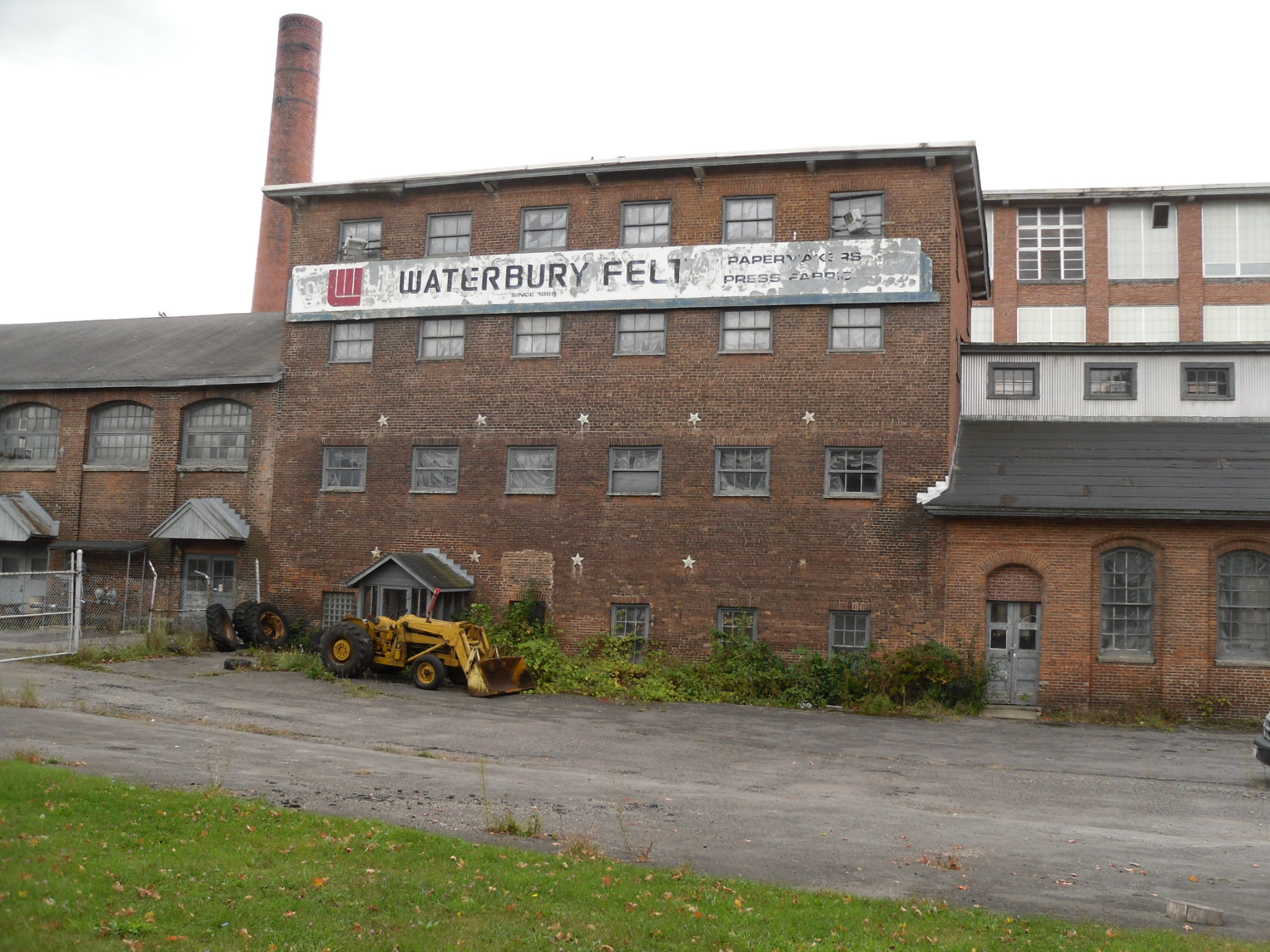
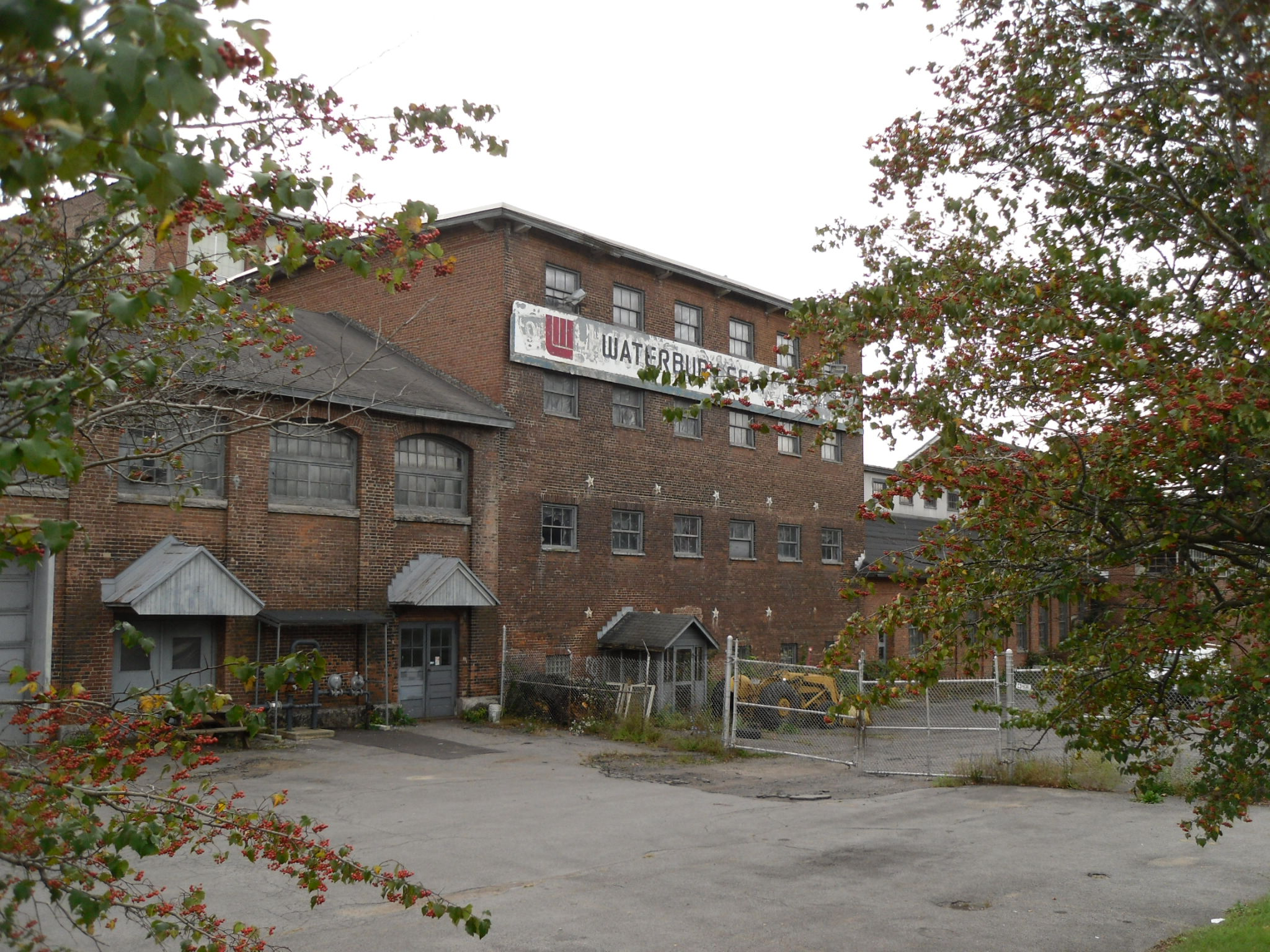
The Waterbury Felt Mill

Oriskany Manufacturing Company would operate for several decades. The site later became the Waterbury Felt Mill.

The Erie Canal passed through the village until it was surpassed by the NYS Barge Canal. The path of the earlier canal later became State Route 69.

The naming of the village from Oriska to Oriskany has become something of an urban legend. As the legend goes, there was a mix up at the post office - a missing comma. Instead of "Oriska, NY" the envelope was labeled as "Oriska NY" and shortly after "Oriskany, NY" was born. This post office legend is disproven by several eighteenth century documents that use "Oriskany," including letters from the Founding Fathers' papers and several extant maps, which antedate the founding of the local post office by decades.

== USS Oriskany ==
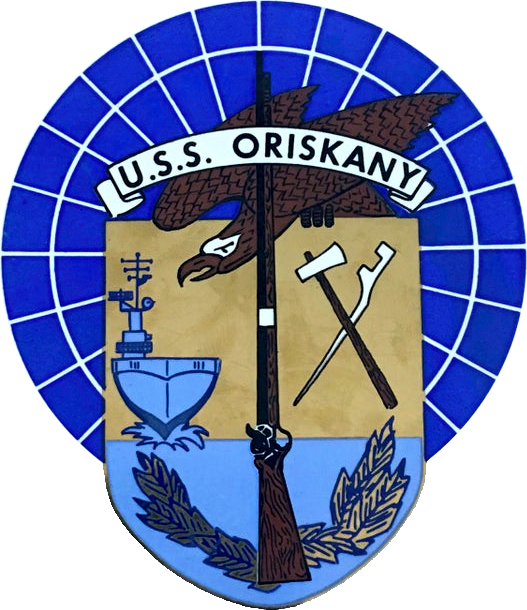
The USS Oriskany Seal

Oriskany had an aircraft carrier named after an American Revolutionary War battle fought there. USS Oriskany served the United States Navy from 1950 to 1976. On May 17, 2006, the ship was laid to rest as an artificial reef in the Gulf of Mexico near Pensacola, Florida. Trinkaus Park, located in Oriskany, has several monuments erected in memory of USS Oriskany. Among the monuments in the park are items from the ship itself including a bell, an anchor, and a Douglas A-4 Skyhawk aircraft.

== Geography ==
Oriskany is located at 43°9.4′N 75°19.9′W (43.1575,-75.3319).

According to the United States Census Bureau, the village has a total area of 0.8 square miles (2.1 km^{2}), all land.

The village is near the confluence of the Mohawk River and Oriskany Creek.

== Demographics ==
Historical population
Census	Pop.	Note	%±
1990	1,450		—
2000	1,459		0.6%
2010	1,400		−4.0%
2020	1,315		−6.1%
U.S. Decennial Census

As of the census of 2000, there were 1,459 people, 500 households, and 379 families residing in the village. The population density was 1,758.0 inhabitants per square mile (678.8/km^{2}). There were 576 housing units at an average density of 694.0 per square mile (268.0/km^{2}).

The largest recorded ethnic ancestries are: American (33.0%), Italian (12.7%), Irish (11.2%), Polish (7.8%), German (7.7%), English (6.1%) representing successive historical waves of immigration to New York. The racialised makeup of the village was 98.83% "White" including 40% of ethnic English or Anglo-American ancestry and 7.7% German ancestry, 1.6% African American, "1.1% South and East Asian, 0.07% from "other races", and 0.07% from two or more "races." Hispanic or Latino ethnicities of any racialised category were 14.3% of the population (Italian (12.7%), 1.6% Latin America).

There were 553 households, out of which 33.8% had children under the age of 18 living with them, 53.7% were married couples living together, 11.9% had a female householder with no husband present, and 31.3% were non-families. 27.8% of all households were made up of individuals, and 14.1% had someone living alone who was 65 years of age or older. The average household size was 2.50 and the average family size was 3.08.

In the village, the population age distribution is 24.5% under the age of 18, 6.8% from 18 to 24, 24.7% from 25 to 44, 24.7% from 45 to 64, and 19.3% who were 65 years of age or older. The median age was 41 years. For every 100 females, there were 81.7 males. For every 100 females age 18 and over, there were 78.4 males.

The median income for a household in the village was $38,365, and the median income for a family was $45,066. Males had a median income of $32,917 versus $22,976 for females. The per capita income for the village was $17,087. About 6.6% of families and 10.0% of the population were below the poverty line, including 17.4% of those under age 18 and 13.7% of those age 65 or over.
