= Gillig Hayward Plant =

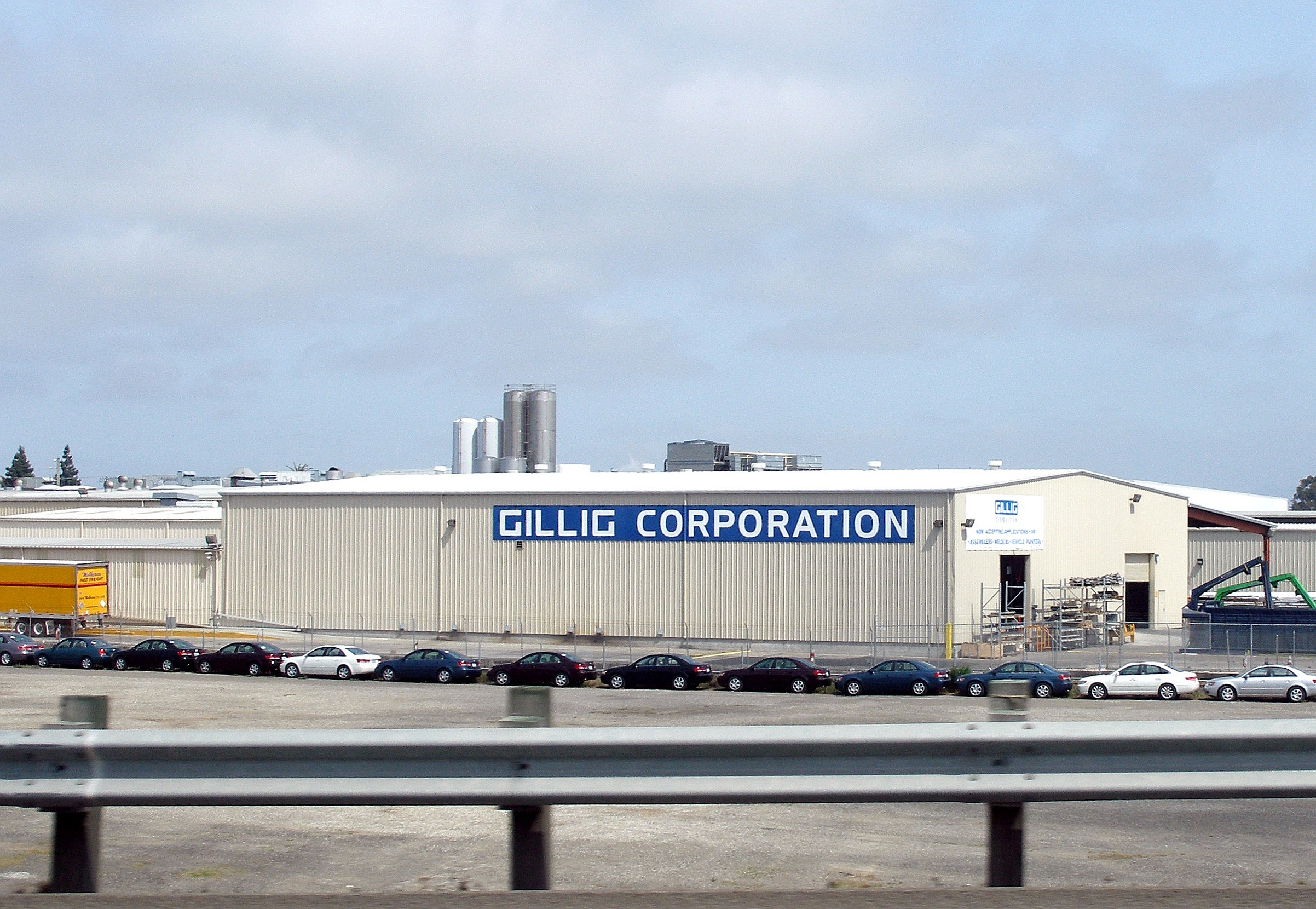
- Former longtime headquarters
- Operated: 1968–2017
- Location: 25800 Clawiter Road; Hayward, California, United States
- Coordinates: 37.6320°N 122.1177°W
- Industry: Automotive
- Products: transit buses
- Employees: 700 (2012)
- Area: 40 acres (16 ha)
- Volume: 615,000 square feet (57,100 m^{2})
- Owner: Gillig Corporation

Gillig Hayward Plant was a transit bus manufacturing plant in Hayward, California owned by Gillig Corporation. The plant was originally opened in 1968 to produce school buses, and was closed in 2017.

== History ==
The plant was opened in 1968 when Gillig Brothers constructed a $1.5 million, 117,000-square-foot manufacturing plant on a 15-acre site in Hayward, the largest bus manufacturing plant in the western United States. In 1976, at the time while Gillig partnered with German manufactuer Neoplan, the plant produced about 200 school buses annually.

On January 29, 2007, about 500 union workers (including roughly 440 workers represented by Teamsters Local 853 and 60 workers represented by the Painters Local 1176) began a four-day strike at the plant. Four days later on February 2nd, the striking employees voted by a 2.5-to-1 margin (233 to 122) to accept the three-year contract, ending the strike.

In 2010, Federal Transit Administration grants helped the company (including its plant) avoid 175 potential layoffs (which accounted for roughly 25% of the plant's total workforce at the time) and stabilize production during the post-recession period. In 2012, Gillig secured a $16.4 million contract with AC Transit to purchase up to 40 low-floor transit buses, keeping roughly 700 workers employed at its Hayward plant with an average wage of $40 per hour.

In 2015, Gillig announced it was outgrowing its Hayward site of nearly 80 years, and was moving its operations to a facility in Livermore. The plant was closed on May 19, 2017, with the final bus produced at the Hayward plant (County Connection bus #1723) rolling off the line on the same day.

== Products ==
- Gillig Transit Coach School Bus (1940–1982)
- Gillig Phantom (1980–2008)
- Gillig Low Floor (1996–2017)

== See also ==
- Gillig Livermore Plant, a Gillig bus manufacturing plant in Livermore, California
