= Gillig Spirit =

Bus manufactured by Gillig Corporation, United States, from 1989 to 1991

Overview
- Type: Bus
- Manufacturer: Gillig Corporation
- Production: 1989–1991

Body and chassis
- Class: Transit bus
- Doors: 2
- Floor type: High-floor

Dimensions
- Length: 28 ft (8.5 m)
- Width: 96 in (2,438 mm)

The Gillig Spirit is a bus that was manufactured by Gillig Corporation from 1989 to 1991. Marketed as a lower-cost alternative to the Gillig Phantom, the Spirit was produced as a transit bus. Through its production run, the Spirit was produced in a 28-foot length, with a 96-inch wide body; like the Phantom, the Spirit was a high-floor bus.

In total, 250 examples of the Gillig Spirit were produced from its Hayward, California facility; all were sold in the United States.

== Powertrain ==
=== Engines ===
- Caterpillar 3208
- Cummins B5.9

=== Transmission ===
- Allison MT-643

== See also ==
- Gillig Corporation
- Gillig Phantom - a larger transit bus produced alongside the Gillig Spirit from 1980 to 2008.
