= Gillig Livermore Plant =

Gillig bus plant in Livermore, C.A., U.S.

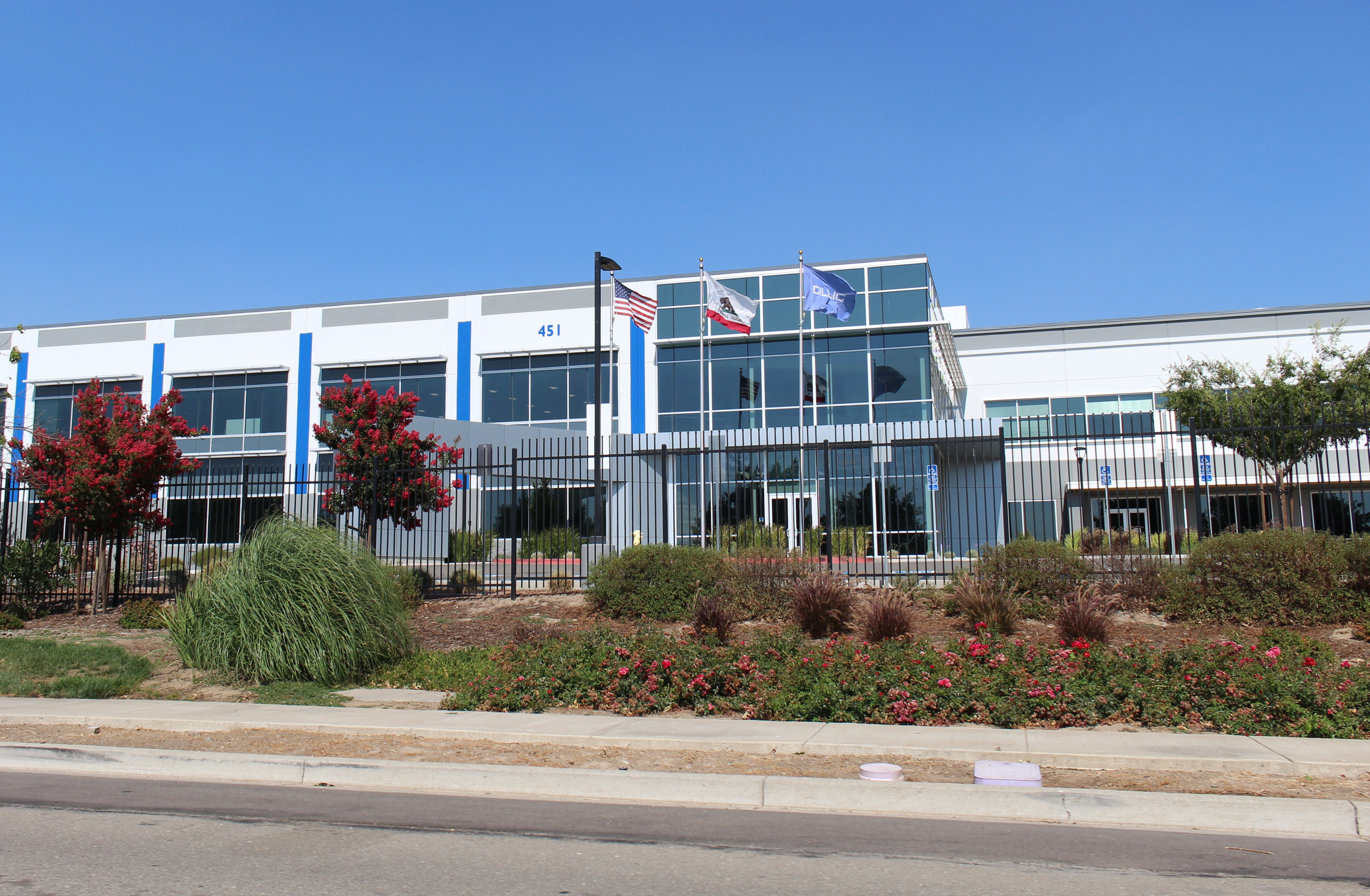
- Gillig headquarters
- Built: 2015–2017
- Operated: 2017–present
- Location: 451 Discovery Drive; Livermore, California, United States
- Coordinates: 37°41′7″N 121°48′39″W
- Industry: Automotive
- Products: transit buses
- Employees: 753
- Area: 40 acres (16 ha)
- Owner: Gillig Corporation

Gillig Livermore Plant is a transit bus manufacturing plant in Livermore, California owned by Gillig Corporation.

== History ==
In February 2015, Gillig announced it would move its corporate headquarters and primary transit bus manufacturing plant from Hayward to a 38-acre site at the Oaks Business Park in Livermore. The plant was opened on June 1, 2017.

In June 2020, Gillig implemented 65 layoffs at the plant when the factory reopened following a broader COVID-19 shutdown.

In July 2026, the Livermore City Council voted to begin negotiations with the company to request to negotiate a $60 million, 17-acre campus expansion at its headquarters and plant.

== Products ==
- Gillig Low Floor (2017–present)

== See also ==
- Gillig Hayward Plant, a former Gillig bus manufacturing plant in Hayward, California
