= Gillig =

American bus manufacturer

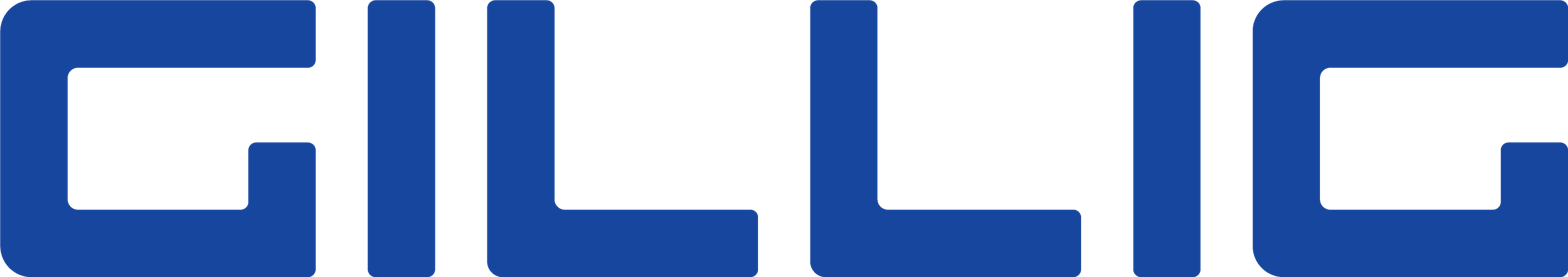

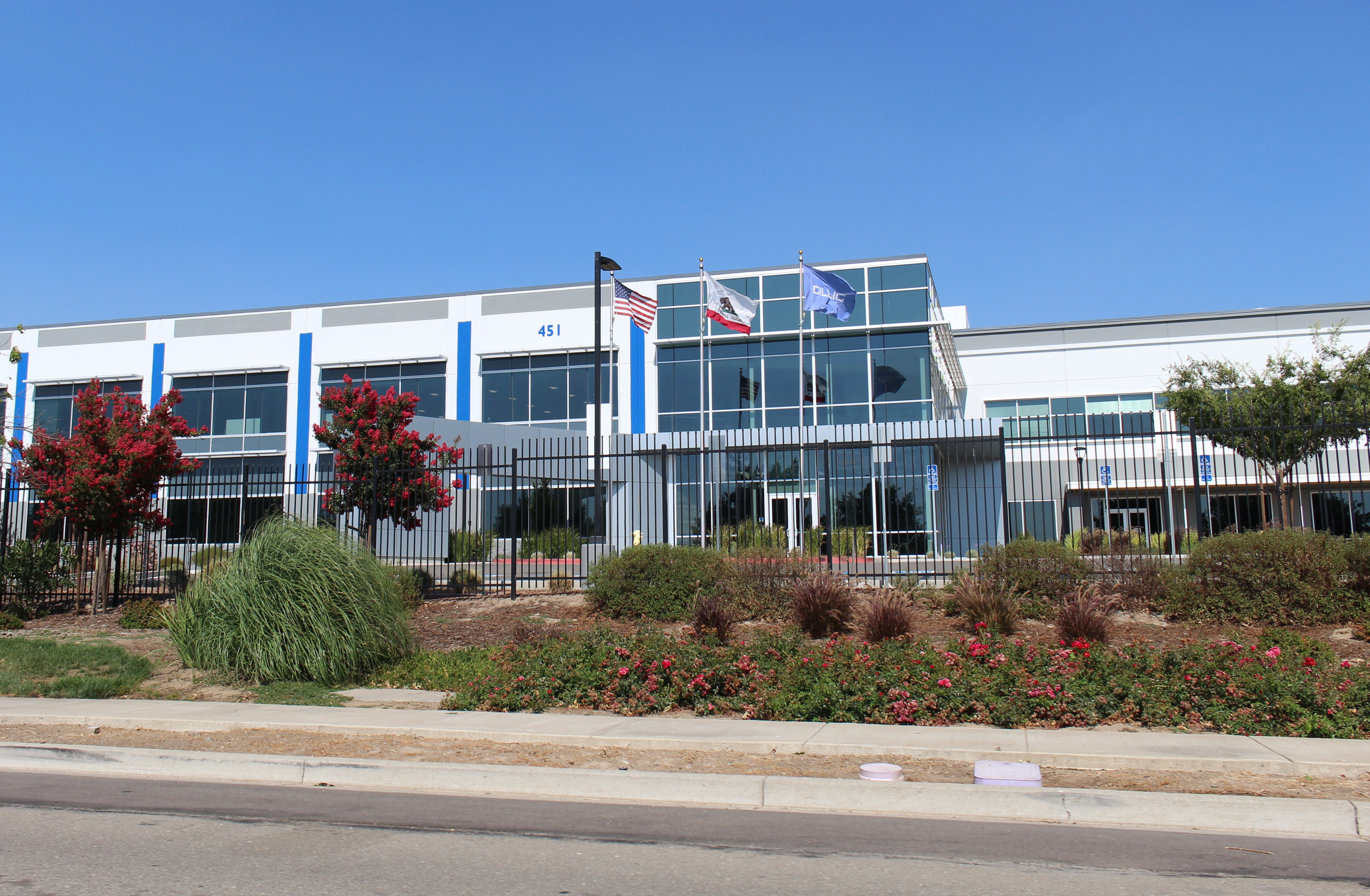
- Gillig headquarters in Livermore
- Type: Private
- Industry: Automotive
- Founded: San Francisco, California, 1890
- Founder: Jacob Gillig
- Headquarters: Livermore, California, U.S., United States
- Area served: North America
- Key people: Derek Maunus (President and CEO); Ben Grunat (Vice President)
- Products: Heavy-duty, low-floor transit buses
- Parent: Henry Crown & Company
- Website: www.gillig.com

Gillig (formerly Gillig Brothers) is an American designer and manufacturer of buses. The company headquarters, along with its manufacturing operations, is located in Livermore, California (in the East Bay region of the San Francisco Bay Area). By volume, Gillig is the second-largest transit bus manufacturer in North America (behind New Flyer). As of 2013, Gillig had an approximate 31 percent market share of the combined United States and Canadian heavy-duty transit bus manufacturing industry, based on the number of equivalent unit deliveries.

While currently a manufacturer of transit buses, from the 1930s to the 1990s, Gillig was a manufacturer of school buses. Alongside the now-defunct Crown Coach, the company was one of the largest manufacturers of school buses on the West Coast of the United States. During the 1960s and the 1970s, Gillig was a West Coast distributor for other manufacturers of conventional-style buses, including Superior Coach Company and Thomas Built Buses. Gillig had been located in Hayward, California, for more than 80 years before moving to Livermore in 2017. The company was founded in San Francisco, by the Gillig brothers.

== History ==
=== 1890–1930 ===
The oldest surviving bus manufacturer in North America, Gillig was founded in 1890 as Jacob Gillig, trained in carriage building and upholstering, opened his own carriage shop in San Francisco. In 1896, his son Leo Gillig entered the business as a shop foreman, becoming a full partner in the business in 1900. The shop was destroyed as part of the 1906 San Francisco earthquake, but the Gilligs rebuilt the shop on a separate property; Chester Gillig joined the business as a bookkeeper. In 1907, Jacob Gillig died at the age of 54.

Following the earthquake, the company reopened as the Leo Gillig Automobile Works, which manufactured custom-built vehicle bodies. In 1914, two major achievements would happen to the company. After building a three-story factory, Leo and Chester Gillig re-organized the company as Gillig Brothers, its name for the next half-century. One of the first bodies built inside the new factory was one for a motor bus, though production would not shift entirely to buses for another two decades.

During the 1910s, most cars in the United States were open touring cars; at the time, fully enclosed sedan bodies were expensive. To offer improvement over the minimal weather protection, Gillig developed an add-on hardtop, patenting its own version in 1919.

The increase of closed car production in the 1920s would render the "Gillig Top" largely obsolete by 1925. While other hardtop manufacturers went out of business, Gillig survived largely on its body production, which became its primary source of revenue. In the late 1920s, the company would briefly produce pleasure boats and produce a prototype of a heavy truck; the latter would never enter production.

=== 1930–1950 ===
Following the start of the Great Depression, Gillig Brothers began to look for a steady source of revenue to ensure its survival. Although the company had produced buses sporadically since 1914, in 1932, Gillig designed its first school bus body, a configuration it would produce for most of the next 60 years. In 1935, the company designed its first ambulance body; it also became the West Coast distributor of Superior Coach Company, a manufacturer of school buses and professional cars. In 1937, Gillig introduced its first flat-front (transit-style) school bus.

By 1938, demand for school buses had surpassed the capacity of the San Francisco facility, leading Gillig Brothers to move to Hayward, California, on the eastern side of San Francisco Bay.

In 1940, as a response to the Crown Supercoach, the first Gillig Transit Coach was introduced, as both a coach and school bus. The first mid-engine school bus, the Transit Coach wore an all-steel body and was powered by a Hall-Scott gasoline engine. During World War II, Gillig halted school bus production, instead producing trailer buses to transport workers in defense factories.

Following the end of the war, Gillig resumed production of the Transit Coach, introducing a rear-engine version in 1948. In 1950, the body of the Transit Coach was redesigned.

=== 1950–1980 ===
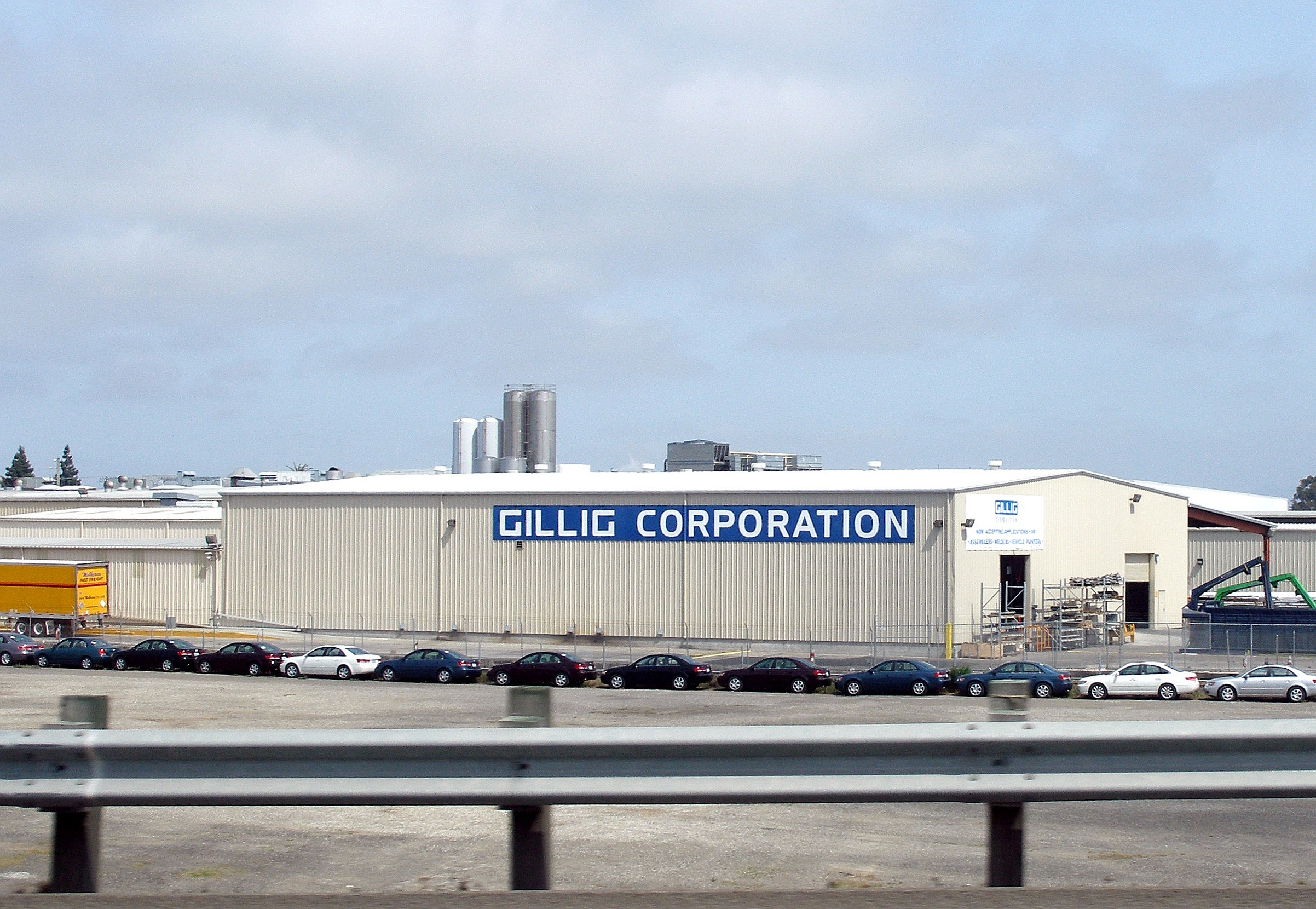
Former longtime headquarters in Hayward

In 1953, Chester Gillig retired, following the death of Leo Gillig. The management structure of the family-run company was changed, with Stanley Marx (previously in charge of sales), assuming control of Gillig. In 1957, a major acquisition was made as Gillig purchased the Pacific bus division of Washington-based truck manufacturer Kenworth. At the time, Gillig controlled a 70% market share of Northern California over Crown Coach (based in Los Angeles), along with a similar share of Washington State, Oregon, and Nevada.

In 1959, the company introduced the first rear-engine school bus with a diesel engine: the Cummins C-Series Transit Coach. Although still offered with gasoline engines in various configurations, the C-Series Transit Coach accounted for over three-quarter of all Gillig sales within only five years. In 1967, Gillig would introduce the largest school bus ever produced: the tandem-axle DT16. Along with it corresponding Crown Coach competitor, the DT16 is the only 97-passenger school bus ever produced in the United States (during 1977, its capacity was reduced to 90).

In 1968, Gillig moved into a 117,000-square-foot manufacturing plant in Hayward, the largest bus manufacturing plant in the western United States. In 1978, Stanley Marx retired from Gillig, and the firm was sold to Herrick-Pacific Steel, a Hayward-based steel manufacturer. Following the sale, the company was reorganized as Gillig Corporation, its present-day name.

To diversify its product line, in the mid-1970s, Gillig began plans to enter the transit bus segment. Following the end of the "New Look" near-monopoly of GMC and Flxible, in mid-1976, Gillig entered a partnership with West German manufacturer Neoplan to build a series of European-styled transit buses. The 30-foot "Gillig-Neoplan" buses featured propane-fueled engines as an option; the partnership with Neoplan lasted until 1979.

=== 1980–2000 ===
As a more permanent follow-up to the Gillig-Neoplan, the Gillig Phantom entered production in 1980. The first dedicated transit bus produced by Gillig, the Phantom would be produced from 1980 to 2008. A State of California tax-free subsidy helped early sales. Later sales were buoyed by low bids on contracts, and by specializing in serving smaller transit agencies. This strategy proved successful, as the Phantom became one of the longest-lasting transit models. In 1989, Gillig would introduce the Gillig Spirit; similar to the Gillig-Neoplan, the Spirit was a shorter, medium-duty transit bus.

After over 40 years in production, the Transit Coach ended production in 1982. After a temporary hiatus from school bus production, Gillig returned with a Phantom school bus in 1986. While initially successful, the Phantom school bus would be discontinued in 1993 following poor sales (no examples were sold in 1991 or 1992).

In 1996, following an expansion of the Hayward facility, Gillig introduced the H2000LF, its first low-floor bus. In 1997, it entered full-scale production as the Gillig Advantage. Originally designed as a rental-car shuttle bus, the Low Floor became popular as a second transit bus product line alongside the standard-floor Phantom.

=== 2000–present ===
During the 2000s, Gillig would make a number of advances with its vehicles, exploring the uses of alternative fuels and hybrid technologies in both the Low Floor and the Phantom. In 2005, the Low Floor became available in BRT and Trolley Replica body styles.

After 28 years of production, the final Gillig Phantom was produced in 2008; by the mid-2000s, high-floor buses had largely fallen out of favor with transit customers.

On August 1, 2008, Gillig became a Henry Crown company under CC Industries, Inc. CC Industries operated Gillig in the same location with the current management team.

In 2015, Gillig Corporation marked the 125th anniversary of its founding.

In May 2017, the company moved its factory from Hayward, California, to Livermore, another East Bay region city, after more than 80 years in Hayward. The move was precipitated by a need for more space, with production having outgrown the Hayward facility. The new Livermore facility, which comprises newly constructed buildings, includes a 600,000-square-foot (56,000 m^{2}) main building and two smaller buildings, measuring 50,000 ft^{2} (4,600 m^{2}) and 27,000 ft^{2} (2,500 m^{2}). Gillig plans to retain at the Hayward site a 500,000 ft^{2} (46,000 m^{2}) warehouse for the sale of parts, but plans to sell the remainder of the Hayward factory, which closed on May 19, 2017. At the time of the move, the company was predicting that around 850 workers would be employed at the Livermore complex.

In February 2024, Gillig announced that its Gerco subsidiary had acquired select assets of bankrupt battery and commercial vehicle company Lightning eMotors in Loveland, Colorado and would open a powertrain engineering center with former Lightning talent.

On April 24, 2024, Gillig announced that they would be making hydrogen-electric buses, in collaboration with BAE Systems and Ballard Power Systems.

== Alternative fuels ==
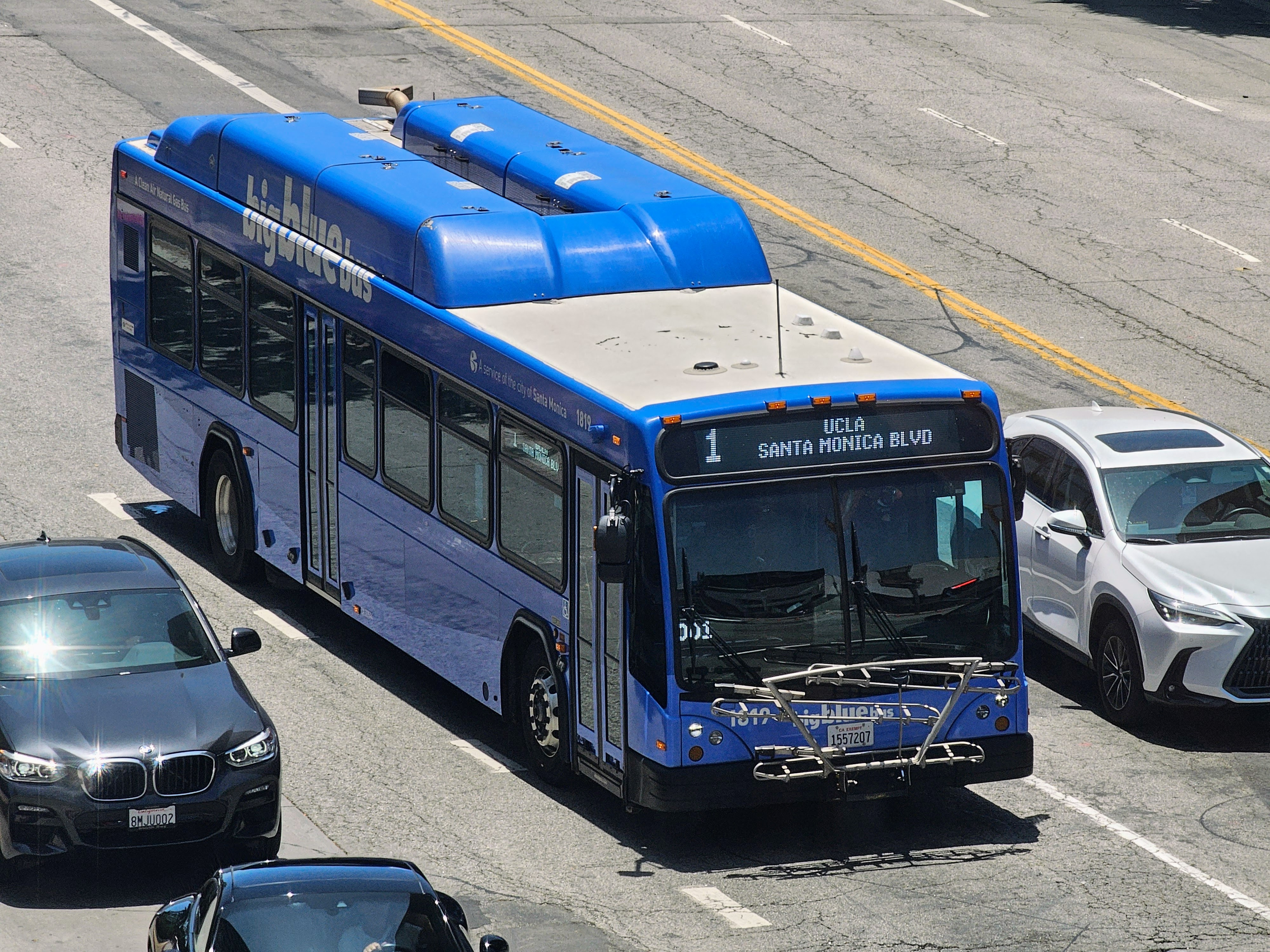
A CNG-fueled Gillig BRT operated by Big Blue Bus

In 1992, Gillig began producing an LNG fueled version of the Phantom as a lower emissions option, but discontinued it in 1998. The only remaining LNG Phantoms currently operate shuttle service at Los Angeles International Airport and Dallas/Fort Worth International Airport.

In 1996, Gillig introduced a diesel-electric hybrid powered Phantom, which they produced until 2006. The current models continue to be offered in a hybrid powered versions.

In September 2011, Gillig introduced an alternative fuel BRT model with CNG propulsion—their first CNG-powered bus produced and first production natural gas buses since 1998. Long Beach Transit purchased a pilot bus in 2011, and placed an order for 63 more in 2012.

Gillig and Cummins announced a partnership to develop a battery-electric bus using Cummins technology on October 9, 2017. On May 16, 2019, the two companies unveiled a new all-electric bus. The bus uses the Gillig Low Floor platform and is equipped with a traction motor with a peak power and torque of 350 kW (470 hp; 480 PS) and 3,500 N⋅m (2,600 lb⋅ft); it is expected to have a range of approximately 150 mi (240 km), based on battery capacity (444 kW-hr) and consumption (2.3 kW-hr/mi). The first bus was scheduled to be delivered to Big Blue Bus (serving Santa Monica, California) in May 2020, but it was inaugurated into service on August 19, 2019.

== Trolleybuses ==
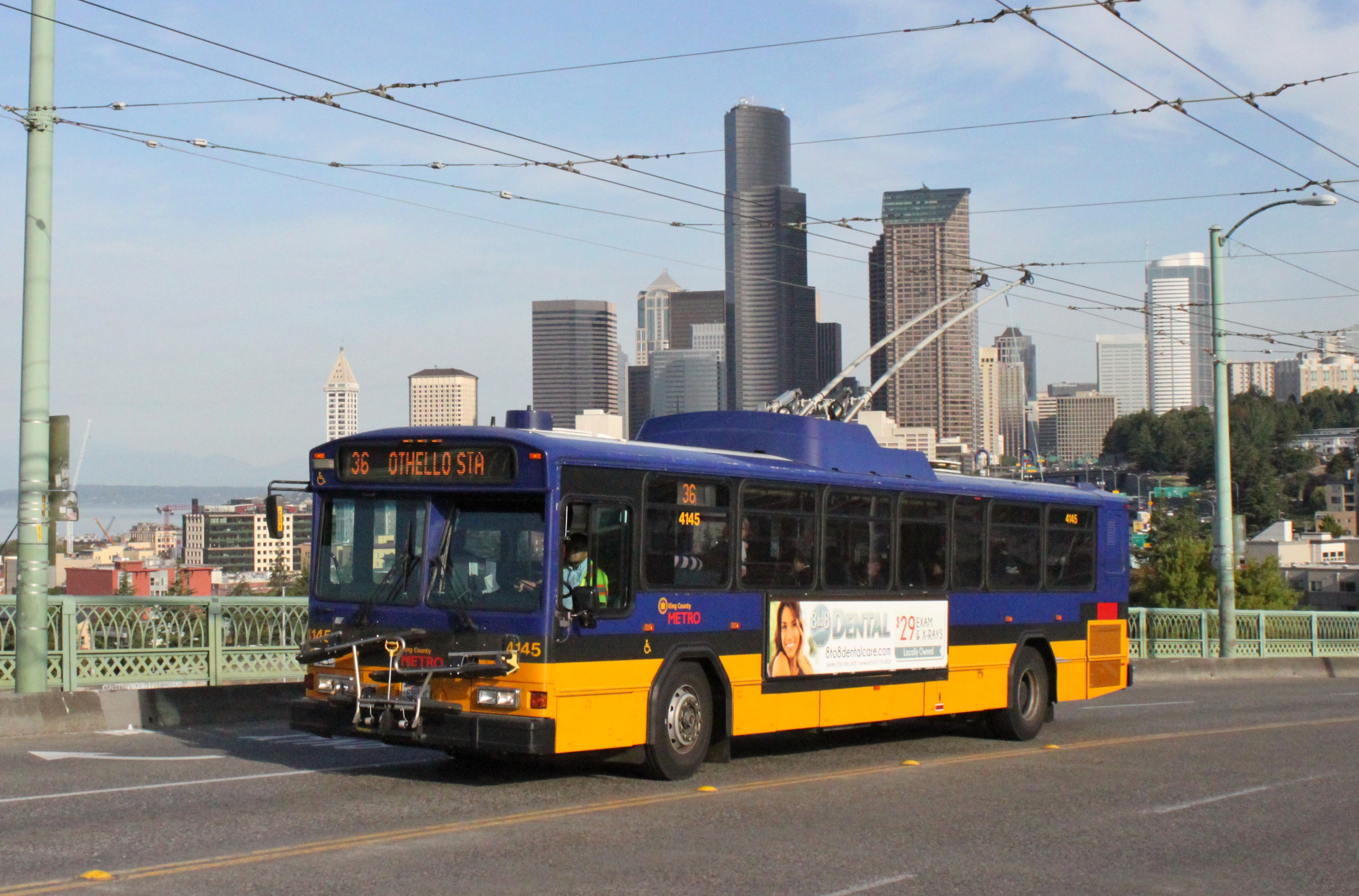
Gillig Phantom-bodied trolleybus operated by King County Metro in Seattle

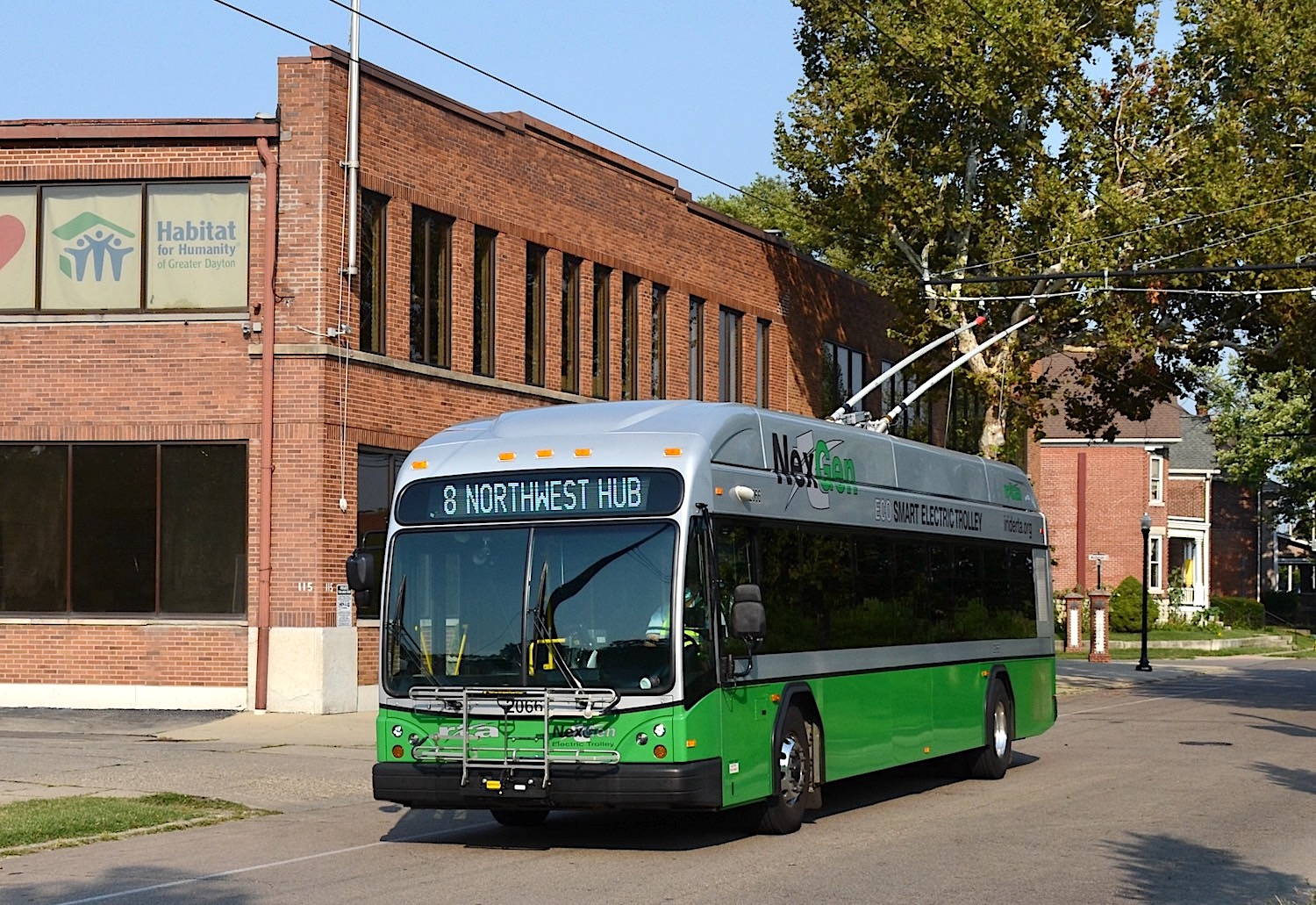
Gillig BRT-bodied dual-mode trolley operated by Greater Dayton RTA in Dayton, Ohio

Although Gillig has never built a complete electric trolleybus, the company has supplied body-chassis shells for others to later equip as trolleybuses.

Between 2001 and 2002, Gillig supplied 100 Phantom body-chassis shells to King County Metro Transit. Gillig shipped these Phantom buses in fairly complete form, including interior fittings such as seats—lacking only propulsion equipment including trolleypoles. Meanwhile, the Seattle transit agency removed the propulsion system (GE traction motor, Randtronics chopper control, and electronic card cage) from its old fleet of 1979-built AM General trolley coaches which the Gillig vehicles were purchased to replace, and shipped them to Alstom for refurbishment. After Alstom refurbished the propulsion system, Metro installed the equipment into the new Gillig Phantom bodies, along with Kiepe pneumatically operated fiberglass trolley poles.

Between 2014 and 2020, Kiepe partnered with Gillig to produce new dual-mode trolleybuses for the Greater Dayton Regional Transit Authority. Gillig shipped four BRTPlus body-chassis shells to Kiepe to build prototype coaches, two of which function as battery electric buses while away from electrical wires and two of which use a diesel generator. Two of these prototypes were equipped with diesel-powered generators to power the traction motors off-wire (similar to a hybrid bus) and two use batteries for off-wire operations. After successful testing, Dayton ordered 41 production battery-electric trolleys from Kiepe and Gillig, and they were delivered in 2019–2020.

== Products ==
Gillig transit buses (Current)
Model name	Production	Configuration	Length	Notes
Gillig Low Floor	1996–present	Low-floor transit bus	29, 35, 40 ft (8.8, 10.7, 12.2 m)	Originally designed as airport shuttle bus (Gillig H2000LF); released as the Gillig Advantage transit bus in 1998.; Front end-cap (windshield and destination sign) redesigned in 2002.; Available with CNG, Diesel, hydrogen-electric, or Hybrid diesel-electric powertrains.; Suburban configuration available (higher seating capacity with reclining seats and options for overhead luggage racks, power outlets and no rear passenger door).; Side windows are available with either framed or frameless glass.
Gillig Low Floor Plus	2017–present	Low-floor transit bus	29, 35, 40 ft (8.8, 10.7, 12.2 m)	Front end-cap similar to BRT with the Low Floor (Advantage) windshield and rear end.; Available with CNG, Diesel, Hybrid diesel-electric, hydrogen-electric or Battery-Electric powertrains.; Suburban configuration available (higher seating capacity with reclining seats and options for overhead luggage racks, power outlets and no rear passenger door).; Side windows are available with either framed or frameless glass.
Gillig BRT	2005–present	Low-floor transit bus	29, 35, 40 ft (8.8, 10.7, 12.2 m)	Variant of Gillig Low Floor (BRT=Bus Rapid Transit) fitted with streamlined bodywork (including front and rear end-caps).; Available with CNG, Diesel, hydrogen-electric or Hybrid diesel-electric powertrains.; Suburban configuration available (higher seating capacity with reclining seats and options for overhead luggage racks, power outlets and no rear passenger door).; Side windows are available with either framed or frameless glass.
Gillig BRT Plus	2011–present	Low-floor transit bus	29, 35, 40 ft (8.8, 10.7, 12.2 m)	Variant of Gillig Low Floor fitted with both streamlined bodywork and streamlined roof fairings; Available with CNG, Diesel, hydrogen-electric or Hybrid diesel-electric powertrains; Suburban configuration available (higher seating capacity with reclining seats and options for overhead luggage racks, power outlets and no rear passenger door)
Gillig Low Floor Trolley	2005–present	Low-floor transit bus	29, 35, 40 ft (8.8, 10.7, 12.2 m)	A variant of Gillig Low Floor fitted with solid oak seats, brass-colored interior handholds, wood-like exterior trim, cupola, brass bell, and cowcatcher-style front bumper.; Produced in collaboration with Cable Car Classics.; Available with CNG, Diesel, hydrogen-electric, or Hybrid diesel-electric powertrains.
Gillig transit buses (discontinued)
Gillig Phantom	1980–2008	High-floor transit bus	30, 35, 40 ft (9.1, 10.7, 12.2 m)	Offered in 102" or 96" widths.; A hybrid version was also offered from 2001 to 2006.; Also produced as a school bus from 1986 to 1993
Gillig Spirit	mid-late 1980s	High-floor transit bus	28 ft (8.5 m)	A 28-foot (8.5 m) medium-duty bus offered as lower-cost alternative to the 30-foot-long (9.1 m) Phantom.
Gillig-Neoplan	1977–1979	High floor transit bus	30, 35 ft (9.1, 10.7 m)	A rear-engined transit bus built as a joint venture with German bus manufacturer Neoplan.; Available with either diesel or propane engines.
Gillig school buses (discontinued)
Gillig Transit Coach School Bus	1940–1982	School Bus	28–40 ft (8.5–12.2 m)	A line of transit-style buses produced in several configurations; produced nearly exclusively as a school bus.; Discontinued in 1982; replaced by Phantom school bus.; Available in mid-engine and rear-engine models with single or tandem rear axles.; Along with Crown Supercoach, highest-capacity school bus ever produced.
Gillig Coach school bus	c.1940–1981	School bus	Various (to 40 feet)	Variant of Gillig Transit Coach; body modified to fit customer-supplied cowled truck chassis Produced on a limited basis after Gillig became distributor for other manufacturers of conventional-style buses like Superior Coach Company and Thomas Built Buses. The final example of the Gillig Coach was produced in 1981, and was an International S-1800.
Gillig Phantom School Bus	1986–1993	School Bus (rear-engine)	37, 40 ft (11.3, 12.2 m)	96" wide version of the Gillig Phantom redesigned to school bus specifications Replaced Gillig Transit Coach; produced from 1986 to 1993

=== VIN ===
Gillig uses the following vehicle identification number (VIN) scheme:

VIN digit
1–3	4	5	6–7	8	9	10	11	12–17
World Mfr ID	Model or Line	Length	Engine	Brake	Check Digit	Model Year	Manufacturing; Plant	Serial Number (sequential)
15G: Gillig (bus); 46G: Gillig (incomplete)	A: School bus; B: Utility bus; C: City transit bus; D: Suburban bus; E: Incomplete vehicle; F: Shuttle bus; G: Low Floor bus	A: 30-foot; B: 35-foot; C: 37-foot; D: 40-foot or incomplete vehicle; E: 27/28/28.5-foot	01: CAT 3208, 200 HP; 02: CAT 3208, 210 HP; 03: CAT 3208, 225 HP; 04: CAT 3208; 05: CAT NHHTCC; 06: DD 6–71; 07: DD 6V-53; 08: DD 6V-92, 260 HP; 09: DD 6V-92; 10: Chev 427; 11: DD 8.2; 12: Cumm L-10; 13: Ford 460; 14: DD 6V-71; 15: CAT 3116; 16: CAT 3176; 17: DD 8V-92; 18: Cumm C8.3/ISC; 19: Cumm B5.9/ISB; 20: DD S50; 21: Cumm M11; 22: DD S40; 23: DD S60; 24: CAT 3126; 25: CAT C-12; 26: DD S40; 27: Cumm ISL; 28: Fuel cell & electric motor; 29: Cumm ISL 8.9L EPA 04; 30: Cumm ISB 6.7L; 31: Cumm ISL G NZ	1: Air; 2: Hydraulic	IAW FMVSS; Part 565.4	IAW FMVSS; Part 565.4	1: Hayward, CA; 2: Hillsboro, TX; 3: Livermore, CA	

== Links ==
- Gillig, LLC, gillig.com, retrieved on 2006-12-25
- Transit Coach / Pacific SchoolCoach Online Museum, gilligcoaches.net, retrieved on 2006-12-25, archived from the original at http://www.gilligcoaches.net/ archive date: 2006-12-30
- Leo Gillig Automobile Works – Gillig Brothers, coachbuilt.com, retrieved on 2006-12-25
- A Brief History of Hall-Scott, northern.edu, retrieved on 2006-12-26
- GM Brings Clean Mass Transit to Environmental Conference, allisontransmission.com, retrieved on 2006-12-25
- Stauss, Ed (1988). The Bus World Encyclopedia of Buses, Woodland Hills, CA: Stauss Publications. ISBN 0-9619830-0-0
