= Gillig Transit Coach School Bus =

Gillig Transit Coach
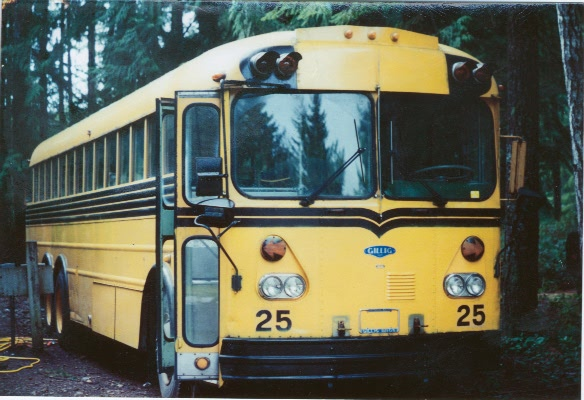
- 1977 Gillig 97-passenger Transit Coach Model DT-16, one of the largest school buses ever produced

Overview
- Manufacturer: Gillig Brothers (1940–1969); Gillig Corporation (1969–1982)
- Production: 1940–1982
- Assembly: Hayward, California

Body and chassis
- Class: Type D (transit-style)
- Body style: School bus
- Layout: Monocoque stressed skin: rear-engine 4×2; rear-engine 6×4; mid-engine 4×2; mid-engine 6×4
- Platform: Gillig

Powertrain
- Engine: Gasoline: 534 cu in (8.8 L) Ford Super Duty V8; 590 cu in (9.7 L) Hall-Scott 590 inline-6; 501 cu in (8.2 L) International Harvester Red Diamond inline-6; Diesel: 636 cu in (10.4 L) Caterpillar 1160/3208 V8; 672 cu in (11.0 L) Cummins NHH inline-6; 743 cu in (12.2 L) Cummins NHH inline-6; 855 cu in (14.0 L) Cummins NHHTC inline-6; 555 cu in (9.1 L) Cummins VTF555 V8; 318 cu in (5.2 L) Detroit Diesel 6V53 V6; 426 cu in (7.0 L) Detroit Diesel 6N71 inline-6
- Capacity: 60–97 passengers
- Transmission: Spicer 6252 5-speed manual; Fuller T905 5-speed manual; Fuller RT610 10-speed manual; Allison MT643 4-speed automatic; Allison MT644 4-speed automatic; Allison HT740 4-speed automatic

Dimensions
- Length: 28–40 feet (8.5–12.2 m)
- Width: 96 inches (2.4 m)

Chronology
- Successor: Gillig Phantom School Bus

The Gillig Transit Coach School Bus is a series of buses that were produced by the American bus manufacturer Gillig from 1940 to 1982. Alongside its namesake usage as a yellow school bus, the Transit Coach also served as the basis of motorcoaches and other commercial-use vehicles. Marketed primarily to operators on or near the West Coast of the United States (California, Washington State, or Oregon), the Transit Coach competed nearly exclusively against the similar Crown Supercoach through much of its production.

The Transit Coach was the first school bus produced with a mid-engine layout and would be among the first to use a diesel-fueled engine. The model line also offered the highest-capacity school bus ever produced, offering up to 97-passenger seating (current design standards restrict maximum capacity to 90).

After 1982, Gillig discontinued the Transit Coach after 42 years of production, concentrating its resources on the Gillig Phantom transit bus. For 1986, the company reentered school bus production, developing a school bus variant of the Phantom that was offered from 1986 through 1993; the high-floor Phantom was manufactured through 2008.

The Transit Coach was manufactured by Gillig in its now-former facility in Hayward, California; while no longer a manufacturer of school buses, Gillig currently exists as the second-largest American manufacturer of transit buses.

== Background ==
Founded in 1890, Gillig Brothers initially existed as a manufacturer of custom-built automobile bodies. In the 1920s, the company produced the "Gillig top", a lift-off hardtop for open cars that provided retractable side curtains. As closed cars became more widely available, the company focused on body production, producing its first school bus body in 1932. In 1937, Gillig Brothers moved from San Francisco to Hayward, California.

During the late 1930s, school bus manufacturers were beginning to develop transit-style school buses. In comparison to a cowled-chassis bus mounted on a truck frame, a transit-style bus allowed for greater seating capacity within the same body length; manufacturers also experimented with engine configurations.

== Design history ==
=== 1940–1957 ===
In 1940, after several years of experimenting, Gillig introduced the production Transit Coach. Using a Fabco chassis powered by a Hall-Scott gasoline engine, the Transit Coach adopted a mid-engine configuration, placing the engine on its side.

During World War II, Gillig entered war production, building hundreds of "Victory Trailer" trailer buses, serving as large-scale transportation on US military bases.

Following the war, the company returned to production of buses, with the Transit Coach resuming production. In 1948, a rear-engine configuration (in line with many other competitors) was introduced for the first time. Alongside the Transit Coach, Gillig sold the Gillig Coach conventional bus, sharing elements of its body design with its transit-style counterpart.

Through the early 1950s, the mid-engine Transit Coach overtook the rear-engine configuration in demand. In 1950, Gillig introduced the Model 590, fitted with a 590 cubic-inch Hall-Scott engine, the largest-displacement gasoline engine ever fitted in a school bus. The early 1950s Transit Coach was offered in multiple seating capacities, up to 79 passengers.

Through most of the 1950s, the Transit Coach design had only minor changes, distinguished from later examples by a smaller windshield, lower roofline, different Gillig badging, and dual (instead of quad) headlamps.

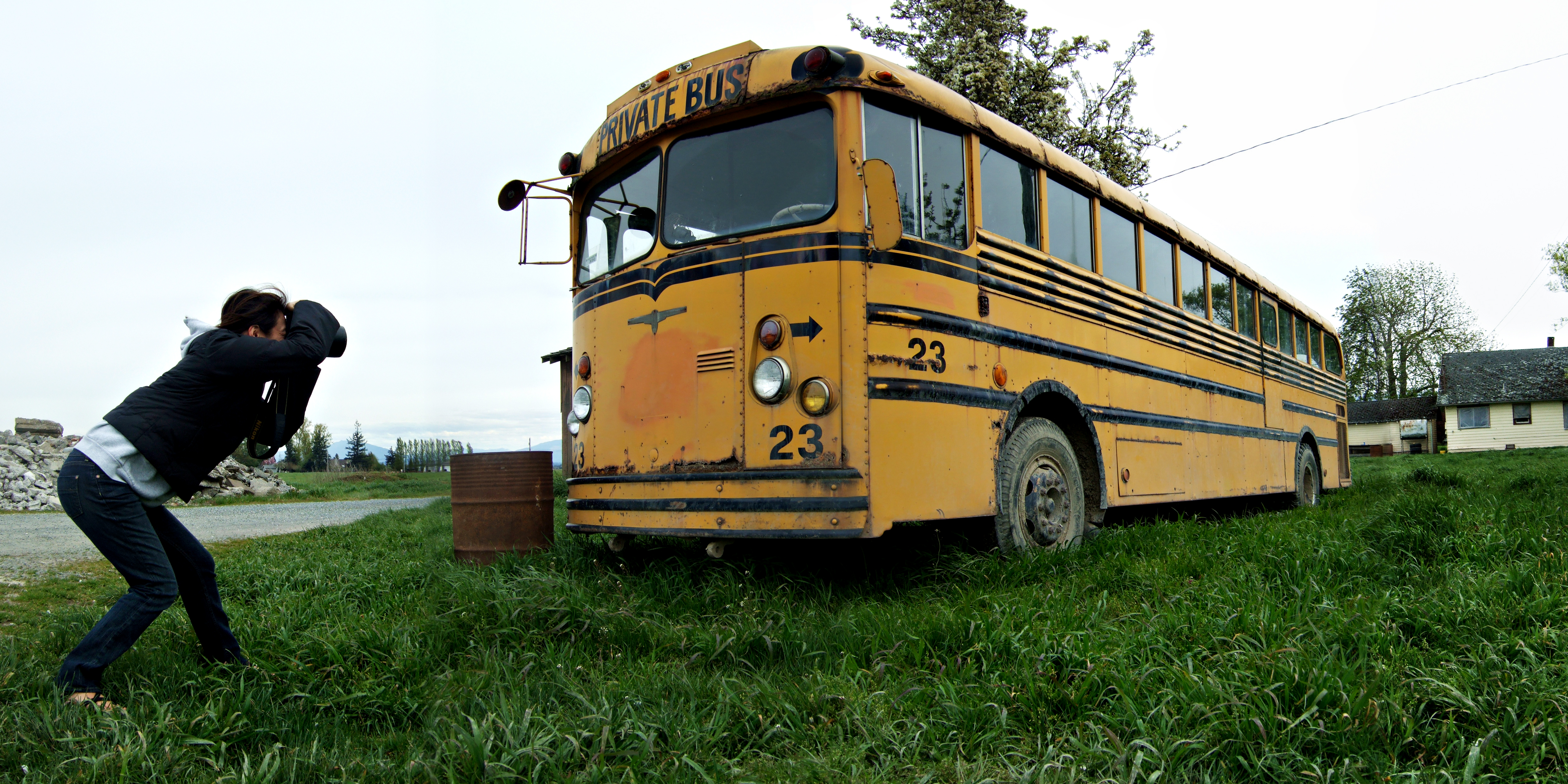
Mid-1950s rear-engine school bus

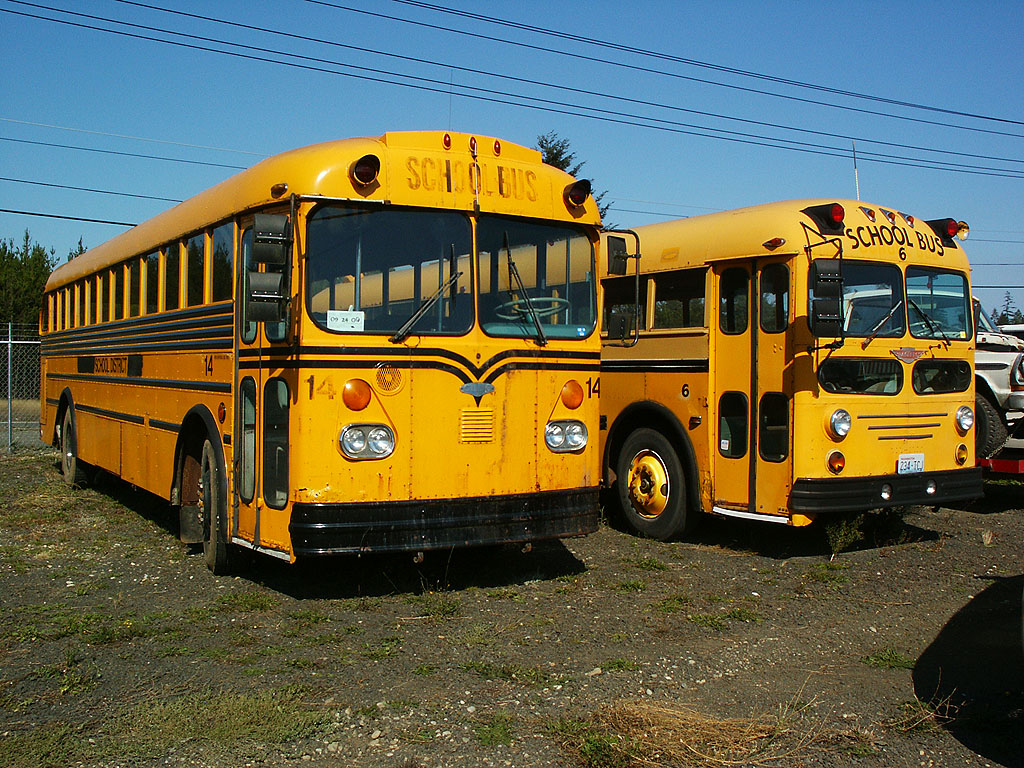
1955 Kenworth T216 school bus (right) with 1966 Gillig

=== 1957–1977 ===
In 1957, Kenworth ended its presence in the bus segment, resulting in Gillig obtaining the product rights to the Pacific bus product lines. With the acquisition of the tooling from Kenworth, the roofline of the Transit Coach was introduced with redesigned front and rear roof caps. While Gillig would not adopt the four-pane windshield of the Pacific T-Series, the Transit Coach saw its windshield expanded in size (from 2,340 to 2,580 square inches); until its 1982 discontinuation, the model line offered the largest windshield on a school bus.

Along with restructuring school bus production on the West Coast to essentially a Gillig Transit Coach–Crown Supercoach duopoly, the acquisition of Pacific led to design changes for the Transit Coach that were retained for the rest of its production.

In 1959, Gillig introduced the first diesel-powered Transit Coach, offering two models. Similar to the Crown Supercoach, the mid-engine Model 743 was powered by a 743 cubic-inch Cummins NHH220 underfloor inline-6; the Model C-180 was the first diesel-powered school bus with a rear-mounted engine (Cummins C-180). To increase intake ventilation for the diesel engine, Gillig added a roof-mounted air intake (first used on the Pacific, in slightly different form). As another addition, the Model 534 was a rear-engine bus powered by a Ford Super Duty gasoline V8 (replacing the Hall-Scott and International Harvester engines). The rear-engine diesel Transit Coach would prove successful, as manufacturers of rear-engine transits from the eastern United States did not widely offer diesel engines until the 1970s; Crown did not offer a diesel rear-engine Supercoach (in school bus form) until the late 1980s.

During the 1960s, in response to the Baby Boom generation reaching school age, school buses grew in size to accommodate the growth of student populations. From 1948, the highest-capacity Transit Coach offered seating for 79 student passengers. In 1967, several changes were made to the Transit Coach. The Model 743DT-16 was introduced, expanding from 13 to 16 rows of seating by extending the body to 41 feet long, requiring tandem rear axles. Offering a seating capacity of 97 student passengers, the DT-16 was the largest school bus ever mass-produced. In line with similar Crown Supercoaches, the DT-16 was configured with tandem rear axles; unlike motorcoaches, both rear axles were driven. In another change, the interior height was raised 7 inches, from 72 inches to 79 inches. A rear-engine version of the DT-16 was offered, the 636DT-16, powered by the Caterpillar 1160 V8 (later the 3208).

In the early 1970s, Gillig introduced several new engines and retired others. In 1971, the first Detroit Diesel engine was offered, the Model 318D (powered by a 6V53 V6). In 1974, the Model 743 became the Model 855, as the Cummins NHH engine was enlarged to 855 cubic inches; in contrast to its 220 hp predecessor, turbocharged versions were introduced (available up to 335 hp). In 1974, the final gasoline-powered Transit Coach was produced. In 1976 and 1976, the Transit Coach introduced the Model 555 and Model 426, powered by the Cummins VTF555 V8 and Detroit Diesel 6N71 inline-6, respectively.

In 1974, the interior of the Transit Coach underwent a revision, with a molded-fiberglass dashboard replacing the previous all-metal design. To improve driver ergonomics, key switches were relocated from under the steering wheel onto a single control panel left of the driver; many full-size school buses use this layout to this day. In states outside of California, amber warning lights began to be phased in as a requirement alongside the red warning lights (seen since the 1940s); in 1975, the Transit Coach was offered with amber warning lights for the first time (to meet Washington State specifications).

1966 Gillig Transit Coach Model 743D (retired)

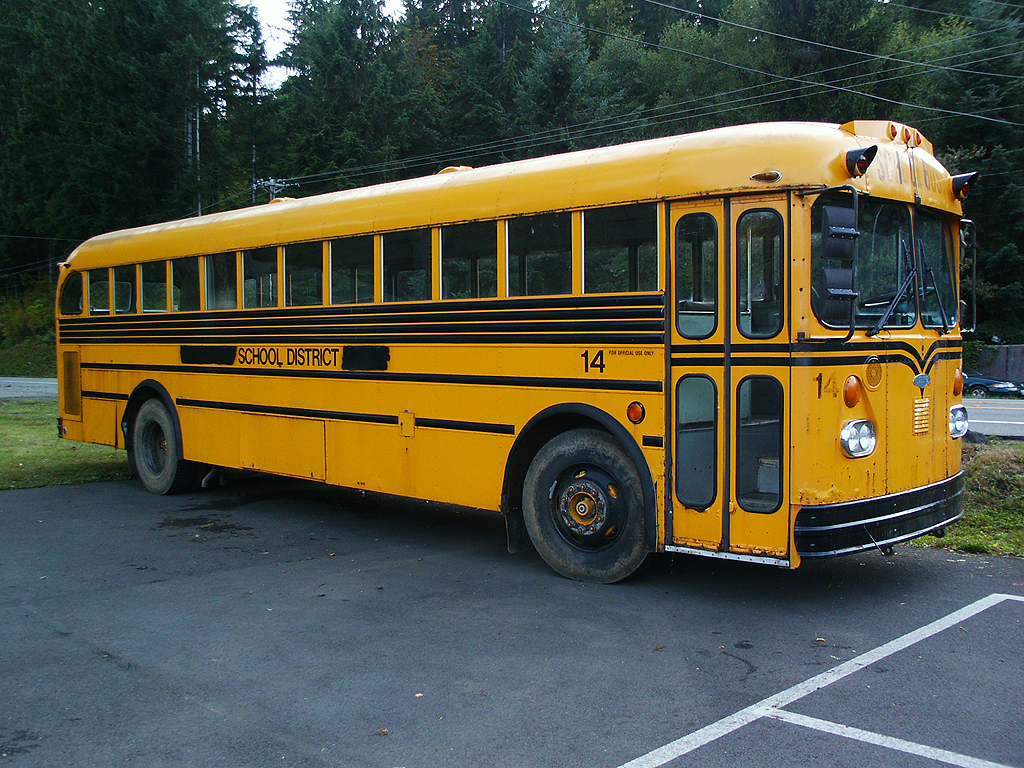
1966 Gillig Transit Coach Model C-180D (retired)

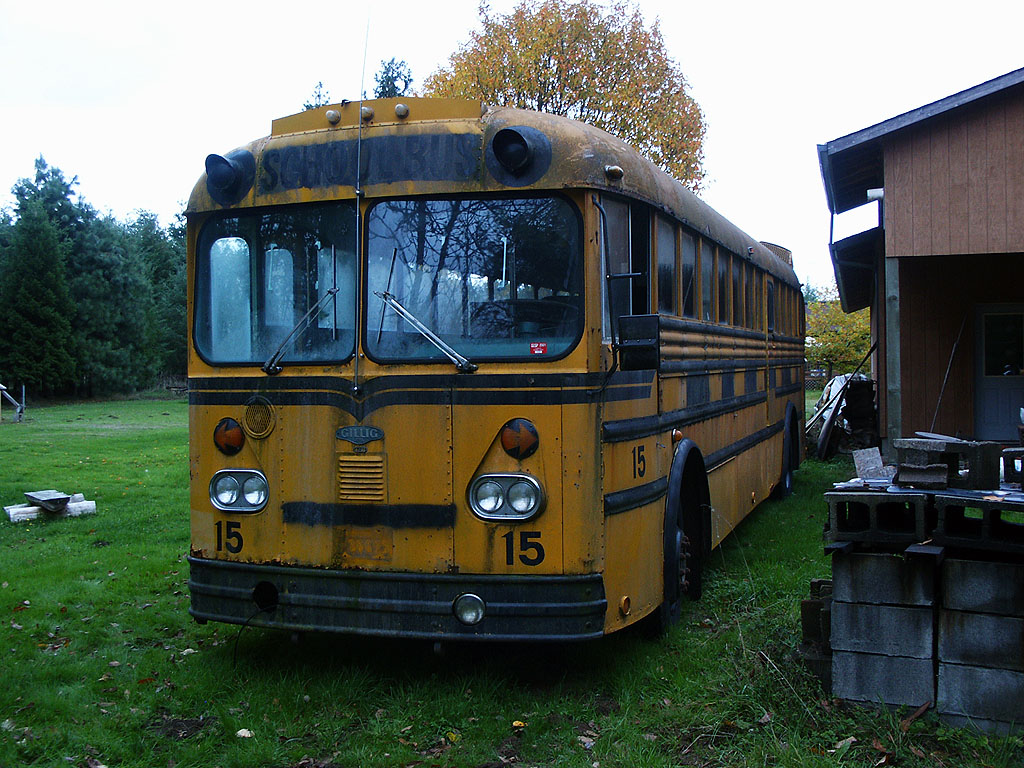
1971 Gillig Transit Coach Model C-190D (retired)

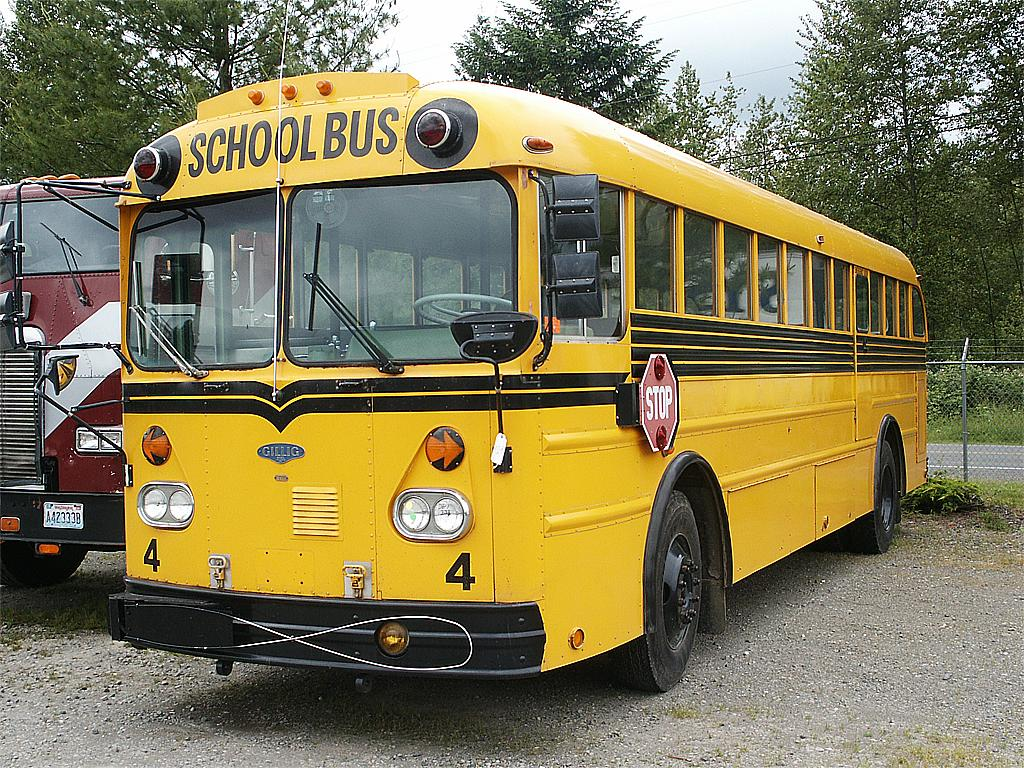
1973 Model 318D (retired)

=== 1977–1982 ===
In April 1977, federal safety standards went into effect in the United States, intended to improve the crashworthiness and structural integrity of school buses. In compliance, manufacturers had to produce stronger bodies to better survive crashes and rollovers, seats had to adopt compartmentalization as a passive restraint system. While largely unchanged from the outside, from 1977 onward, the Transit Coach adopted high-back padded seats; the largest model offered now seated 90 passengers instead of 97 (as the padded seats took up more interior space).

During 1979 production, Gillig made the first visible exterior revisions to the Transit Coach since the company purchased the Pacific product line in 1957. In a major change, the windows were changed from a drop-sash configuration to a larger split-sash design (used on all school buses except the Crown Supercoach), the guard rails on the side of the bus were revised for the first time, as the guard rail below the windows matches the two on the lower body, replacing the previous set of four (used since the 1940s).

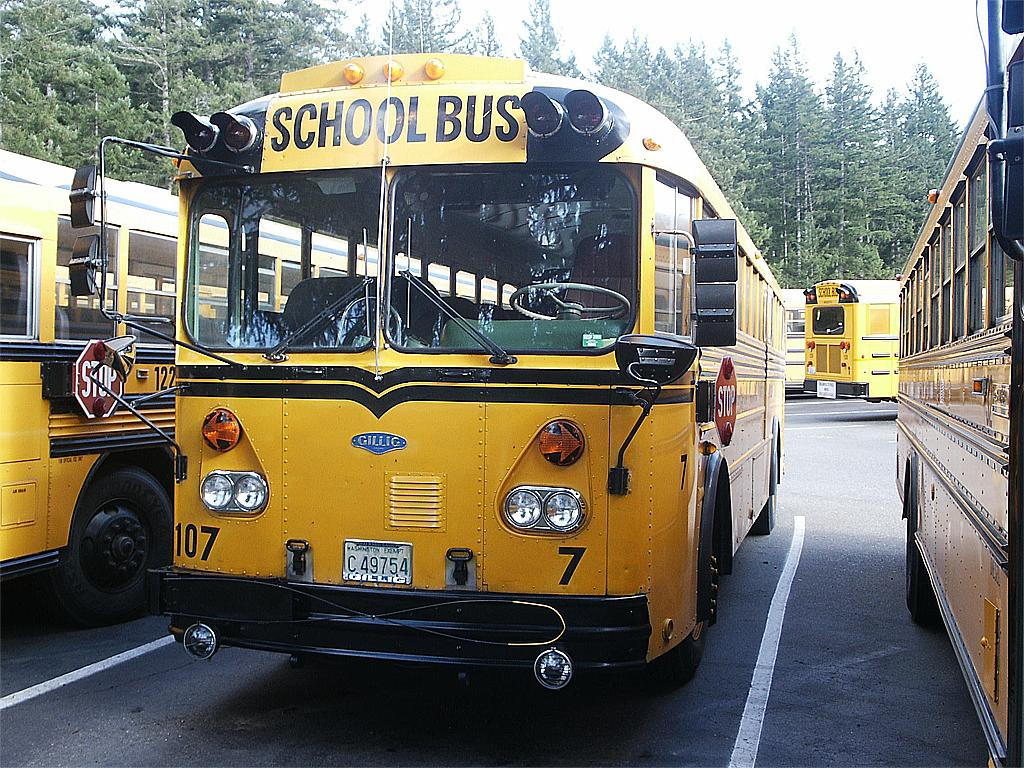
1979 Gillig Transit Coach Model VTF555D

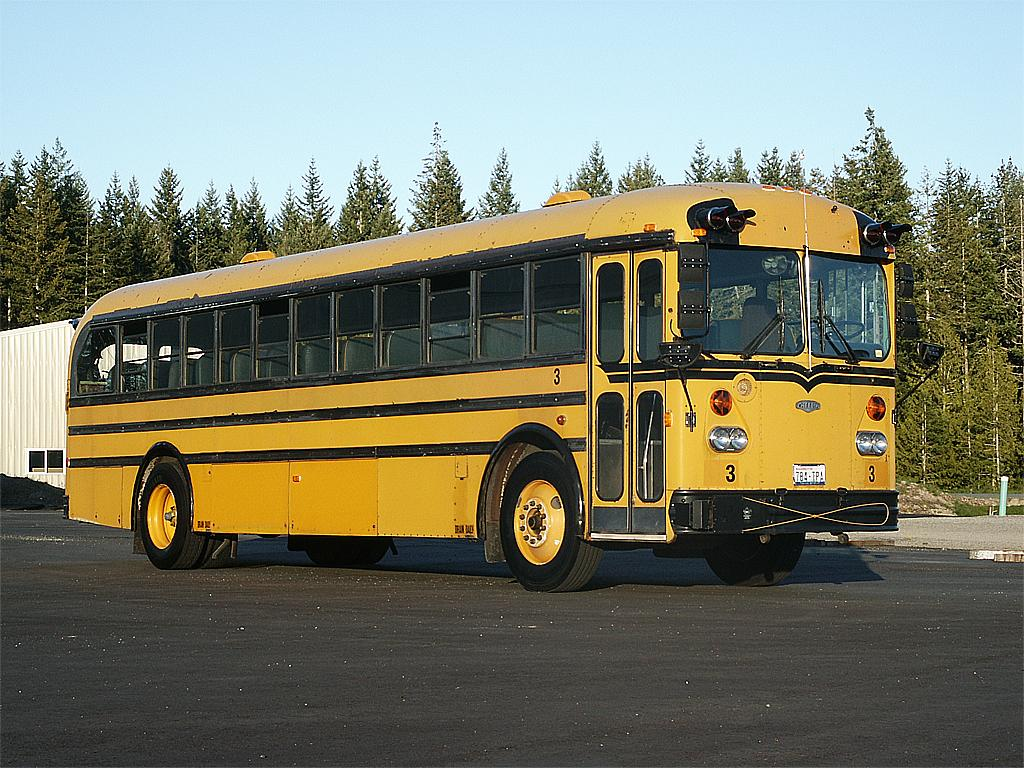
1979 Gillig Transit Coach Model 636D-12

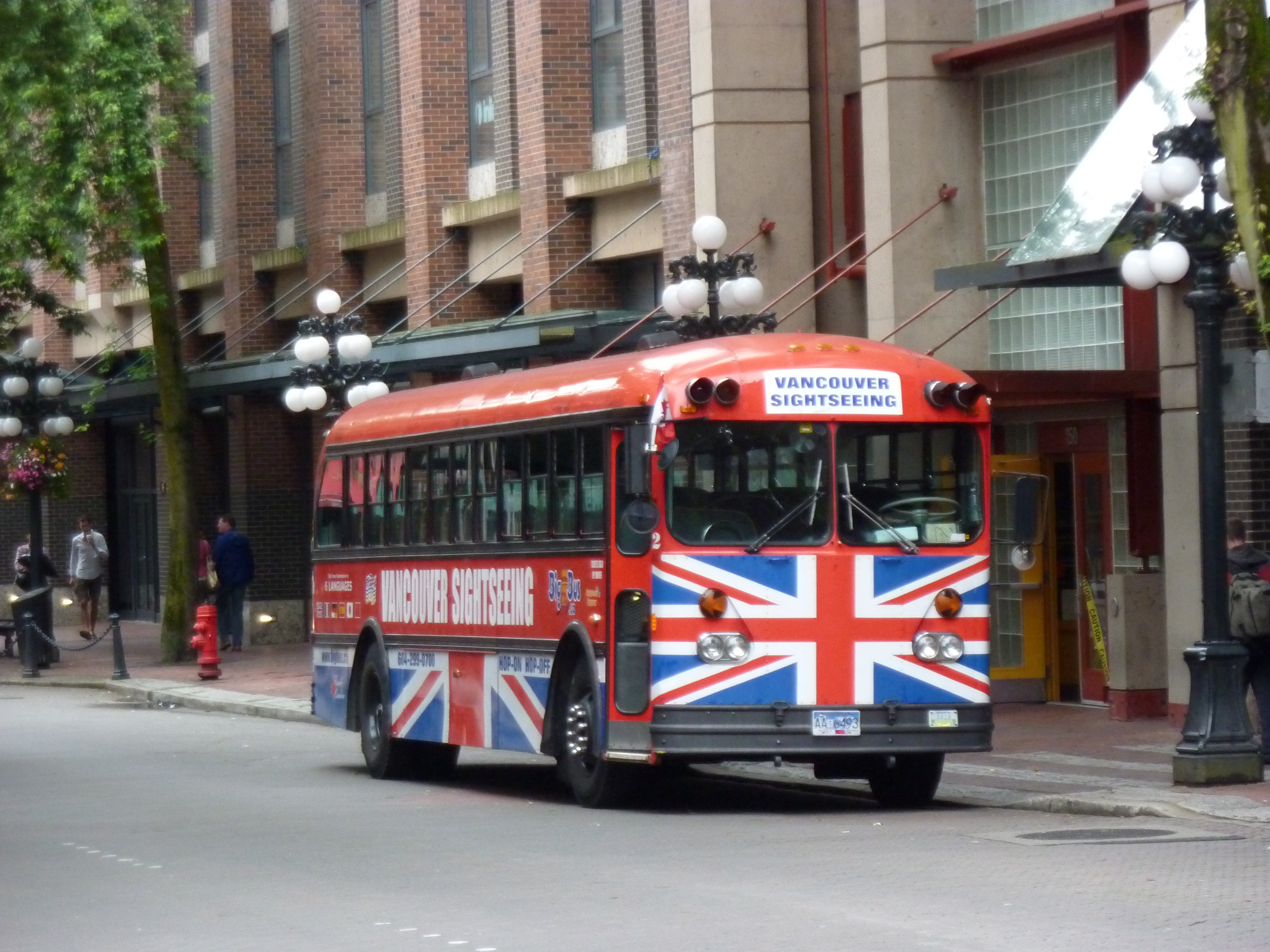
1980–1982 Gillig Transit Coach as tourist bus in Vancouver, BC, Canada.

=== Discontinuation ===
For the school bus industry as a whole, the early 1980s was a period of struggle. At the same time Gillig had facelifted the Transit Coach, two East Coast manufacturers (Superior and Ward) had closed their doors; several others were also struggling financially. Alongside the recession economy, student population growth had largely plateaued, as the entire Baby Boom generation was past the age of secondary education. Gillig Corporation, as a fairly niche manufacturer, saw its school bus sales drop off significantly; in 1980, the company ended production of the Gillig Coach conventional entirely.

In the late 1970s, Gillig launched efforts to diversify its product line; after a joint venture with Neoplan, the company developed its own mass-transit bus, leading to the Gillig Phantom in 1980. In 1982, the company chose to concentrate on mass-transit production, ending production of the Transit Coach after a 42-year production run. In 1986, a successor to the Transit Coach was introduced as Gillig launched a school bus variant of the Phantom; the Phantom school bus was withdrawn in 1993.

== Production ==
Through the production of the Transit Coach, Gillig used the following numbering system to designate school bus models.

=== Body configuration ===
C-Type C (conventional)

D-Type D (Transit Coach)

T-Tandem rear axle

"#"-Number of rows of seats (maximum 16 before 4/1/1977, 15 after 4/1/1977)

Example: 426DT15= A Transit Coach with 15 rows of seats, tandem rear axles, and a 6N71 Detroit Diesel engine.

Depending on engine type, Transit Coaches were sold in 28' (only with gasoline engines), 30', 35', 37', and 40' body lengths. The two longest body lengths only were sold with a diesel engine (the 37' could not be ordered as a 318D, a C-Series, or a VTF555-D).

=== Powertrain ===
Gillig Transit Coach powertrain details (c.1950–1982)
Diesel engines						Transmission
Gillig model code	Engine	Configuration	Production	Engine fitment	Notes	Transmission
636D	Caterpillar 1160 Caterpillar 3208	636 cu in (10.4 L) V8 636 cu in (10.4 L) turbocharged V8	1970–1982	Rear		Spicer 6252 5-speed manual Fuller T905 5-speed manual Fuller RT610 10-speed manual Allison MT643 4-speed automatic Allison MT644 4-speed automatic Allison HT740 4-speed automatic
C-160D C-170D C-180D C-190D	Cummins C-160 C-170 C-180 C-190	464 cu in (7.6 L) inline-6	1959–1974 (C160) 1959–1976 (C170/C180/C190)	Rear	Distinguished by roof-mounted external air intake (designed by Kenworth)	Spicer 6252 5-speed manual Fuller T905 5-speed manual Fuller RT610 10-speed manual Allison MT643 4-speed automatic Allison MT644 4-speed automatic Allison HT740 4-speed automatic
743D 743DT	Cummins NHH	743 cu in (12.2 L) inline-6 743 cu in (12.2 L) turbocharged inline-6	1959–1973 (743)	Midship	DT=Mid-engine tandem	Spicer 6252 5-speed manual Fuller T905 5-speed manual Fuller RT610 10-speed manual Allison MT643 4-speed automatic Allison MT644 4-speed automatic Allison HT740 4-speed automatic
855D 855DT	Cummins NHH	855 cu in (14.0 L) inline-6 855 cu in (14.0 L) turbocharged inline-6	1974–1982 (855)	Midship	DT=Mid-engine tandem Largest-displacement engine ever fitted in a school bus (as of 2020 production)	Spicer 6252 5-speed manual Fuller T905 5-speed manual Fuller RT610 10-speed manual Allison MT643 4-speed automatic Allison MT644 4-speed automatic Allison HT740 4-speed automatic
VTF555D VTF555DT (tandem)	Cummins VTF555	555 cu in (9.1 L) V8	1975–1982	Rear	VTF555DT is the only rear-engine tandem-axle school bus ever built	Spicer 6252 5-speed manual Fuller T905 5-speed manual Fuller RT610 10-speed manual Allison MT643 4-speed automatic Allison MT644 4-speed automatic Allison HT740 4-speed automatic
318D	Detroit Diesel 6V53	318 cu in (5.2 L) V6	1971–1977	Rear		Spicer 6252 5-speed manual Fuller T905 5-speed manual Fuller RT610 10-speed manual Allison MT643 4-speed automatic Allison MT644 4-speed automatic Allison HT740 4-speed automatic
426D 426DT	Detroit Diesel 6N71	426 cu in (7.0 L) inline-6 426 cu in (7.0 L) turbocharged inline-6	1976–1982	Midship	426DT=Mid-engine tandem	Spicer 6252 5-speed manual Fuller T905 5-speed manual Fuller RT610 10-speed manual Allison MT643 4-speed automatic Allison MT644 4-speed automatic Allison HT740 4-speed automatic
Gasoline engines						Spicer 6252 5-speed manual Fuller T905 5-speed manual Fuller RT610 10-speed manual Allison MT643 4-speed automatic Allison MT644 4-speed automatic Allison HT740 4-speed automatic
Gillig model code	Engine	Configuration	Production	Engine fitment	Notes	Spicer 6252 5-speed manual Fuller T905 5-speed manual Fuller RT610 10-speed manual Allison MT643 4-speed automatic Allison MT644 4-speed automatic Allison HT740 4-speed automatic
534D	Ford Super Duty V8	534 cu in (8.8 L) OHV V8	1958–1974	Rear	Final gasoline engine used in Transit Coach	Spicer 6252 5-speed manual Fuller T905 5-speed manual Fuller RT610 10-speed manual Allison MT643 4-speed automatic Allison MT644 4-speed automatic Allison HT740 4-speed automatic
590D	Hall-Scott 590	590 cu in (9.7 L) SOHC inline-6	1954–1959	Rear		Spicer 6252 5-speed manual Fuller T905 5-speed manual Fuller RT610 10-speed manual Allison MT643 4-speed automatic Allison MT644 4-speed automatic Allison HT740 4-speed automatic
501	International Harvester RD-501 ("Red Diamond")	501 cu in (8.2 L) OHV inline-6	c.1950–1959	Rear		Spicer 6252 5-speed manual Fuller T905 5-speed manual Fuller RT610 10-speed manual Allison MT643 4-speed automatic Allison MT644 4-speed automatic Allison HT740 4-speed automatic

Timeline of Gillig Transit Coach Production (1950–1985)
Bus Type	1950s										1960s										1970s										1980s
Bus Type	'50	'51	'52	'53	'54	'55	'56	'57	'58	'59	'60	'61	'62	'63	'64	'65	'66	'67	'68	'69	'70	'71	'72	'73	'74	'75	'76	'77	'78	'79	'80	'81	'82
Gasoline Engine	501
Gasoline Engine					590D
Gasoline Engine									534D
Caterpillar Engines																					636D
Cummins Engines										C-160D
Cummins Engines										C-180D
Cummins Engines										C-190D
Cummins Engines										743D/DT															855D/DT
Cummins Engines																										VTF555D/DT
Detroit Diesel Engines																						318D
Detroit Diesel Engines																											426D/DT

== See also ==
- Crown Supercoach – similar California-manufactured school bus
- Kenworth – manufacturer of Kenworth-Pacific buses (sold product rights and tooling to Gillig)
- Blue Bird All American
- Thomas Saf-T-Liner
