= Gillig Phantom =

Series of buses produced by Gillig Corporation, United States from 1980 to 2008

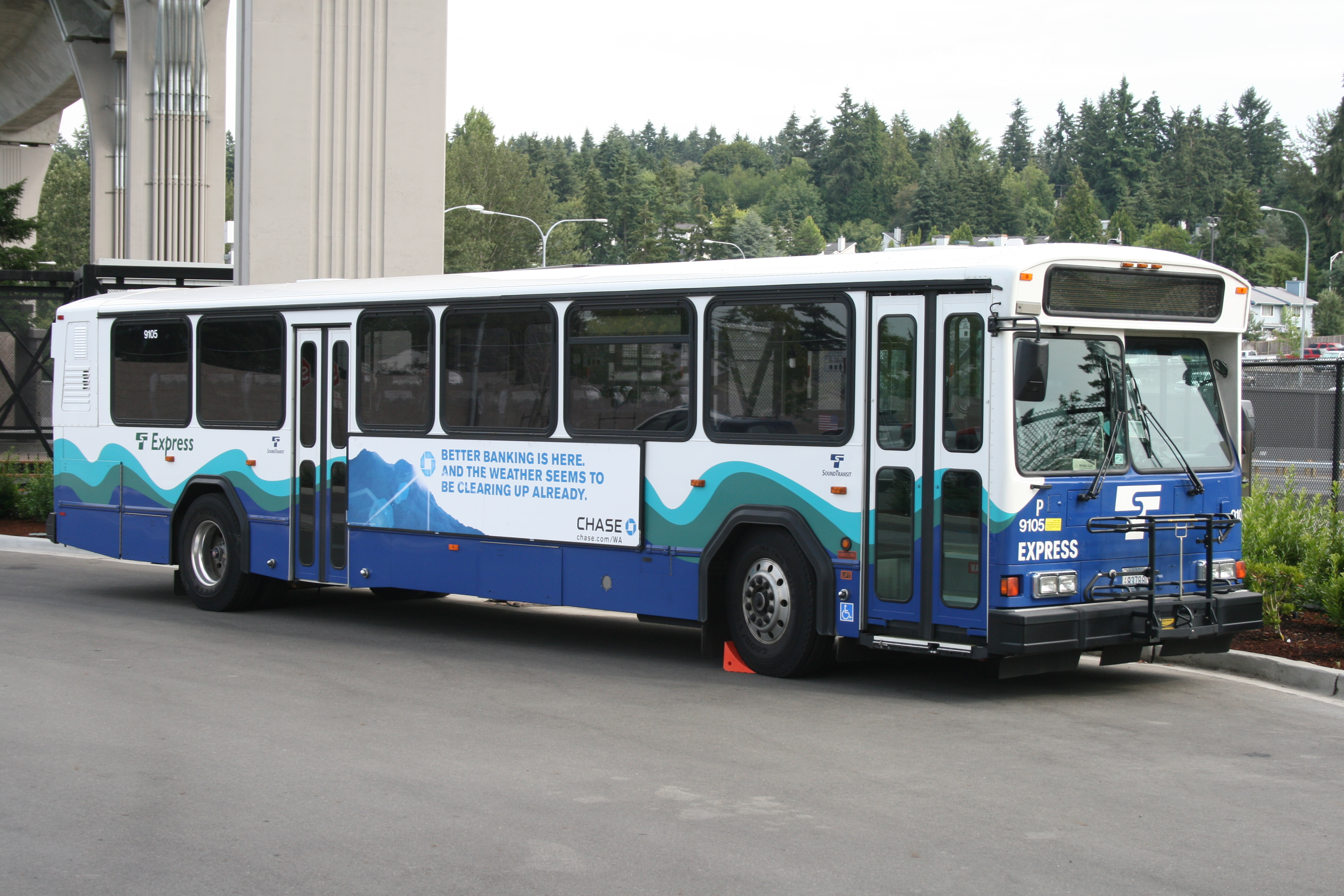
- 2008 Phantom operated by Sound Transit; one of the final examples built.

Overview
- Type: Bus
- Manufacturer: Gillig Corporation
- Production: 1980–2008
- Assembly: United States: Hayward, California

Body and chassis
- Class: Transit bus; School bus
- Doors: 1 door (school bus and sometimes 30'); 2 door (35', 40' and sometimes 30')
- Floor type: High floor, step entrance
- Chassis: Semi-monocoque

Powertrain
- Engine: Caterpillar; Cummins; Detroit Diesel
- Capacity: 78–84 passengers (school bus configuration)

Dimensions
- Length: 30–40 ft (9.1–12.2 m)
- Width: 96–102 in (2,438–2,591 mm)

Chronology
- Predecessor: Gillig Transit Coach
- Successor: Gillig Low Floor

The Gillig Phantom is a series of buses that was produced by an American manufacturer Gillig Corporation in Hayward, California. The successor to the long-running Gillig Transit Coach model line, the Phantom marked the transition of Gillig from a producer of yellow school buses to that of transit buses. The first transit bus assembled entirely by Gillig (from 1977 to 1979, the company assembled a few buses in a joint venture with Neoplan), the Phantom was produced exclusively as a high-floor bus (with step entrance).

As operator needs shifted towards low-entry buses in North America, Gillig introduced the Gillig H2000LF/Low Floor. Initially produced alongside the Low Floor, in 2008, Gillig ended production of the Phantom to concentrate entirely on low-floor bus production. The final Gillig Phantom was produced in September 2008, with the final examples acquired by Sound Transit.

== Model overview ==
Across its production, the Gillig Phantom was produced in three primary configurations. Alongside the standard transit bus, Gillig offered a suburban configuration (fitted with forward-facing seats) and the Gillig Phantom School Bus (adapted for school bus use).

=== Transit bus ===
When introduced in 1980, the Gillig Phantom was offered in a single configuration: a 96-inch width and a 35-foot body length. For 1981, additional 30-foot and 40-foot lengths were introduced; in 1983, a 102-inch body width entered production. From 2005 onward, only the 102-inch-wide version was available due to stricter emissions and accessibility requirements.

Transit versions of the Phantom were produced with a front entrance door and a mid-ship entrance door; two configurations of the latter were available. Transit operators typically opted for the standard width, while the wider version was specified by airport shuttle operators and rental car agencies. For either entrance, a wheelchair lift (integrated into the step entrance) was available as an option; if specified for the rear entrance, the wider width was configured.

During its production, the exterior of the Phantom saw little change. Dual or quad headlights were offered (with the latter becoming the most common on transit buses). While a mandatory design feature on the Phantom School Bus, a rear window was a rare option for transit/suburban Phantoms; Monterey-Salinas Transit and King County Metro are the only two transit authorities known to have ordered Phantoms with a rear window. On transit/suburban versions, several window configurations were offered; fixed side windows were a rarely ordered option. Both TheBus (Honolulu) and Sound Transit Express (for their 2008 Phantoms) had non-opening windows as part of their orders.

==== Suburban version ====
The suburban version of the Phantom transit bus was offered throughout its production. Distinguished by forward facing seats (rather than perimeter seating and standee provisions), these versions were configured for longer routes. In one configuration, the mid-ship entrance door is optional. Other options included on-board luggage racks (typically mounted above the seats).

1980-2008 Gillig Phantom, transit/suburban buses

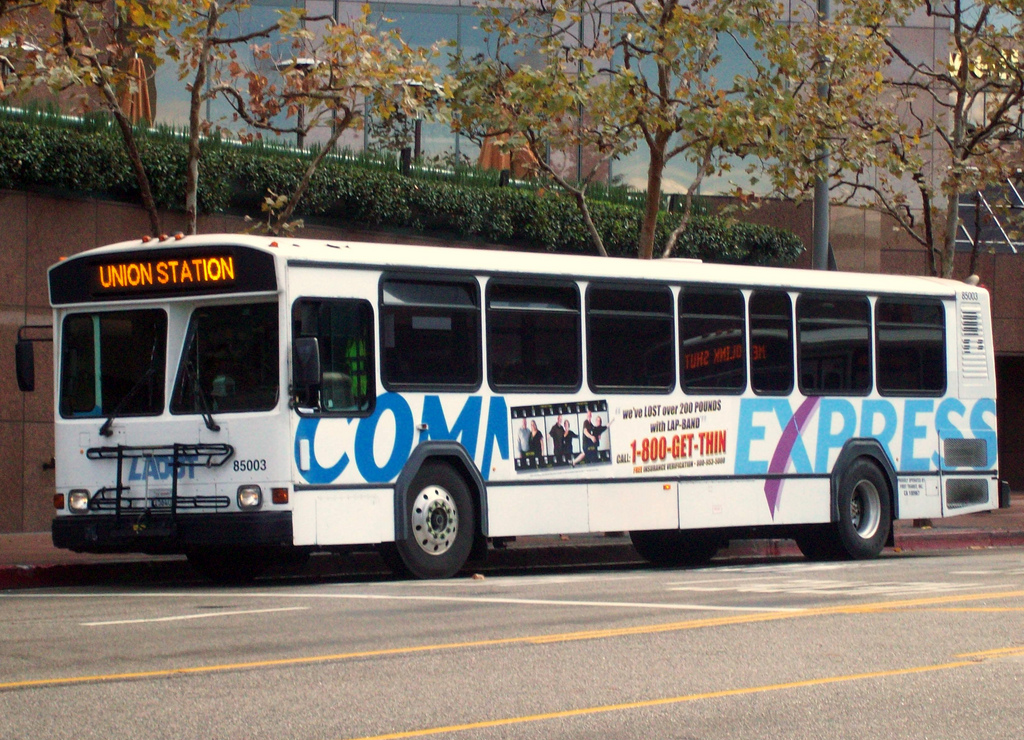
1985 Gillig Phantom of LADOT (Los Angeles, California)

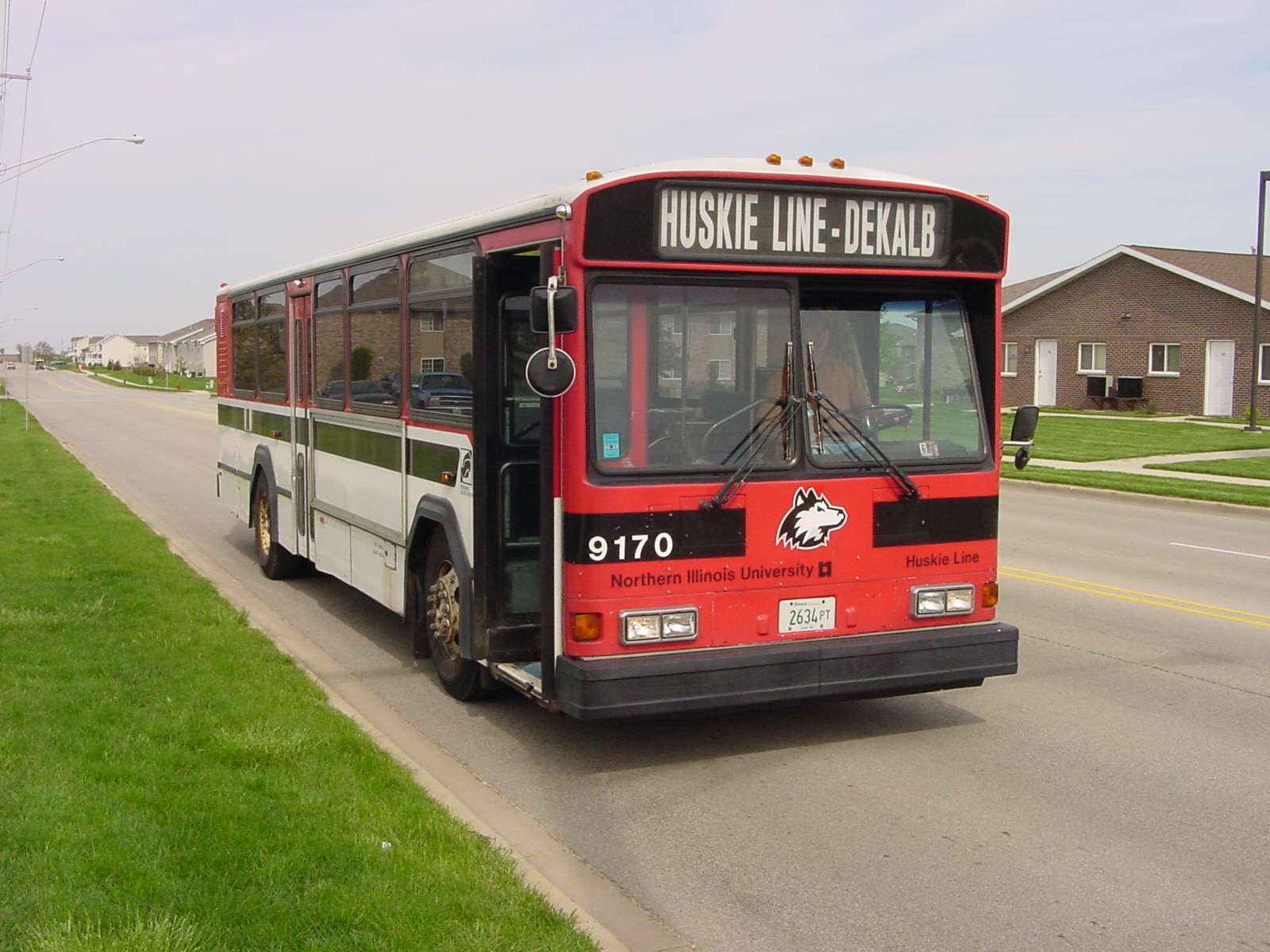
1991 Gillig Phantom of Northern Illinois University (DeKalb, Illinois)

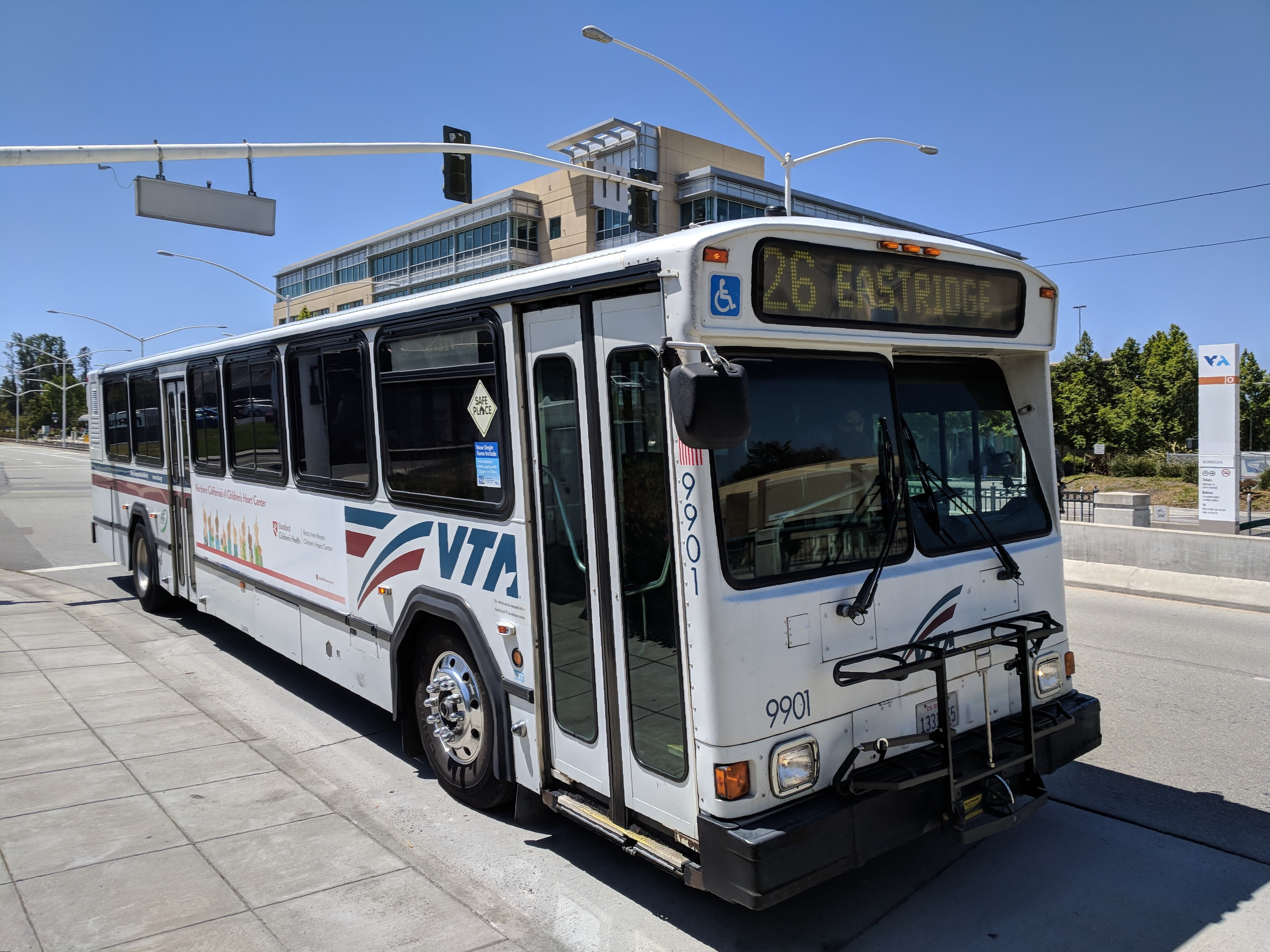
1999 Gillig Phantom of Santa Clara Valley Transportation Authority (Sunnyvale, California)

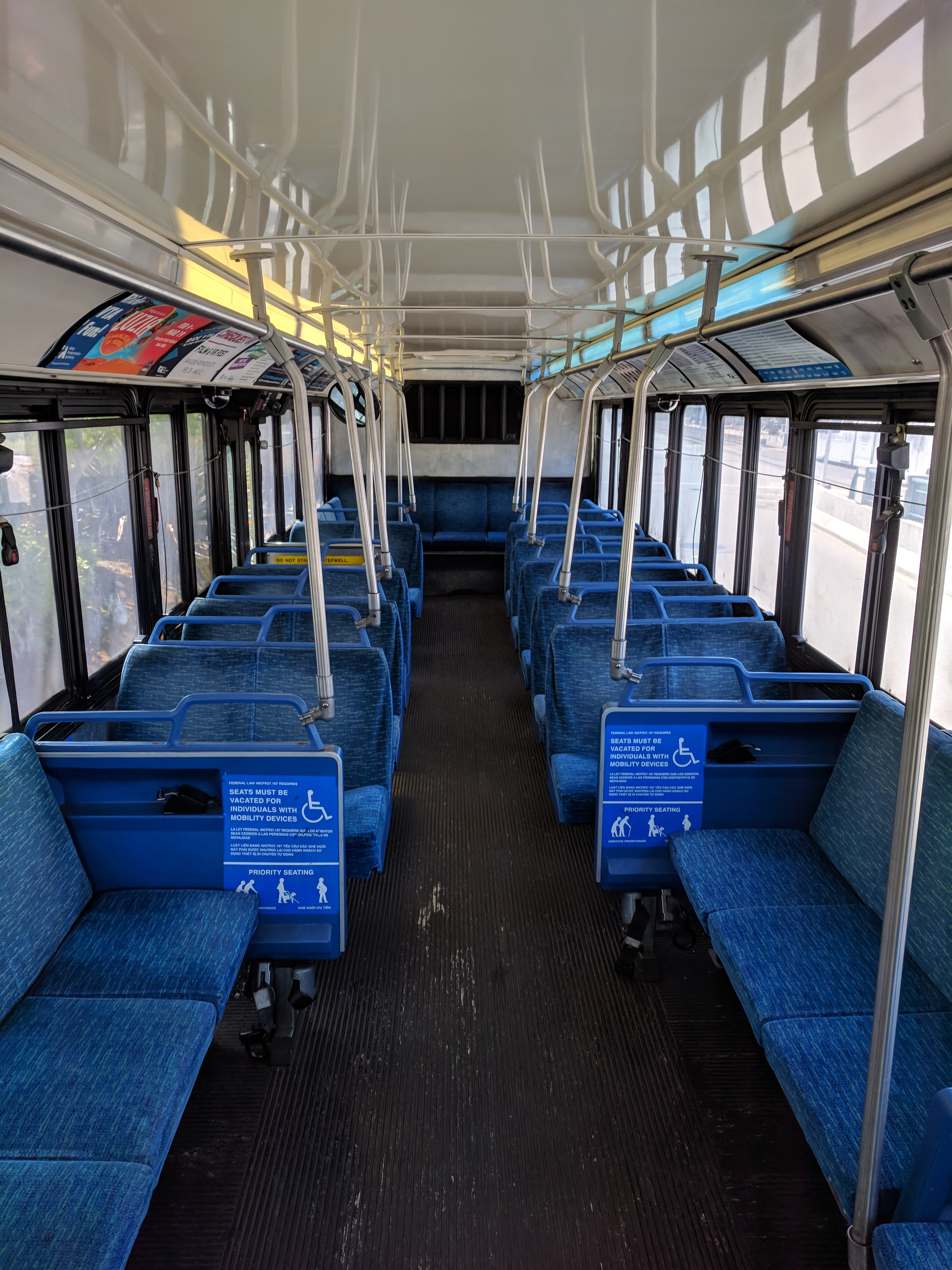
Interior view, 1999 Gillig Phantom of Santa Clara Valley Transportation Authority (Sunnyvale, California)

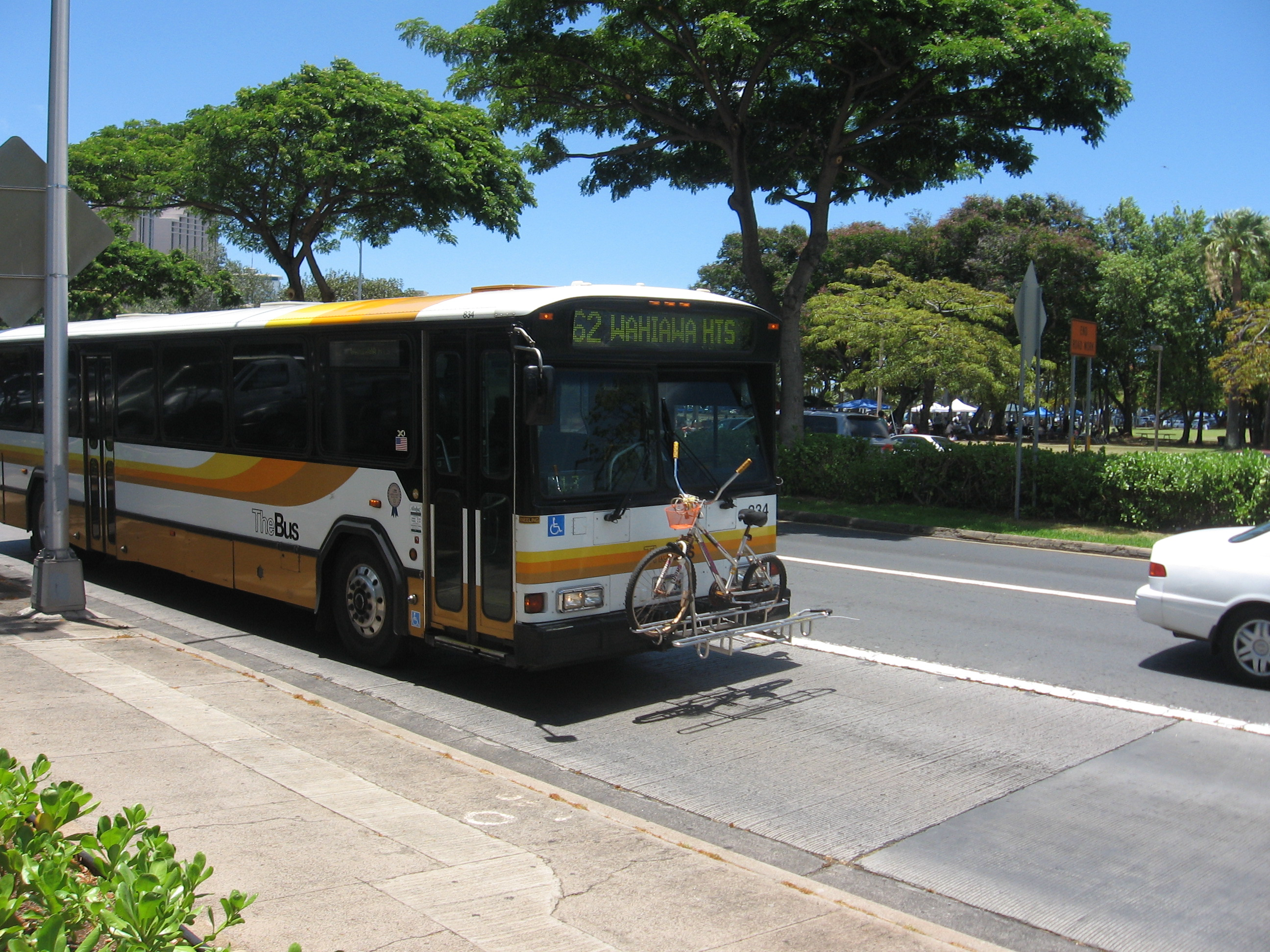
2000 Gillig Phantom of TheBus (Honolulu, Hawaii); these buses featured non-opening windows.

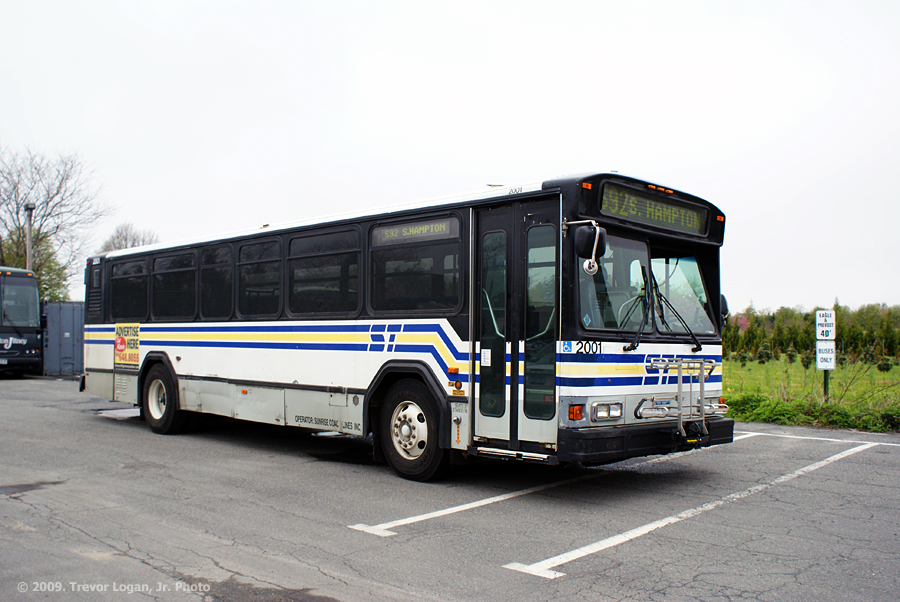
2001 Gillig Phantom (suburban configuration) of Suffolk County Transit (Long Island, New York)

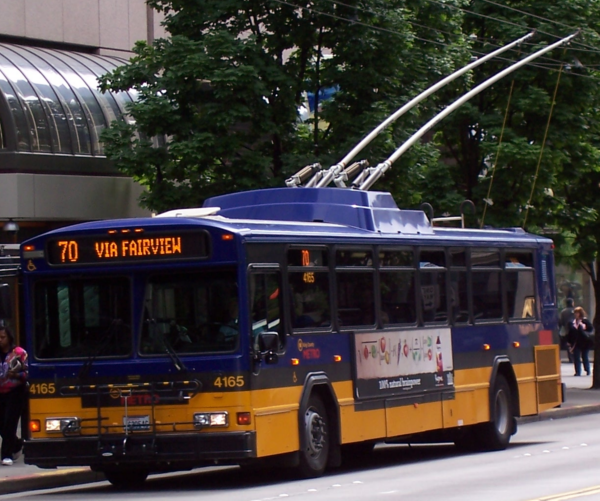
2001-2003 Gillig Phantom trolleybus of King County Metro (Seattle, Washington)

=== School bus (1986-1993) ===
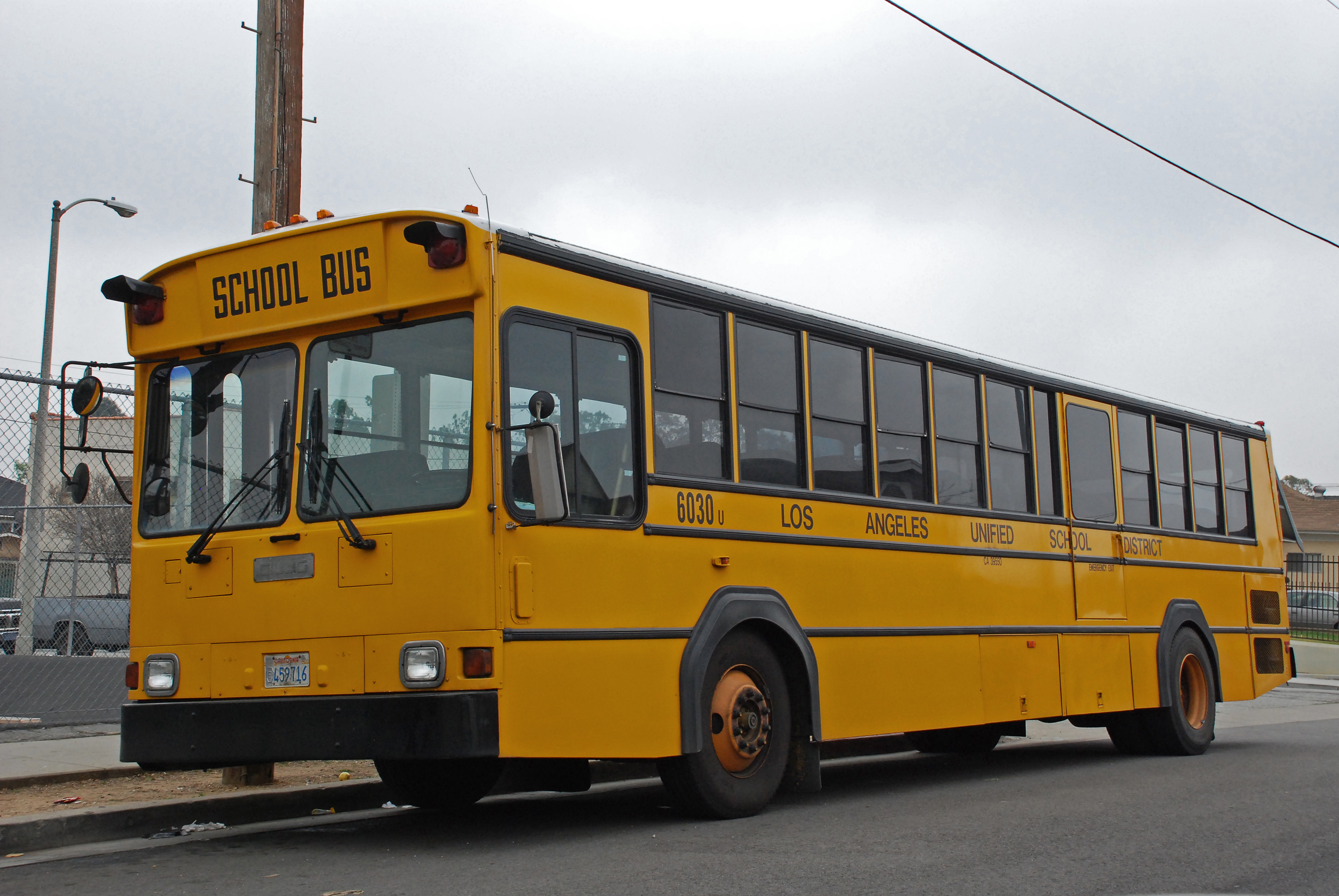
Gillig Phantom school bus of Los Angeles Unified School District (California)

For 1986, Gillig introduced the Phantom School Bus, replacing the Transit Coach School Bus that the company discontinued in 1982. The first fully redesigned Gillig school bus in 46 years, the Phantom school bus was derived directly from its mass-transit namesake. Again competing against the Crown Supercoach, Gillig concentrated sales of the model line to operators on the West Coast, though it was available across the United States. As school bus production became increasingly competitive in the early 1990s (leading Crown Coach to close its doors), Gillig ended production of the Phantom School Bus after 1993, ending over half a century of school bus assembly.

The Phantom School Bus was offered in two body lengths during its production: 37 feet (78 passenger capacity) and 40 feet (84 or 87 passenger capacity). At the time, federal regulations did not permit the use of a 102-inch body width for school buses, so the vehicle used the narrower 96-inch body (discontinued in 2004). As a consequence of using the new-generation design, Gillig was forced to abandon the mid-engine engine option offered by its Transit Coach predecessor.

For its 1986 introduction, Gillig offered the Phantom School Bus a range of diesel engines, including the Caterpillar 3208 V8 (school buses were largely the only Phantoms with this engine) and the Detroit Diesel 6V92TA (replacing the 6V71 from the Transit Coach). The Phantom school bus was available with several transmission choices, all of which were carried over from the Transit Coach: the Allison MT-643 and MT-647 4-speed automatics; the MT-654CR 5-speed automatic; and the heavier-duty HT-747 automatic. For school districts with mountainous terrain, the Phantom offered two manual transmission options: the Fuller Roadranger RT6610 and RT11610 10-speeds.

==== Design modifications ====
In converting the mass-transit Phantom into a school bus, Gillig made a number of design changes to exterior and interior to comply with school bus design standards at both state and federal levels. While the most visible changes were the standardization of school bus yellow exterior paint and the interior fitment of forward-facing, high-back padded school bus seats, the conversion brought a number of other changes to the design of the Phantom.

On the forward section of the body, the windshield was modified, with both panes of the glass becoming vertically mounted; dual headlights were standard equipment (with quad headlamps as an option). The roof caps were slightly modified, with painted "School Bus" lettering replacing the destination sign. To bring the vehicle in compliance with design regulations, the Phantom School Bus was fitted with larger sideview mirrors, convex mirrors and front cross-view mirrors. In the rear, the body was fitted with a rear window (serving as a rear emergency exit), along with a left-side emergency-exit door (a requirement for all rear-engine school buses).

To give the school bus traffic priority, red warning lights (and amber lights, for Phantom school buses sold outside of California) were fitted in the front and rear roof caps along with a side stop arm.

A number of design changes were focused on the body structure, with several revisions necessitated to bring the Phantom in compliance with school bus regulations. As the vehicle was not intended for transit routes, the rear curbside exit was deleted. The large fixed windows with top ventilation were replaced with narrower split-sash windows. To reinforce the body structure, two full-length steel rails were added below the window line; unlike most school buses of the time, the internal structure of the Phantom was additionally reinforced above the window line as well. The transit-style wheelchair lift was deleted from the stepwell in favor of a fixed structure; as a result, the entry door of the Phantom School Bus was several inches narrower than its mass-transit counterpart (a side wheelchair lift was not built as a factory-produced option). The front kneeling feature from the mass-transit Phantom was retained as an option, allowing a driver to lower the front step of the bus to curb level when loading/unloading passengers.

== Powertrain ==
The Phantom was originally equipped with either a Detroit Diesel 6V92TA, 6V71, or Cummins L-10 diesel engine, and was later available with either a Cummins ISB, ISC, ISL, or ISM diesel engine. The Phantom was formerly available with the Detroit Diesel Series 50 engine from 1993 until 2004 when Detroit Diesel cut production of the Series 50 engine. The Detroit Diesel Series 40 engine was available from 1995 to 2003.

A liquefied natural gas fueled version was produced beginning in 1992; it was later discontinued. A diesel-electric hybrid powered version was sold from 1996 to 2006; MTA in New York purchased a Gillig Phantom hybrid demo bus as well as diesels for MTA Long Island bus. From 2001 to 2003, King County Metro purchased 100 Gillig Phantoms to convert to trolleybuses. Purchased as "gliders" with no powertrain, the buses were fitted with the trolleybus propulsion system from its previous fleet, saving over $20 million from an all-new design.

Engine Manufacturer	Engine Model	Years Available	Notes
Caterpillar	3208; C9	3208: 1986–1990; C9: 2003–2008	3208 available almost exclusively in Phantom school buses. Only 57 transit buses were specified with this engine, all of which went to Ride On in Montgomery County, Maryland and delivered in 1989; all were 30 feet long.
Cummins	L-10; ISB; C8.3,ISC; ISL; ISM; M11	L10: 1984–1994; ISB: 1997–2008; C8.3: 1993–1998; ISC: 1998–2006; ISL: 2001–2008; M11: 1994–1998; ISM: 1999–2008	C8.3 cancelled for school buses due to Gillig's end of school bus production
Detroit Diesel	6V71,6V71TA; 6V92TA; Series 40; Series 50	6V71/6V71TA: 1980–1988; 6V92TA: 1980–1994; Series 50: 1993–2004; Series 40: 1995–2003	The Detroit Diesel 6V71 engine was available only for 30' buses while the 6V71TA was available for 30' and 35' models. 6V71 and 6V92 were available for school buses.

== See also ==
- Gillig Low Floor
- Flxible Metro
- NABI 416
- Neoplan Transliner
- Orion V
- GMC/TMC/NovaBus RTS
