= Dupont Industries =

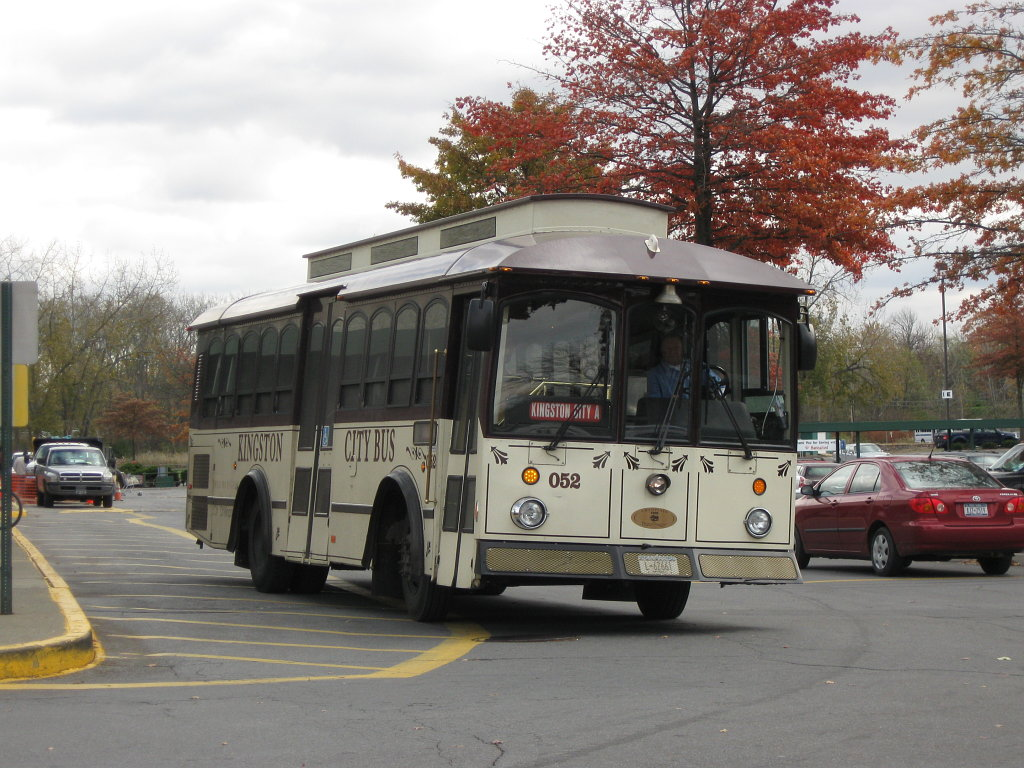
A Dupont Trolley Champlain 1608 bus in Kingston, NY.

Dupont Industries, Inc. or DuponTrolley Industries was a Canadian company specializing in the manufacture and rebuilding of buses. Based in Quebec City, it had been in business for over 60 years.

Most of Dupont's clients were in Canada and the United States.

== History ==
Dupont Industries was founded in 1997 by Jean Dupont, the owner of autobus Dupont (or Dupont Motorcoach), which was founded in 1936 by his grandfather. Dupont Industries, also known as DuponTrolley, built trolley bus replicas (mainly sold to American clients) and performed refurbishment of transit buses (mainly for Canadian clients). Dupont Motorcoach had built a heavy-duty trolley replica which received considerable attention, leading to the spin-off DuponTrolley.

== Products ==
Model	Type	Years	Notes
Victoria	transit bus		General Motors Diesel Division Buses RTS rebuild
Cartier / Classic	transit bus	2004-2005 / 1985-2005	GMDD/MCI/Nova Bus Classic rebuild
Frontenac 1672	trolley bus	2002	using Thomas Dennis Company LLC SLF35 chassis
HOX Champlain 1608	trolley bus	2002-2004	uses Thomas Blue Bird Ultra LF chassis
MVP EF Champlain 1608	low-floor/CNG trolley bus	2004	uses Thomas/NovaBus LFS chassis
Q FE	mini double decker tour bus	1998, 2007	uses Blue Bird CS bus chassis
C37	suburban coach	2000-2002	uses MCI G-series or E-series chassis
Coach 35	short coach	2000	uses MCI 102D-series chassis
TNG	truck based coach with trailer	2009-2010	uses Kenworth T-800 cab/chassis

== Clients ==
- Citroussillion
- L'aerobus
- Hamilton Street Railway
- Transport en commun La Québécoise inc
- Transdev Limocar
- Veolia Transport North America

Client list
Agency	City	State/Province
	Nelson	British Columbia
	Lodi	California
	Danbury	Connecticut
	Tallahassee	Florida
	Des Moines	Iowa
	Clinton	Iowa
	Maysville	Kentucky
	Annapolis	Maryland
	Brockton	Massachusetts
	Haverhill	Massachusetts
	Ionia	Michigan
	Minneapolis	Minnesota
	Lincoln	Nebraska
	Kingston	New York
	Winston-Salem	North Carolina
	Kingston	Ontario
	Ottawa	Ontario
	Harrisburg	Pennsylvania
	Magog	Quebec
	Montreal	Quebec
	Quebec City	Quebec
	Shawnigan	Quebec
	Gatlinburg	Tennessee
	Pigeon Forge	Tennessee
	Knoxville	Tennessee
	Kerrville	Texas
	Harrisonburg	Virginia
	Green Bay	Wisconsin
	La Crosse	Wisconsin
	Kenosha	Wisconsin
