= Transportation Manufacturing Corporation =

Defunct bus manufacturer of Roswell, New Mexico, United States

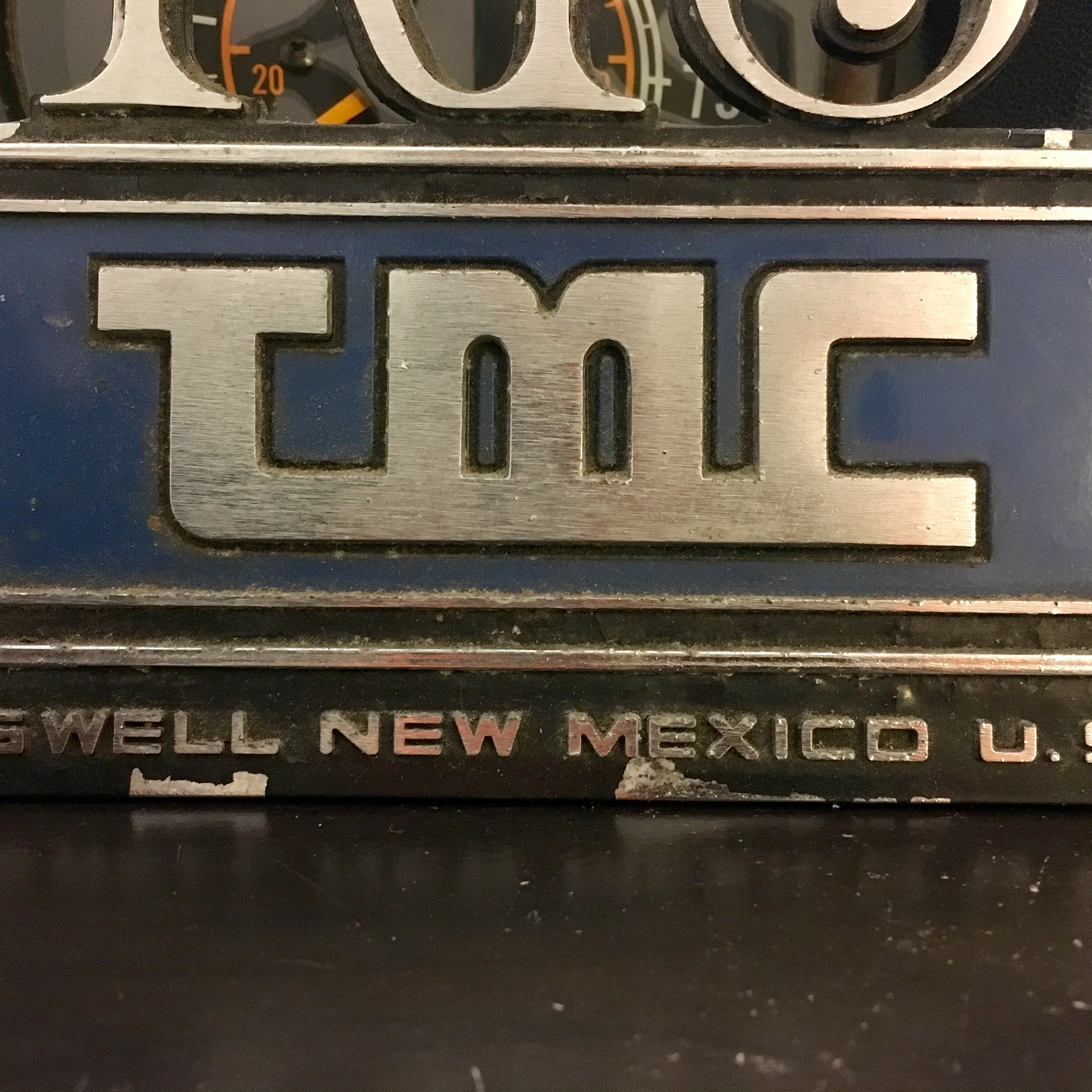
A plaque found in RTS made after the 1980s, featuring the TMC logo and the acronym "RTS"

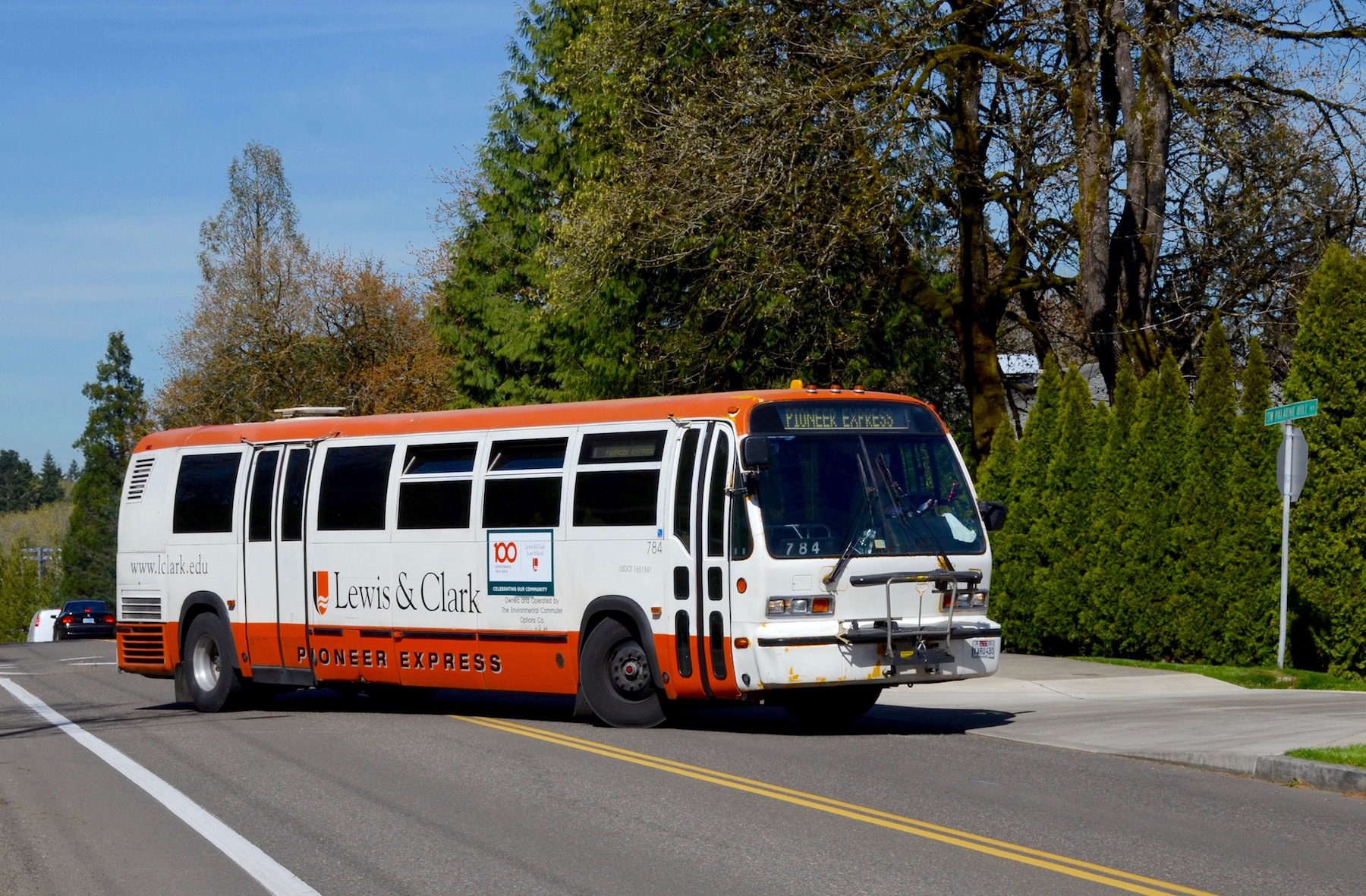
A 1994 TMC RTS bus still in service in 2016 for Lewis & Clark College, in Portland, Oregon

Transportation Manufacturing Corporation (TMC) was a bus manufacturer based in Roswell, New Mexico.

The company was formed in 1974 by Greyhound Bus Lines to manufacture Motor Coach Industries vehicles. In 1987, General Motors decided to close its bus division and sold the manufacturing rights of the Rapid Transit Series (RTS) bus and the Classic to Greyhound subsidiary, Motor Coach Industries. RTS production would move to the TMC plant in Roswell, New Mexico, while the Classic bus production would remain in the former GM bus plant in Saint-Eustache, Quebec. Motor Coach Industries sold its Classic and RTS bus license to Nova Bus in 1993. In 1990, TMC began development of an enclosed automobile-transport semitrailer. This trailer used small-diameter wheels to maximize interior space, and robotic arms to lift the automobiles and position them closely together in the trailer body. The trailer lacked the traditional ramps and racks: automobiles were fitted with pins strapped to the tires, which slotted into holders inside the trailer. These features maximized the capacity of the trailer.

In 1994, MCI sold the TMC plant to NovaBus, who closed it in 2003. The Roswell, New Mexico plant was reopened later under the name Millennium Transit Services LLC.

== Products ==
- MCI coaches: Classic line originally designed by General Motors
- Rapid Transit Series (RTS) - licensed/purchased from General Motors 1987-1994
- CityCruiser/T-30 (a modified Orion I, licensed from Ontario Bus Industries)
- Orion I from Orion Bus Industries
