= Rapid Transit Series =

American transit bus type

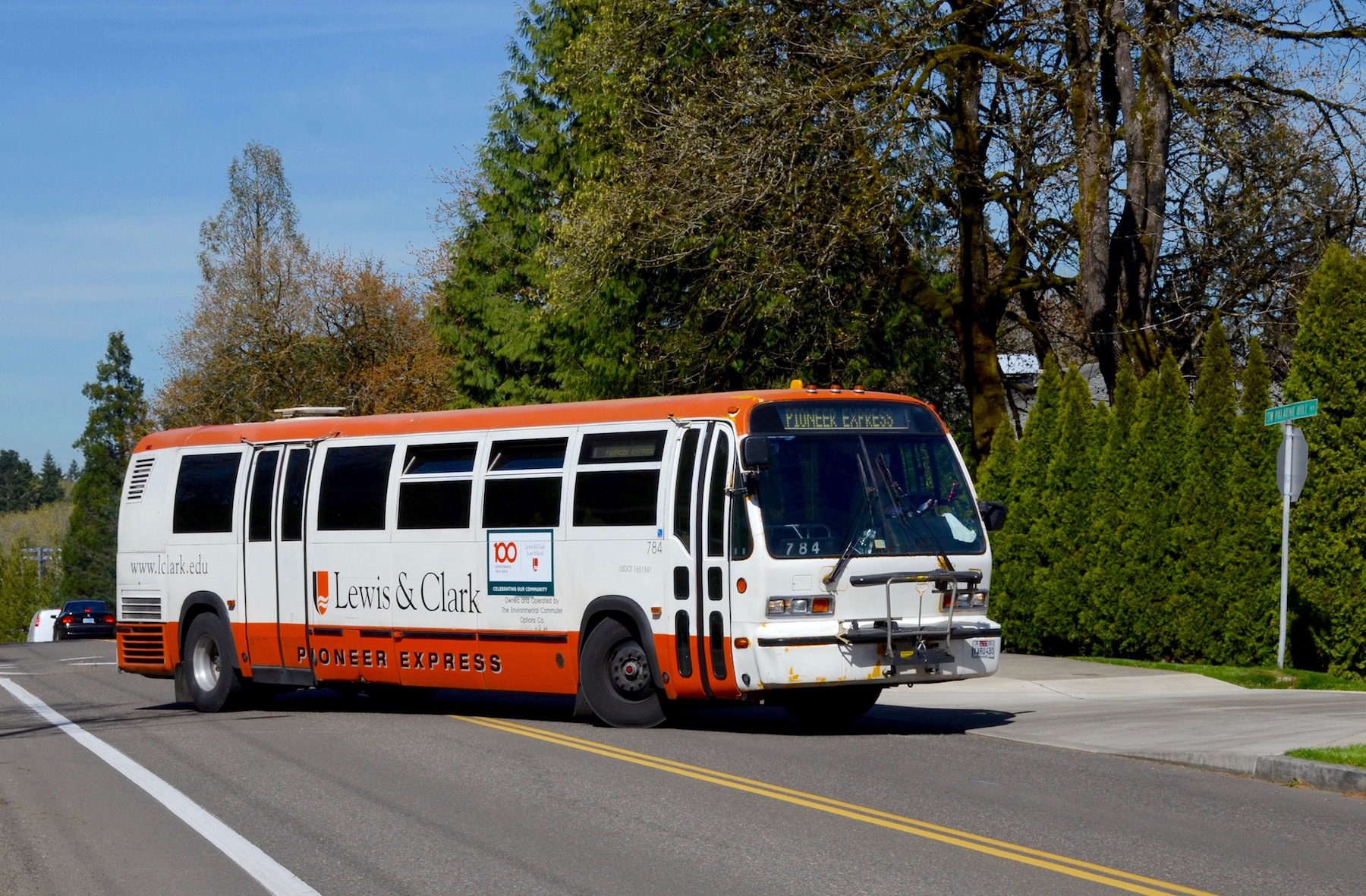
- RTS-06 model with narrow front door

Overview
- Manufacturer: GMC Truck and Coach Division (1977–1987); Motor Coach Industries (TMC) (1987–1995); Nova Bus (1995–2003); Millennium Transit Services (2006–2012)
- Production: 1977–2003, 2006–2012
- Assembly: Pontiac, Michigan (1977–1987); Roswell, New Mexico (1987–2003, 2006–2012); Saint-Eustache, Quebec (1997–2003); Niskayuna, New York (1996–2003)
- Designer: Michael Lathers

Body and chassis
- Class: City bus
- Body style: Monocoque stressed skin
- Doors: 1 door or 2 doors
- Floor type: Step entrance (RTS Legend and Express) / semi low-floor (RTS Extreme)

Powertrain
- Engine: Detroit Diesel, Cummins, or Caterpillar engines
- Transmission: Allison or ZF transmissions

Dimensions
- Wheelbase: 178 in (4.52 m), 238 in (6.05 m), or 298 in (7.57 m)
- Length: 30 ft (9.14 m), 35 ft (10.67 m), or 40 ft (12.19 m)
- Width: 96 in (2.44 m) or 102 in (2.59 m)
- Height: 119 in (3.02 m) (over roof-hatches; rooftop A/C, hybrid drive, or CNG options added to height)

Chronology
- Predecessor: GM New Look; Classic (in Canada)
- Successor: Nova Bus LF Series (when it was discontinued in 2003)

The Rapid Transit Series (RTS) city bus is a long-running series of transit buses that was originally manufactured by GMC Truck and Coach Division in Pontiac, Michigan. First produced in 1977, the RTS was GMC's offering of an Advanced Design Bus design (the other entry was the Grumman 870 by competitor Flxible) and is the descendant of GMC's prototype for the U.S. Department of Transportation's Transbus project. The RTS is notable for its then-futuristic styling featuring automobile-like curved body and window panels; the Advanced Design Buses were meant to be an interim solution between the high-floor transit buses that preceded them, such as the GMC New Look (which had a curved windshield, but flat side glass and body panels), and modern low-floor buses that would facilitate passenger boarding and accessibility. Most current buses are now made by specialized coach manufacturers with flat sides and windows.

Production of the RTS transitioned from GM to Motor Coach Industries (under its Transportation Manufacturing Corporation subsidiary in Roswell, New Mexico) in 1987, moved to Nova Bus in 1994, and finally moved to Millennium Transit Services (MTS) in 2003. Production ceased with the closing of MTS in 2012.

The RTS was offered in 30-foot (9.14 m)-, 35-foot (10.67 m)-, and 40-foot (12.19 m)-long models and was built using a modular design that allowed the same parts to be used for all three lengths, the longest of which could seat up to 47 passengers. It was originally powered by either 6- or 8-cylinder versions of Detroit Diesel's Series 71 two-stroke diesel engine channeled through an Allison V730 or ZF 5HP-500 transmission. Later models could be powered by a 6-cylinder Series 92, or the 4-cylinder Series 50 engines.

== History ==
=== Pre-production ===
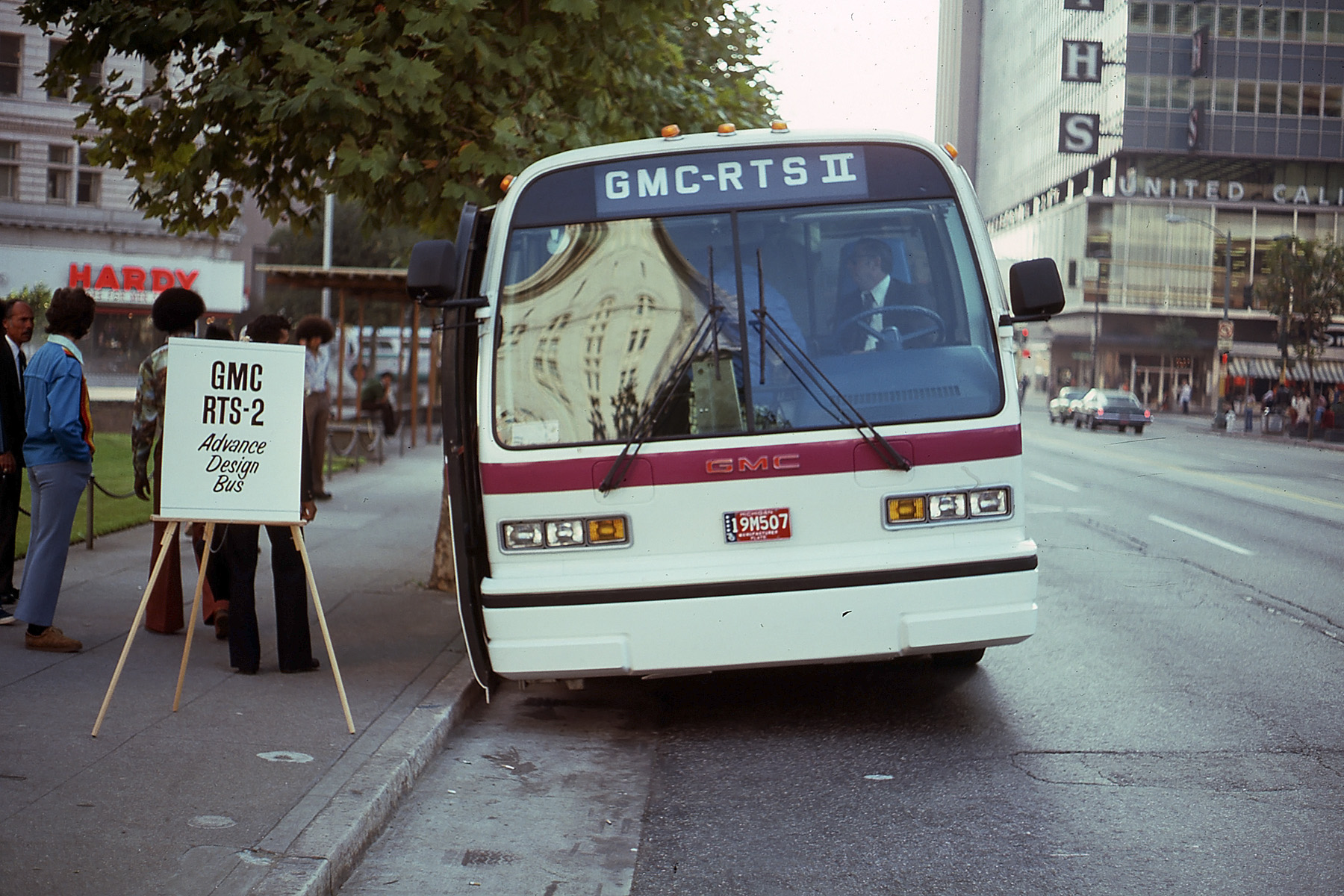
GMC RTS II pre-production model testing in Oakland, October 1976.

The RTS is the descendant of the GMC RTS-3T, its prototype built for the Transbus project; the RTS-3T was preceded by the RTX (Rapid Transit Experimental), a turbine-powered prototype produced in 1968 that had been under development since 1964. Both the RTX and the RTS-3T Transbus prototype had a similar design as the production RTS, though there were numerous detail differences, such as the prototypes having a less-rounded body design, a one-step entryway, and (in the case of the Transbus) a 45-foot (13.72 m) length. RTX used the same GT-309 gas turbine engine that had previously been fitted to the Turbo Titan III and Turbo-Cruiser II/III concept vehicles along with a "toric" continuously variable transmission. RTX also used smaller wheels and a "kneeling" suspension design to reduce first-step height by 4 1/2 in (110 mm), aiding boarding, and the interior floor height was 21 in (530 mm), 7 in (180 mm) lower than a contemporaneous "New Look" bus. However, the passenger capacity of a 40-ft bus was reduced from 50 to 29.

Wanting a backup plan in case the Transbus project was abandoned, GMC decided to modify the RTX/Transbus design and in 1970 began the RTS-II project (designating two axles) that became the earliest RTS with the first prototype being assembled in 1973 at which point the project went onto hiatus. Though closer to its predecessors than the production models, the RTS name debuted with this prototype. After the project was revived in 1974, GMC would later withdraw from the Transbus project and focus their energies on the RTS, which was billed as an Advanced Design Bus representing a "transitional" or "interim" step towards a low-floor bus to facilitate boarding and disembarking. GM announced it was ready to accept orders for the RTS in October 1975.

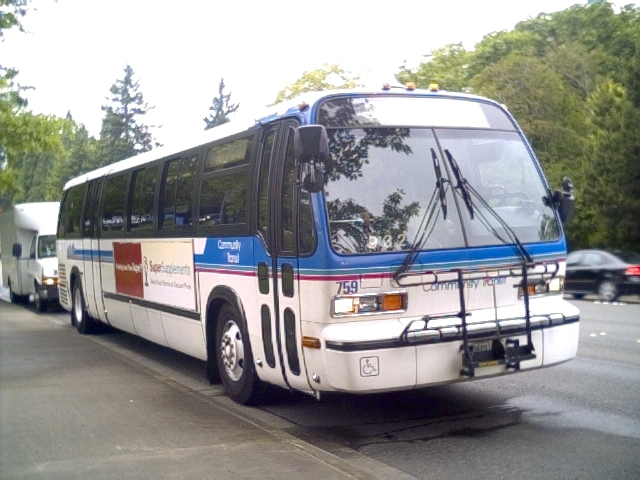
Front view

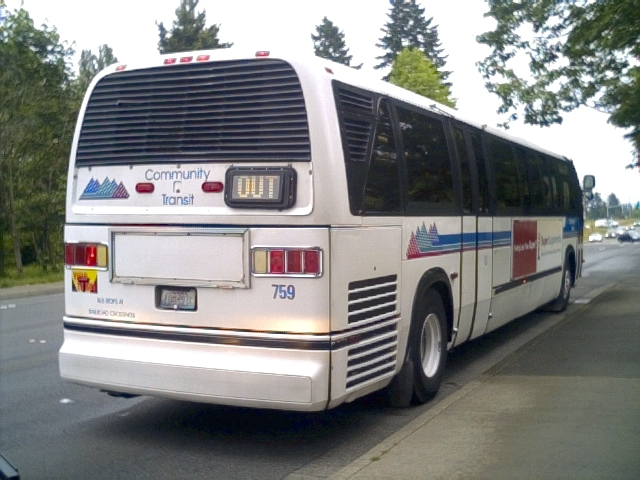
Rear view

RTS-06 bus in service with Community Transit

An RTS bus in revenue service.

=== Production ===
In September 1985 GMC announced that due to lower than expected, or poor sales of their RTS series buses, that it was in the process of trying to sell or close its transit bus building business, and then later announced that they have sold its RTS design, and patent rights, and bus manufacturing equipment and production line to Transportation Manufacturing Corporation (TMC) of Roswell, New Mexico, a subsidiary of Motor Coach Industries in May 1987, though the two companies completed a joint order for the New York City Transit Authority to prepare TMC for the production. TMC eventually sold the design and patents to Nova Bus in September 1994 in the midst of an order for the Massachusetts Bay Transportation Authority. Production under Nova Bus continued until 2002 when Nova Bus left the U.S. market and concentrated on its latest LFS low-floor design.

Production was revived, however, by Millennium Transit Services, which announced plans to manufacture the bus in both high and low-floor configurations at the shuttered TMC facilities in Roswell. However, after poor sales and failure to fulfill orders, Millennium ceased production on the RTS and went out of business in 2009. In September 2011, MTS re-entered the market and showcased its latest RTS product at the 2011 APTA Expo in New Orleans. It also announced plans to introduce a 42.5-foot (12.95 m) version of the standard floor RTS, which would go into production in the near future. MTS ceased to exist sometime after 2012 after failing to win any substantial bus orders, as the market for high-floor buses (using rear door mounted wheelchair lifts) had essentially vanished by that point; transit agencies had turned to New Flyer Industries, Orion, Gillig, Nova Bus, and NABI and their low-floor models equipped with front door wheelchair ramps.

== Models ==
Through the history of the RTS, there have been six generations of production plus two experimental variants (one of which not having made it beyond the prototype stage).

- RTS-01 (1977–78): Produced for a consortium of agencies in California, Massachusetts, and Texas led by Houston, the RTS-01 was similar to the replacement RTS-03 only with some minor differences and a different style bumper.
- RTS-03 (1978–80): The first mass-produced version of the RTS that gained popularity among transit authorities.
- RTS-04 (1981–86): Introduced in the early 1980s, due to the popularity of air conditioning, and engine overheating failures of the earlier series RTS buses, the RTS-04 eliminated the sloped rear end with a squared-off rear end in order to provide the necessary space to house a larger air conditioning unit away from the engine compartment. The RTS-04 also introduced a newer DD6V92T engine with turbocharger, and a more pronounced side windows (and openable) that are similar to those featured in the latest RTS buses. These and previous models use independent front suspension. Most buses are given the option of tell-tale lights on each side of the destination sign; some were offered the lights on the backplate near the rear destination sign.
  - A 55-foot (17 m), 2 60-foot (18 m), and a 65-foot (19.81 m) articulated versions known as the RTS Mega were built, but never passed the prototype status.
- RTS-05 (1987): GMC's attempt to move the RTS to a T-drive configuration, where the engine is mounted longitudinally, at a right angle to the axle. Rear module structure was heavily modified for the 'straight-in' arrangement, and would later be used as the design source for the Series 07.
- RTS-06 (1986–2002): The most common RTS found today and the only one made by three manufacturers (GMC, TMC, Nova Bus). The RTS-06 is extremely similar to the RTS-04, except for slightly different rear ends found in later models that house the Detroit Diesel Series 50 engine. The front suspension for the -06 and later models was changed to a solid beam front axle. LACMTA RTS-06 buses also had a different radiator in the back.
- RTS-07 (1992): Experimental T-drive RTS; never put into mass production. The two models that were produced were for SMART in suburban Detroit.
- RTS-08 (1989–94): Front Wheelchair equipped RTS. The Chicago Transit Authority had wanted a bus with a front wheelchair lift and a back window, and contracted TMC to create such a bus. Fifteen 96-inch (2.44 m)-wide RTS-08s were produced, all of which went to the CTA. After Nova Bus took over production, the RTS-08 was replaced by the RTS-06 WFD (Wide Front Door), which are easily differentiated by the radically different front end and the presence of a slide-glide front door.
- RTS Legend (2006–2012): The first Millennium Transit RTS, it is similar to the earlier RTS-06 with the differences of a T-drive configuration and a new front bumper. Wide-door models were reportedly available, but none were ever ordered. For a host of reasons, no more than 10 buses were built before the contracts were cancelled; rejected coaches were resold to Foxwoods Resort Casino, Somerset County Transportation, and Texas A&M University.
  - RTS Extreme (Production never started): The first semi low-floor version of the RTS.
  - RTS Express (Production never started): RTS variant for "express" suburban use, with suburban seating and other features commonly found on motorcoaches.

| Type | Length (Note: This digit refers to the number of 5-foot (1.5 m) sections welded together to make the body. Length designation moved to second digit of first group in 1979. For example, the TH-7603 (1978 designation) became the T7H-603 (1979–80 designation).) | Engine (Note: Engine codes applied to GM-built buses) | | Length | Width | Series |
|---|---|---|---|---|---|---|
| T = transit bus | 7 = 35 feet (10.7 m); 8 = 40 feet (12.2 m) | W = Detroit Diesel 6V71; H = Detroit Diesel 8V71 (Note: Not offered starting with third series (RTS-04)); J = Detroit Diesel 6V92TA (Note: Available starting with second series (RTS-03)); 0 (Note: Generic designation used by Transportation Manufacturing Corporation) | — | 7 = 35 feet (10.7 m); 8 = 40 feet (12.2 m) | 2 = 102 inches (2.59 m); 6 = 96 inches (2.44 m) | two digits |
Notes:

RTS regular production series
=== First series (RTS-01, 1977–78) ===
Description: Produced for a consortium of agencies in California, Massachusetts, and Texas; Similar to the replacement RTS-03, with some minor differences and a different style bumper
| Type | Models | Example (shown) |
| Transit | Tn-7601: 35 ft (10.7 m) × 96 in (2.44 m); Tn-8201: 40 ft (12.2 m) × 102 in (2.59 m); Tn-8601: 40 ft (12.2 m) × 96 in (2.44 m) | |
=== Second series (RTS-03, 1978–80) ===
Description: First mass-produced version of the RTS that gained popularity among transit authorities.; Modular design: seamless, un-openable side windows; sliding ("plug") front and rear doors; and a distinctive, sloped rear module.
| Type | Models | Example (shown) |
| Transit | Tn-7203/T7n-203: 35 ft (10.7 m) × 102 in (2.59 m); Tn-7603/T7n-603: 35 ft (10.7 m) × 96 in (2.44 m); Tn-8203/T8n-203: 40 ft (12.2 m) × 102 in (2.59 m); Tn-8603/T8n-603: 40 ft (12.2 m) × 96 in (2.44 m) | |
=== Third series (RTS-04, 1981–86) ===
Description: Eliminated the sloped rear end with a squared-off rear end in order to provide the necessary space to house a larger air conditioning unit away from the engine compartment.; Introduced a newer DD6V92T engine with turbocharger; More pronounced side windows (and openable) that are similar to those featured in the latest RTS buses.; Most buses are given the option of tell-tale lights on each side of the destination sign; some were offered the lights on the backplate near the rear destination sign.
| Type | Models | Example (T8J-204 shown) |
| Transit | T7n-204: 35 ft (10.7 m) × 102 in (2.59 m); T7n-604: 35 ft (10.7 m) × 96 in (2.44 m); T8n-204: 40 ft (12.2 m) × 102 in (2.59 m); T8n-604: 40 ft (12.2 m) × 96 in (2.44 m) | |
=== Fourth series (RTS-06, 1986–2002) ===
Description: Most common RTS found today and the only one made by three manufacturers (GMC, TMC, Nova Bus); Externally similar to the RTS-04, except for slightly different rear ends found in later models that house the Detroit Diesel Series 50 engine; Front suspension changed to a solid beam front axle
| Type | Models | Example (TMC T80-206 shown) |
| Transit | T7n-606: 35 ft (10.7 m) × 96 in (2.44 m); T8n-206: 40 ft (12.2 m) × 102 in (2.59 m); T8n-606: 40 ft (12.2 m) × 96 in (2.44 m) | |
=== Fifth series (RTS-08, 1989–94) ===
Description: Manufactured by TMC for Chicago Transit Authority; Distinctively "flattened" front fascia to accommodate wider front door
| Type | Models | Example (TMC T80-208 shown) |
| Transit | T70-608: 35 ft (10.7 m) × 96 in (2.44 m); T80-208: 40 ft (12.2 m) × 102 in (2.59 m); T80-608: 40 ft (12.2 m) × 96 in (2.44 m) | |
=== Sixth series (RTS Legend, 2006–12) ===
Description: Manufactured by MTS
| Type | Models | Example (shown) |
| Transit | RTS/R80 THN: 40 feet (12.2 m) × 102 inches (2.59 m) | |

=== Timeline of options ===
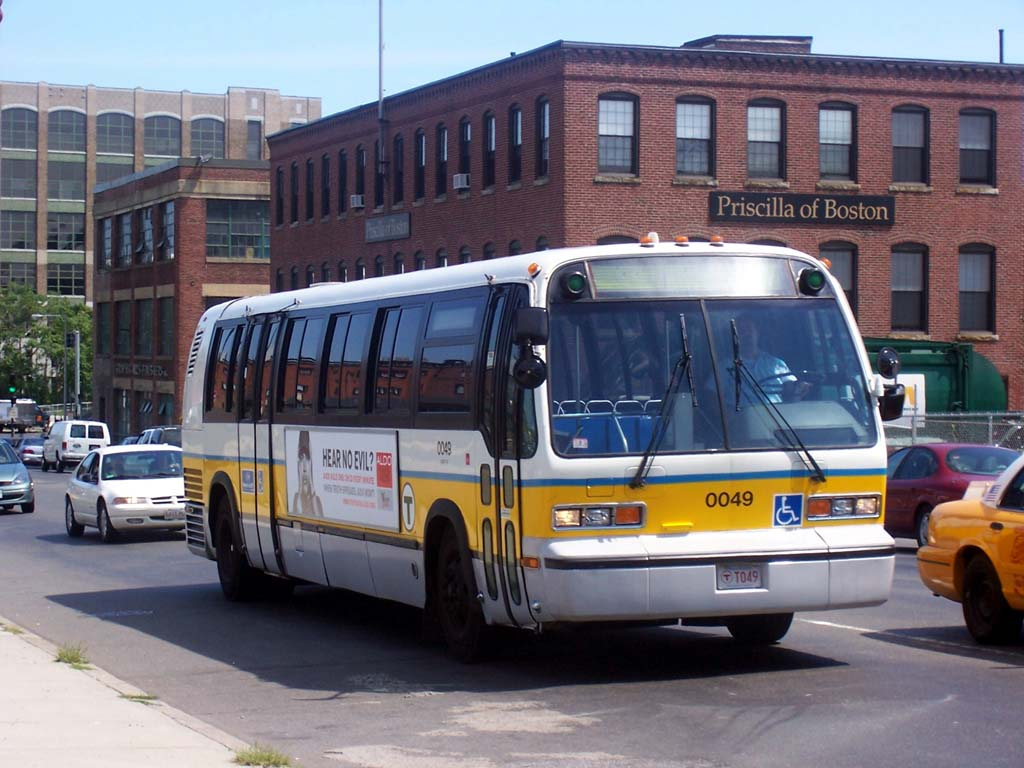
A TMC-built RTS-06 owned by Massachusetts Bay Transit Authority.

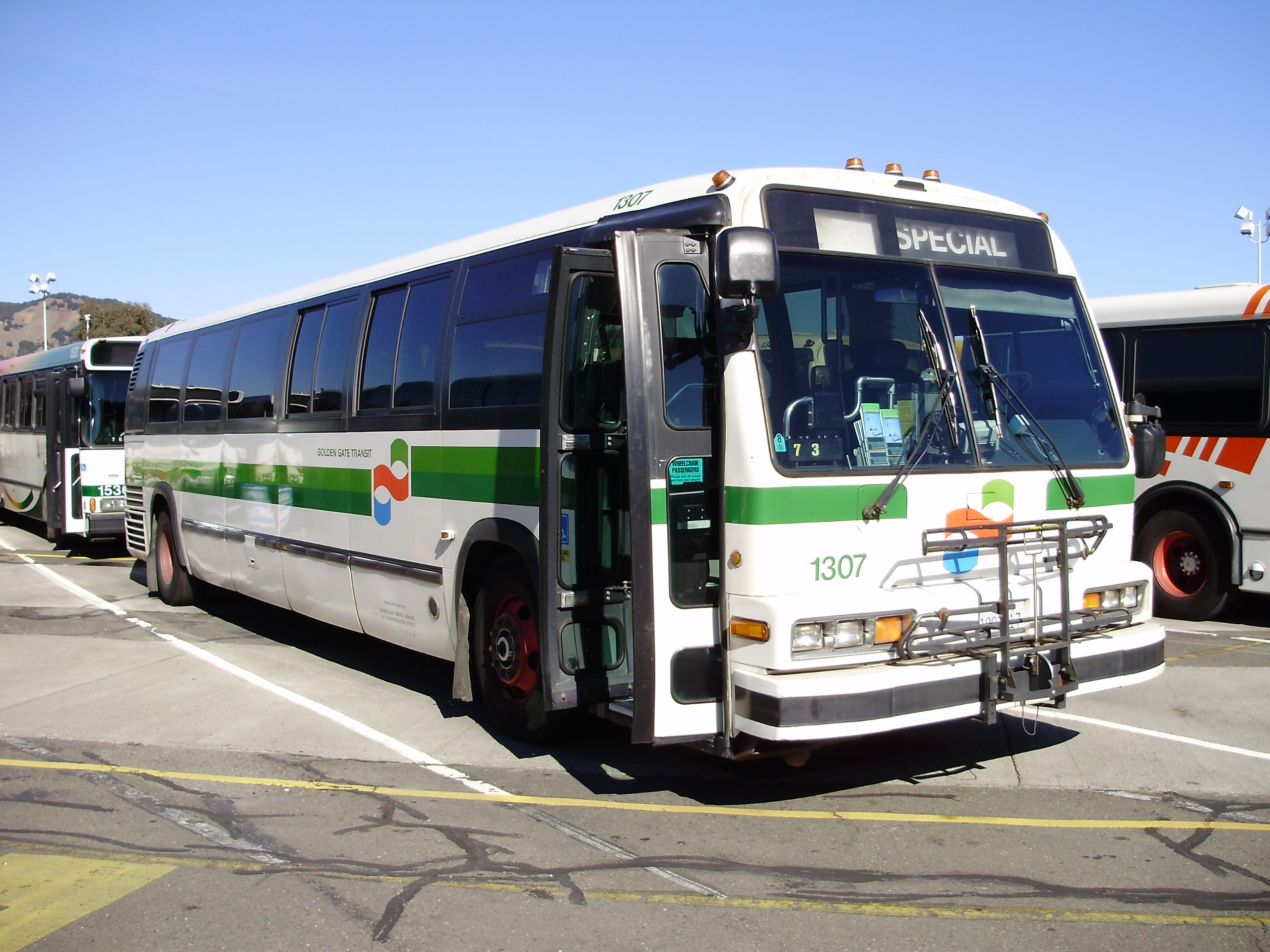
RTS-06 WFD model with wide front door (and bike rack in front) with "flattened" fascia

- 1978: The first 35-foot (10.67 m) RTS's are offered as is the option of electronic destination signs (as opposed to rollsigns).
- 1979: Rear door GM-designed wheelchair lifts were made available.
- 1981: With an order by the Port Authority of New York and New Jersey (for NYCTA and cousin organization MaBSTOA), the option of a pop-open rear door is offered. This option becomes commonplace mostly in large cities as well as with the RTS-08. Also, a set of tell-tale lights were also offered; these lights can be found on each side of the front destination lights. The MBTA has green lights, while NYCTA buses have orange lights.
- 1984: A one-door suburban variant is offered for the first time, this is soon retired due to a combination of poor sales and decreased wheelchair access. It would be offered again in WFD form under Nova Bus.
- 1986: Methanol-powered RTS's are produced in limited quality, these are the first alternatively fueled RTS buses.
- 1989: Compressed natural gas-powered RTS's enter production.
- 1996: First 30-foot (9.1 m) RTS's produced, some production is moved to the Nova Bus plant in Niskayuna, New York.
- 2001: A test order of diesel-electric hybrid RTS's are produced for the aforementioned NYCTA and New Jersey Transit (one of which is shown above).

== Deployment ==
=== United States ===
Long Beach Public Transportation received the first production RTS-01 (TH-8201) in 1977. The agency later restored the bus and donated it to the Museum of Bus Transportation in Hershey, Pennsylvania in 2006. The other agencies participating in the consortium purchase of RTS-01s included HouTran (Houston, Texas), San Antonio MTA, Brockton Area Transit Authority (Brockton, Massachusetts), Dallas Transit System, and AC Transit (serving the East Bay counties of the San Francisco Bay Area). AC Transit did not accept their RTS-01 buses and the order was resold to the neighboring Santa Clara County Transit District.

NFTA Metro of Buffalo, New York received the first order of 96" RTS-03 Buses (Serial Numbers 001–065), whereas Detroit's DDOT received the first 102" order (Serial Numbers 001–070). The RTS-03 featured a modular design, which became the hallmark of the RTS; seamless, un-openable side windows; sliding ("plug") front and rear doors; and a distinctive, sloped rear module. The New York City Transit Authority (NYCTA) ordered two RTS-03's as test vehicles, and sold one each to Green Bus Lines Inc., Queens Transit Corp. and Steinway Transit Corp. after they used the data learned to make changes in their order of RTS buses which became the RTS-04 model.

The first RTS-04 buses were 35' long models delivered to San Antonio in 1980; Pueblo Transportation Co and Metro Dade County Transit Authority also received 40' long RTS-04s in 1980, equipped with the newer Detroit Diesel 6V92TA engine. The NYCTA's first RTS-04s were delivered in 1981 with the proven 6V71 engine. Transit agencies across the country ordered the RTS 04 in large amounts during this model's run. For example, NFTA Buffalo, NY ordered 110 units in 1983 (fleet numbers 6001-6110), and the Southern California Rapid Transit District (SCRTD) ordered more than 400 units in preparation for the 1984 Summer Olympics.

When the RTS-06 was introduced in 1986, the first bus built was a 96" wide model that went to the Massachusetts Port Authority in Boston; the first quantity order was for the 102" wide models that were delivered to Snohomish County Public Transportation Benefit Area Corporation shortly afterward.

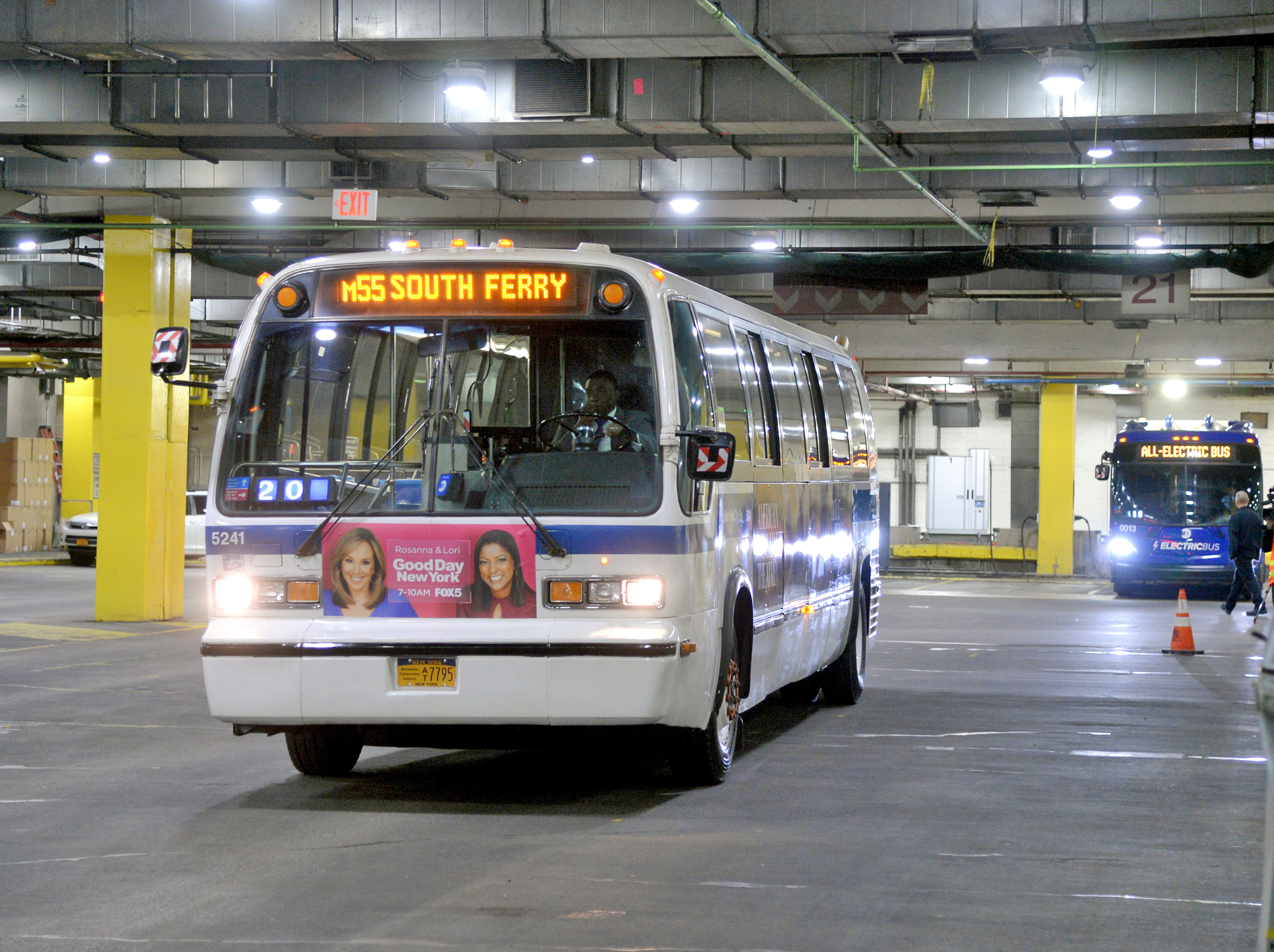
Darryl Irick, MTA Bus Company President, drives #5241 out of the Michael J. Quill Depot on May 6, 2019.

On April 30, 2019, the NYCTA retired the last of these RTS buses from regular passenger service with 1999 Nova Bus RTS-06 bus #5108 having the honor of doing the final curtain call on the B3 bus route in Brooklyn, New York. A retirement ceremony, with a ceremonial farewell celebrations with a last RTS partial trip on the M55 bus route with 1999 NovaBus RTS-06 bus #5241 was held on Monday May 6, 2019 to officially announce that these RTS buses were officially retired from passenger service with 1999 RTS-06 buses #'s 5241 & 5249 on display in front of MTA's headquarter's at 2 Broadway for this historic occasion. These RTS buses have been in continuous service for the NYCTA for 38 years since August 5, 1981 when the first MTA NYCTA's GMC RTS-04 # 1201 of East New York Depot was placed into service on the B7 bus route in Brooklyn, New York. The MTA-NYCTA/MaBSTOA was the largest RTS fleet operator.

Several RTS-06 buses were rebuilt by Complete Coach Works for the Winston-Salem Transit Authority starting in 2019 to extend their service life for 12 years.

=== Canada ===
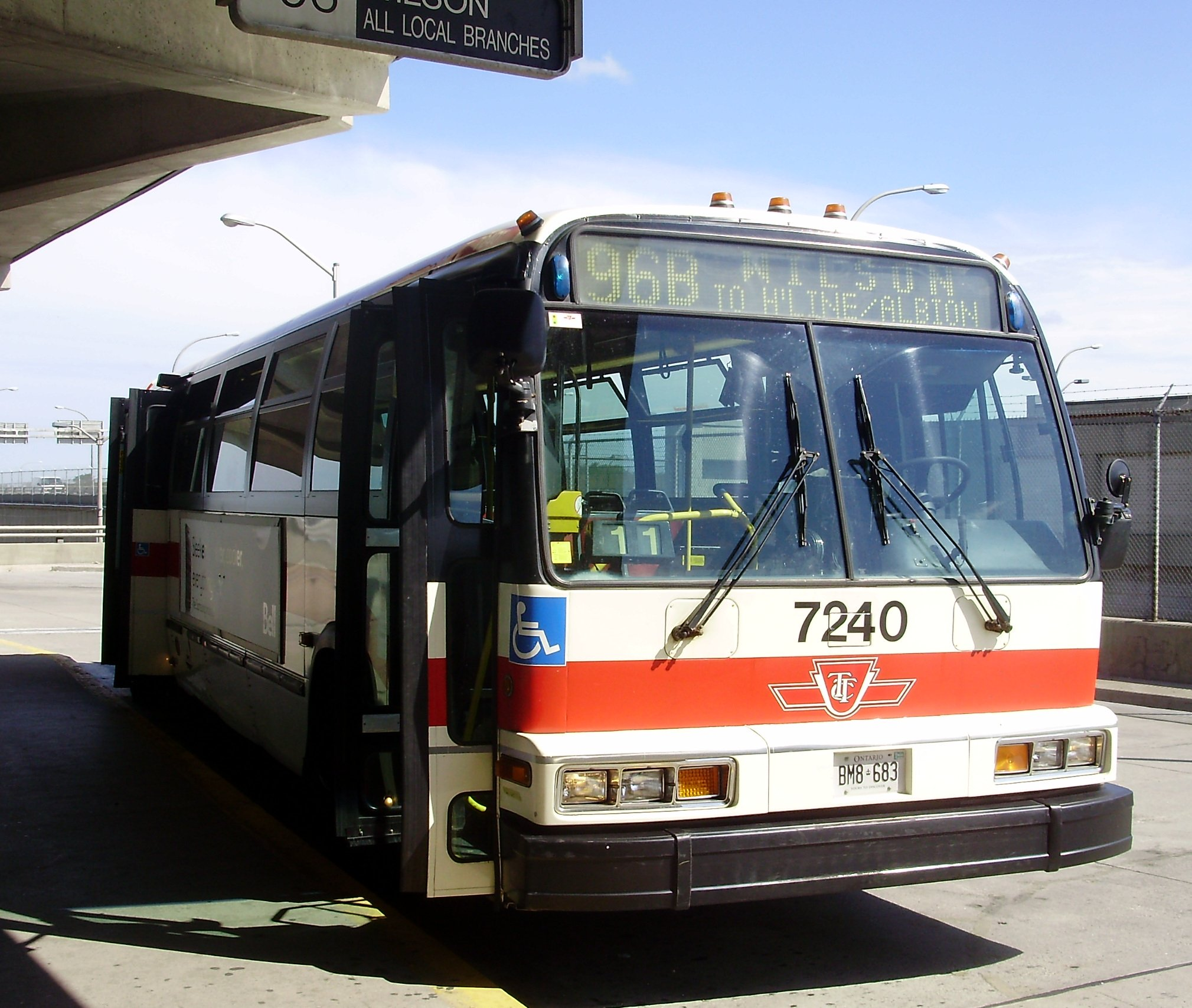
A diesel Nova Bus RTS WFD owned by Toronto Transit Commission.

At the time the RTS entered production in the US, GMDD (GMC's Canadian production arm) considered producing the RTS for the Canadian market. However, an outcry of protest from key transit providers over not wanting the "futuristic" RTS led GMDD to produce the Classic, an updated New Look that was first produced in 1983. The Classic would prove popular with US agencies as well.

When the Classic was retired in 1997, Nova Bus decided to begin limited production of the RTS for the Canadian market. Produced from 1997 to 2001, most of the RTS models made for Canadian agencies were the RTS-06 WFD variant with the majority being sold to agencies in the eastern part of the country. Notably, the Toronto Transit Commission in Ontario operated a fleet of 52 buses built in 1998 while Société de transport de l'Outaouais in Quebec had 12 buses built in 2000.

Quebec-based Dupont Trolley Industries, specializing in rebuilding buses, previously offered a rebuilt RTS known as the Victoria with several styling changes. These buses are fairly uncommon, with most examples found in the fleets of transit operators in Montréal's suburbs (CIT Roussillon, Sainte-Julie public transit, CIT Chambly-Richelieu-Carignan).

=== Elsewhere ===
From 1985 to 1997 Daewoo Bus built the BH120 Royale and the BH115H, a bus originally styled in a manner similar to the RTS. However, according to the Daewoo catalog, it states that it incorporated GMC's intercity coach model. Although in reality, the Royale has incorporated chassis from the Japanese bus manufacturer, Isuzu with Daewoo built MAN engine. The Royale compared to RTS has a completely different body structure, boasting underfloor baggage compartments, and sporting no modular construction. This bus is frequently assumed to be a foreign variant of an RTS, but apart from appearance, it shares nothing with it. The BH120 Royale was later restyled and renamed as BH120 Royale Super which distanced itself visually from the RTS and resembles its Japanese counterpart Isuzu Super Cruiser combined with elements inspired by Neoplan, while the BH115H's successor was later restyled with design languages inspired by a Setra S80 and the Mitsubishi Fuso Aero Bus when the BH115H was replaced with both the Daewoo BH117H Royal Cruistar and the Daewoo BH116 Royal Luxury

However, General Motors did briefly consider building small quantities of the RTS at its GM Holden's subsidiary in Australia. A press release was issued noting the feasibility study, but no production commenced. Additionally, General Motors' Diesel Division in London, Ontario, Canada, also launched a study into building RTS coaches within its facilities, but never actually built any coaches.

== Manufacturers ==
- GMC: 1977–1987
- TMC: 1987–1994
- Nova Bus: 1994–2002
- Millennium Transit Services as RTS Legend, Express, Extreme, Evolution: 2003–2012
- Dupont Industries – rebuilds of old RTS buses and renamed as Victoria

=== Millennium Transit Services ===
Millennium Transit Services LLC
- Industry: Transit
- Founded: 2003
- Defunct: 2012 (Bankruptcy)
- Headquarters: Roswell, New Mexico, United States
- Products: Rapid Transit Series
- Parent: Ludvik Co.
- Website: www.millenniumtransit.com

Millennium Transit Services, LLC was a bus manufacturer formed in 2003 to take over the former Nova Bus manufacturing plant in Roswell, New Mexico, and continue construction of the Rapid Transit Series (RTS) buses that were built there. The company was composed mostly of former Nova Bus employees and financed by the city of Roswell, the State of New Mexico, and Pioneer Bank.

MTS had secured its first contract from the city of El Paso, Texas, to convert 25 Transportation Manufacturing Corporation-built RTS buses from diesel to CNG. The second order was from Pueblo Transit for two transit buses.

On July 27, 2005, the company announced its first major order: 68 transit and 221 suburban buses for New Jersey Transit. Full delivery of this order was expected to commence late in the third quarter of 2006, but "the inability to obtain necessary funds" forced the cancellation of the order. All units completed for New Jersey Transit at that point were rejected and resold to Foxwoods Resort Casino (five transit), Somerset County Transportation (Somerset County, New Jersey) (one transit and one suburban), and Texas A&M University (25 transits).

Other orders included those from Santa Fe Trails and Beaumont Municipal Transit System. These latter two have since been canceled.

On August 29, 2008, the company filed for Chapter 11 bankruptcy protection. The company cleared Chapter 11, but in February 2012 suspended production of its buses. The factory reopened in the summer of 2012; however, Millennium had yet to win any significant orders to date since the cancellations.

A map check in 2019 appears to indicate that MTS no longer exists as an entity, and their facilities at 42 W-Earl Cummings Loop is now a vacant building and lot. The whole property, formerly occupied by MTS, was available for lease as of January 28, 2019, and for sale as of June 28, 2022. As of February 2024, there were plans to redevelop the site, which had been vacant for over a decade.

RTS models offered by Millennium Transit Services
| Model | Type | Length | Floor height | Door width | Notes |
|---|---|---|---|---|---|
| RTS Legend | Transit | 30, 32 1/2, 35, 37 1/2, 40 foot | high | narrow or wide | |
| RTS Express | Suburban/Coach | 30, 32 1/2, 35, 37 1/2, 40, 42 1/2 foot | high | narrow or wide | |
| RTS Extreme | Transit | 32 1/2, 35, 40, 42 1/2 foot | low | wide | offered from 2012 |
| RTS Evolution | Minibus | varies | high | narrow | RTS body for a cutaway van chassis; none built |

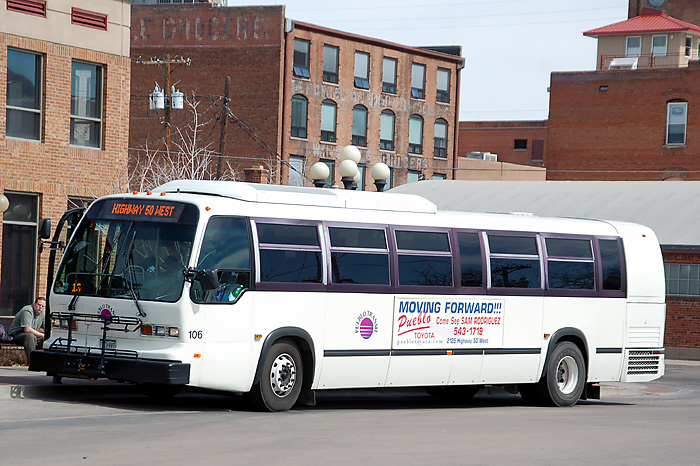
Pueblo Transit 106, in Pueblo, Colorado. The first production bus manufactured by MTS.

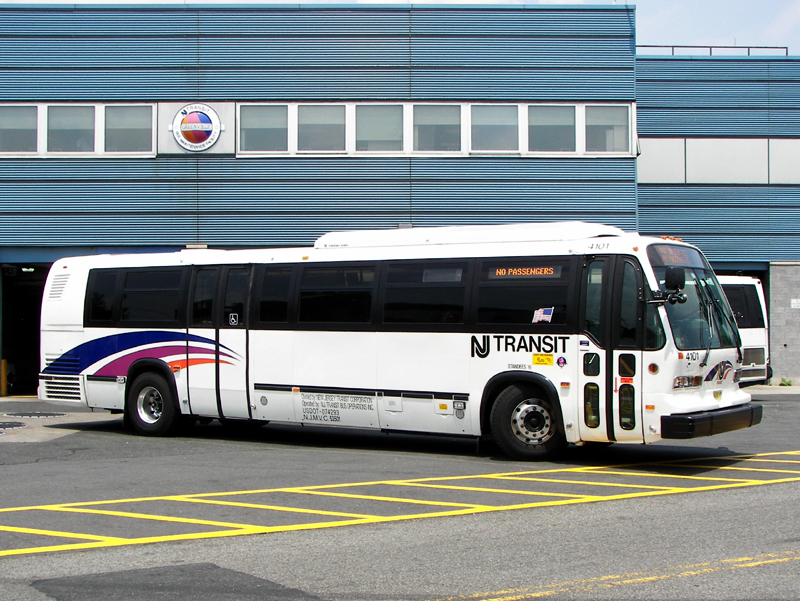
NJ Transit RTS Legend 4101 at Greenville Garage in Jersey City, New Jersey, during a maintenance burn-in.

== See also ==
- GMC New Look – Previous 1960s generation GMC bus
- Flxible Metro – major competitor to the Rapid Transit Series
- GMC/MCI/NovaBus Classic – Updated version of the New Look, offered as an alternative to the RTS
- Neoplan Transliner – ADB competitor
