= MC-12 =

MC-12 may refer to:

- a coach/bus manufactured by Motor Coach Industries
- the military version of the Beechcraft C-12 Huron
- the automobile, Maserati MC12
