= New York Trolley Company =

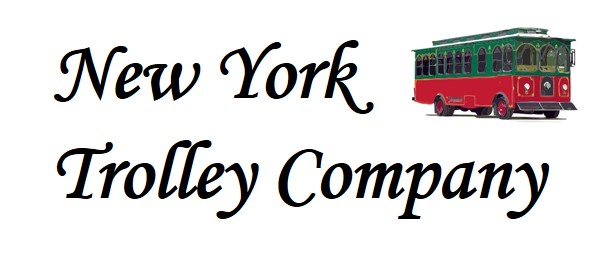
New York Trolley Co

The New York Trolley Company is a trolley rental service based in New York, NY. The company was founded in 2009 by David S. Pike. Their fleet of tourist trolleys cater to events such as weddings, pub crawls, corporate events, birthday parties, and bachelorette parties. They serve the five boroughs, Long Island, and parts of New Jersey and Connecticut.

Since its founding, the Company has grown through several partnerships with non-profit organizations and word-of-mouth marketing. It has received press in the New York Post and The Campus Socialite.

Several celebrity weddings in the NYC area have used New York Trolley Company including Lucinda Ruh as well as non-profits including Heart of Brooklyn's First Saturday museum shuttle.
