= Tourist trolley =

Rubber-tired bus designed to resemble an old-style streetcar or tram

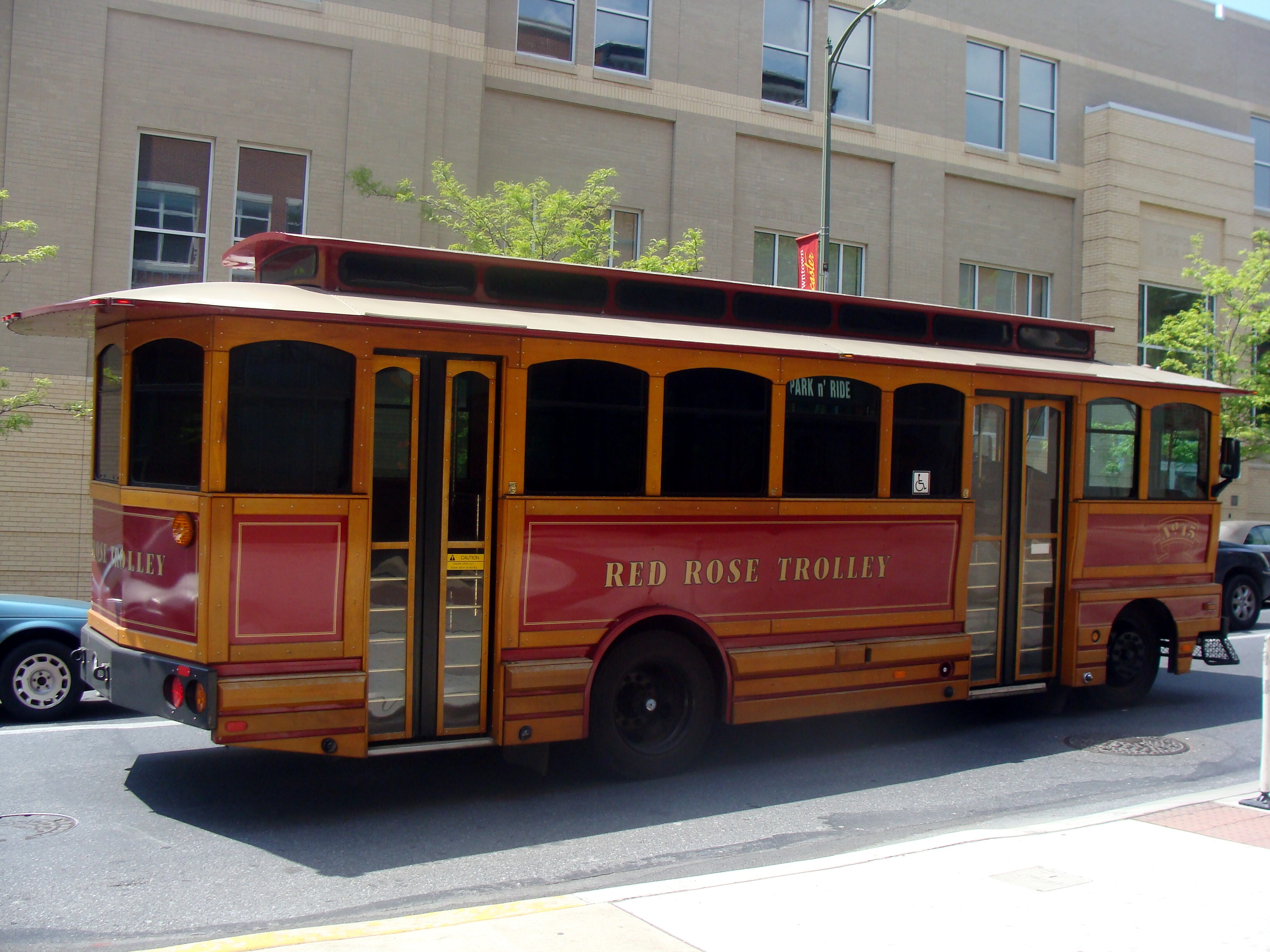
Optima tourist trolley formerly operated by RRTA in Lancaster, Pennsylvania.

A tourist trolley, also called a road trolley, is a bus designed to resemble an old-style streetcar or tram, usually with false clerestory roof. The vehicles are usually fueled by diesel, or sometimes compressed natural gas.

The name refers to the American English usage of the word trolley to mean an electric streetcar. As these vehicles are not actually trolleys, and to avoid confusion with trolley buses, the American Public Transportation Association (APTA) refers to them as "trolley-replica buses".

The trend of tourist-oriented shuttle or tour buses being made to resemble trolley cars/streetcars is believed to have begun around 1975, in the United States, although rare examples existed earlier.

== Use ==
Tourist trolleys are used by both municipal and private operators. Municipal operators may mix tourist trolleys in with the regular service bus fleet to add more visitor interest or attract attention to new routes. In many cities tourist trolleys are used as circulators. Tourist trolleys are also run by private operators to carry tourists to popular destinations.

In San Francisco, tourist trolleys mimic the city's famous cable cars.

Tourist trolleys sometimes operate in places which also have streetcars. For example, tourist trolleys operate in Philadelphia, which also has actual trolley service.

== Operators ==
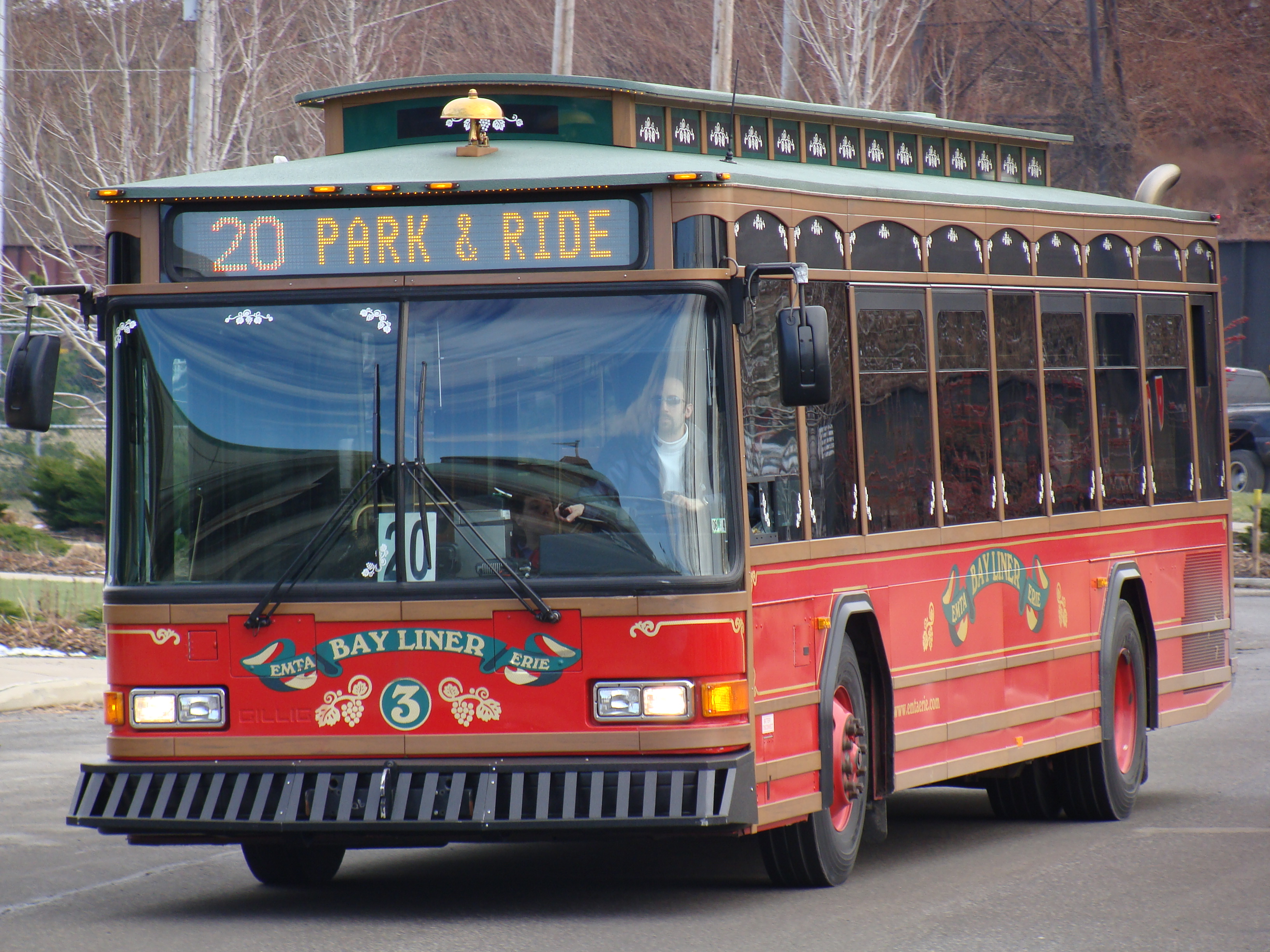
Gillig Trolley owned by EMTA.

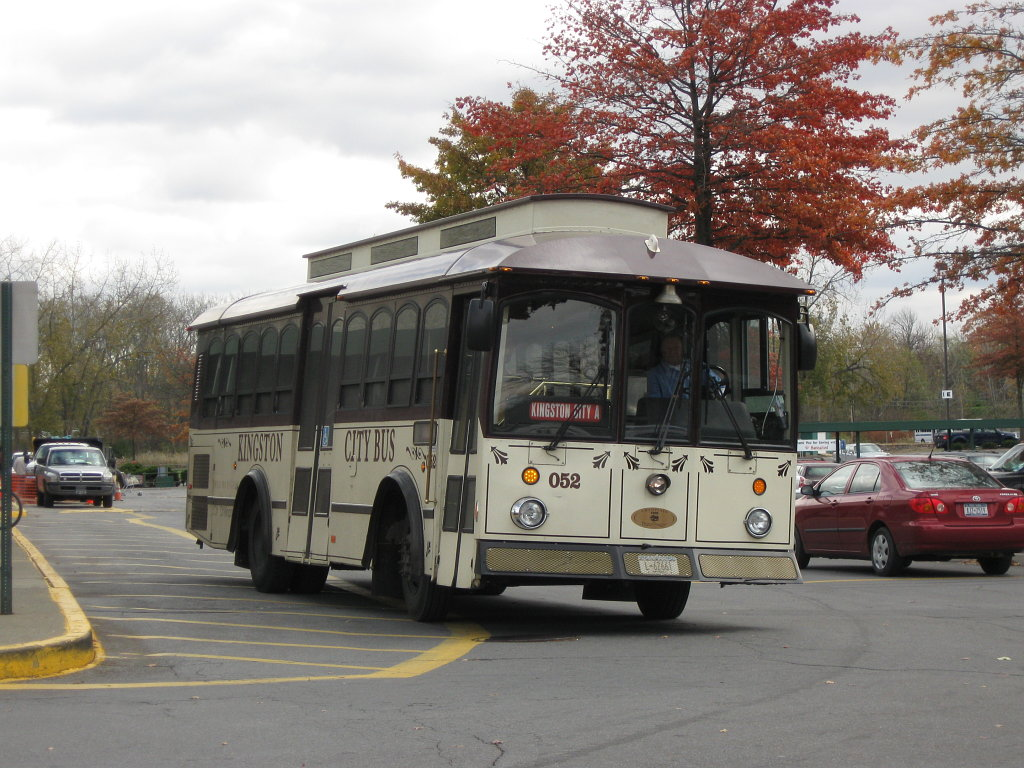
Dupont Trolley owned by Kingston Citibus.

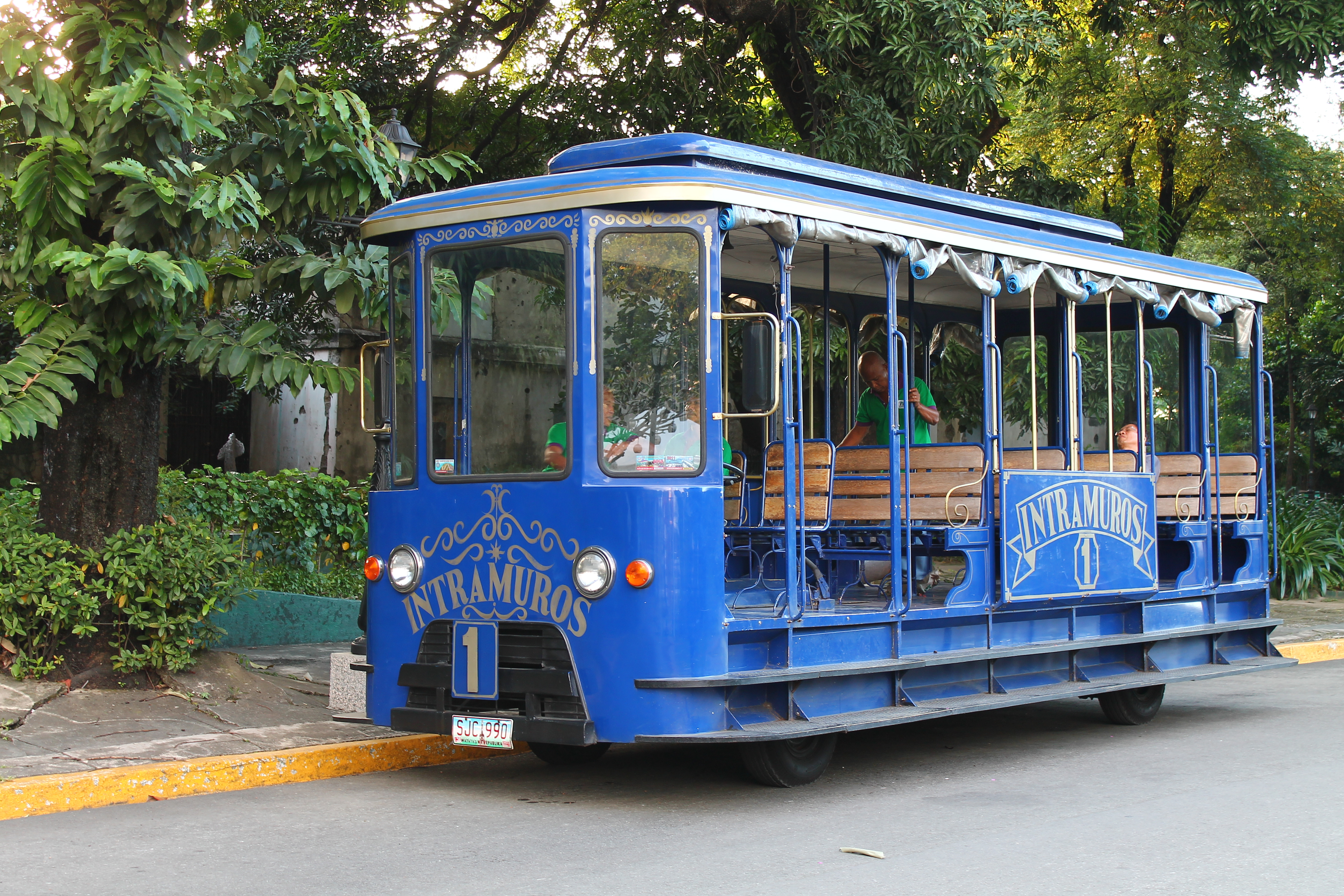
A "Tranvia" trolley in Intramuros, Manila. A Molly style trolley in San Diego, Old Town Trolley Tours.

Notable operators of tourist-trolley buses:

- Historic Tours Of America: Old Town Trolley Fully narrated history, music, ghost, and holiday tours operating in Key West and St.Augustine Florida, Boston Massachusetts, Savannah Georgia, Nashville Tennessee, Washington DC, San Diego California, San Antonio Texas, and Charleston South Carolina. Old Town Trolley takes guests to a variety of historic and cultural locations in each city, offering the history, lore, jokes, and personal anecdotes to help guests feel connected to the town they are visiting. Each one also operates separate museums and attractions in each city like the Conch Shell Train in Key West or the Tea Party Museum in Boston.
- New York Trolley Company
- Williamsburg Area Transit Authority – Local shopping centers and points of interest, including Merchants Square in Williamsburg, Virginia
- Capital Metropolitan Transit Authority – Dillo Routes in downtown Austin, Texas
- Erie Metropolitan Transit Authority – Bayliner Route in downtown Erie, Pennsylvania
- Gray Line Worldwide
- Kingston Citibus in Kingston, New York
- Montgomery Area Transit Service – Lightning Route Trolleys in Montgomery, Alabama
- Pace – circulator in the Chicago area
- Chicago Trolley & Double Decker Co. – Largest sightseeing/charter company in the Midwest
- Red Rose Transit Authority – circulator in downtown Lancaster, Pennsylvania (retired in 2019 and replaced with regular buses)
- Rhode Island Public Transit Authority – Providence LINK in downtown Providence, Rhode Island
- Transit Authority of River City – Louisville, Kentucky
- VIA Metropolitan Transit – VIA Streetcar in San Antonio, Texas
- Ollie the Trolley in Scottsdale, AZ circulator in Downtown Scottsdale
- Riverside Transit Agency – shuttle service in downtown Riverside, CA, Temecula, CA and around UC Riverside
- Molly's Trolley in West Palm Beach, Florida
- I-Ride Trolley in Orlando, Florida
- Sun Trolley in Fort Lauderdale, Florida
- Miami Trolley in Miami, Florida
- Doral Trolley in Doral, Florida
- TANK operates Southbound Shuttle, which circles the riverfront cities of Newport, Kentucky, Covington, Kentucky, and Cincinnati, Ohio.
- Wave Transit operates a circular tourist route in downtown Wilmington, NC.
- Capital District Transportation Authority (CDTA) – Saratoga Visitors Trolley (Saratoga Springs, NY; from Memorial Day Weekend until Labor Day Weekend)
- Niagara Frontier Transportation Authority (NFTA); Route 55T Tourist Trolley along Pine Avenue in Niagara Falls, New York between Niagara Falls and the Niagara Falls International Airport.
- Housatonic Area Regional Transit in the past had a trolley service in downtown Danbury, but service was later suspended. HARTransit purchased a new trolley-replica bus in June 2014.
- Coast Transit Authority Beachcomber (1) and Casino Hopper (2) lines in Biloxi, Mississippi
- Pigeon Forge Mass Transit in Pigeon Forge, Tennessee
- Intramuros Administration operates at least three trolleys or "tranvias" in Intramuros, Manila which resembles the old pre-World War II Tranvía.

== Manufacturers ==
=== Current ===
- Cable Car Classics, Inc.
- Gillig Corporation
- Hometown Trolley
- Specialty Vehicles
- Molly's Trolleys

=== Former ===
- Dupont Industries
- Optima Bus Corporation (formerly Chance Coach Inc.)

== See also ==
- Trackless train – tram in U.S. English.
- Trolleybus
- Heritage streetcar
- Duck tour – uses an amphibious vehicle for sightseeing.
- List of buses
