= Nova Bus =

Canadian bus manufacturer

Nova Bus Inc.

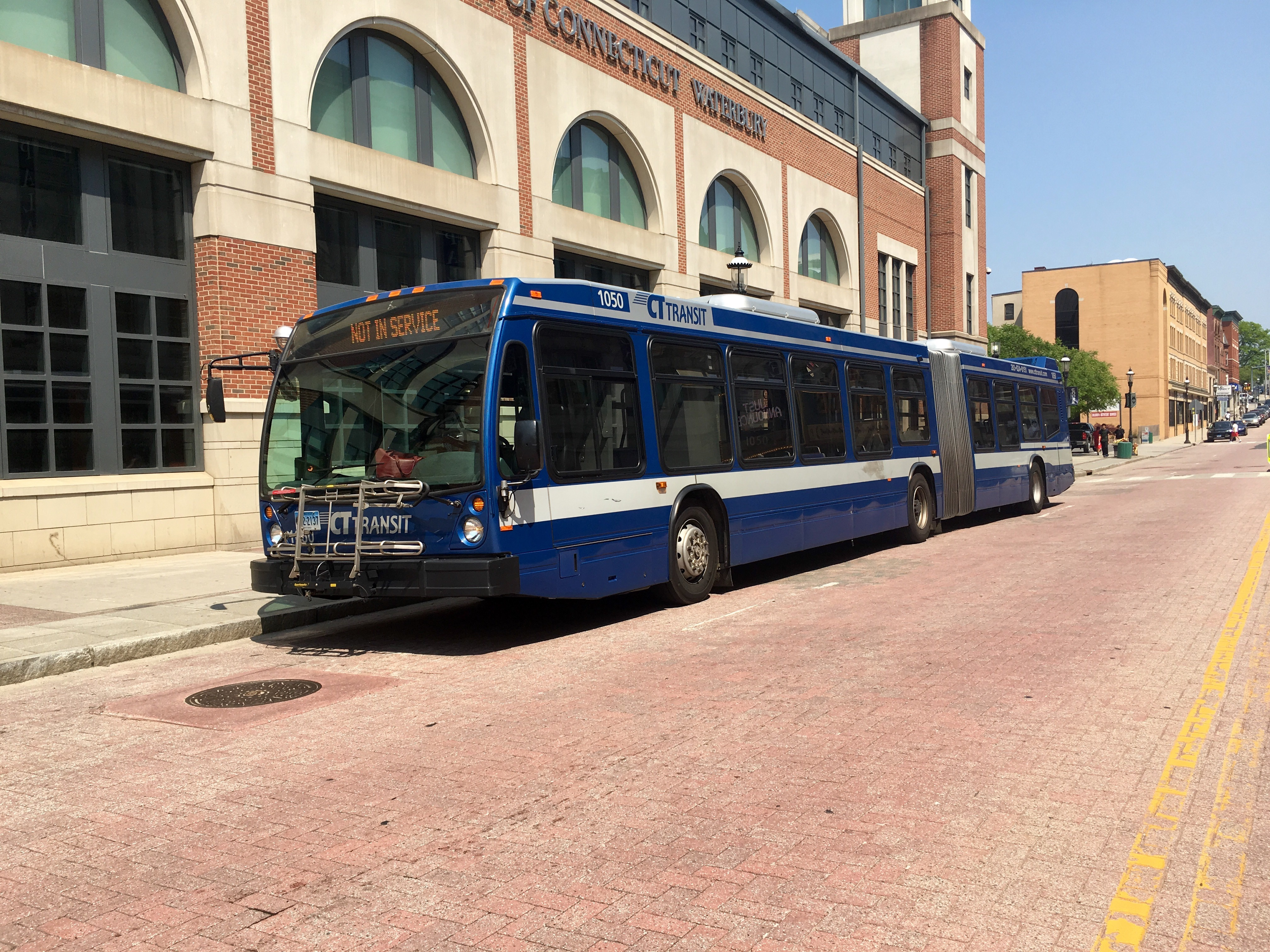
- Connecticut Transit Nova Bus LFS Articulated bus
- Formerly: Nova Bus Corporation
- Type: Subsidiary
- Industry: Automotive
- Predecessor: General Motors Diesel Division; Transportation Manufacturing Corporation
- Founded: 1979; 47 years ago (plant); 1993; 33 years ago (company)
- Headquarters: Saint-Eustache, Quebec, Canada
- Area served: Canada and United States
- Key people: Paul Le Houillier (President)
- Products: Public transit buses
- Owner: Volvo
- Website: novabus.com/en/

Nova Bus is a Canadian transit bus manufacturer headquartered in Saint-Eustache, Quebec. Nova Bus is owned by the Volvo Group.

The company has roots in the General Motors Diesel Division, which opened in 1979. Nova Bus was established in 1993, by Nova Quintech, through the acquisition of Dial Corporation's transit division which consisted of Motor Coach Industries and Transportation Manufacturing Corporation. Volvo took partial ownership of Nova Bus in 1998 and complete ownership in 2004.

== History ==
Nova Bus's Saint-Eustache factory is a former General Motors plant that built city transit buses for the Canadian and US market. Inaugurated in 1979, the plant was used to produce the New Look bus (up to 1983) and the Classic (starting 1982) model for sales in Canada. In 1987, GM sold its bus-building holdings to Greyhound Dial Corporation, the parent company of Motor Coach Industries (MCI) while GMC's Rapid Transit Series (RTS) product was moved to join MCI's own designs at Transportation Manufacturing Corporation in Roswell, New Mexico.

By the 1990s, Dial intended to sell its transportation manufacturing and service divisions. The St-Eustache facility was faced with closure. The entity, known as Nova Bus Corporation, was formed by individuals from Nova Quintech and the Fonds de solidarité des travailleurs du Québec to acquire MCI's St-Eustache facility from Dial. Nova Quintech was formed in 1991 after a group of investors purchased the assets of the bankrupt fire truck manufacturer Camions Pierre Thibault Inc. The Government of Quebec agreed to contribute a $2.5-million, interest-free loan, and $10 million in loan guarantees. In addition, they agreed to purchase over 300 buses between 1993 and 1994. The sale of the MCI's St-Eustache operations occurred on 6 July 1993.

MCI and TMC were spun-off from Dial in 1993, and merged with Mexican DINA S.A., who sold the TMC plant and RTS rights to Nova Bus in 1994. The RTS model was continued to be produced in the Roswell plant to meet Buy America requirements.

The Classic and RTS were later discontinued in order to concentrate on the LFS, a low floor city bus, which was announced in 1994 with deliveries starting in 1997. The last Classic model was produced in 1997. Sales of the RTS were insufficient and Nova Bus closed its Roswell and Niskayuna, New York plants in 2002 to concentrate all efforts on the Canadian market. The Roswell plant was later acquired by a local consortium, Millennium Transit Services, who became defunct around 2012. The Chicago Transit Authority (CTA), which in 1998, placed an order for 484 LFS units that were manufactured and delivered between 2000 and 2002, was the first US customer to purchase a large order of this model, and remains one of the larger operators of LFS buses.

By 1998, Nova Bus was acquired by Volvo Buses and Prevost Car who owned 51% of the company while Henlys Group owned 49%. Volvo acquired Henlys remaining interest in 2004.

On February 2, 2008, Nova Bus announced plans for the construction of a new assembly plant in Plattsburgh, New York, signifying the company's return to the US bus market. The plant opened on June 15, 2009. The first order from a US-based customer came from the New York City Transit Authority (NYCTA) for 90 LFS articulated buses; the NYCTA now has nearly 500 articulated and non-articulated LFSs. In March 2010, Nova Bus received the first order for the US-built, redesigned LFS from Honolulu, Hawaii's TheBus; 24 were delivered in December 2010. TheBus planned to order more, but ultimately chose buses from Gillig instead. In March 2012, the Walt Disney Company announced that it plans to test a Nova articulated bus on certain high traffic routes at the Walt Disney World Resort. In 2012, the Southeastern Pennsylvania Transportation Authority (SEPTA) ordered 315 buses, including 225 articulated buses to replace its aging Neoplan AN460 articulated buses and its remaining North American Bus Industries NABI 416 standard buses; the articulated hybrid buses were introduced in Philadelphia on October 27, 2014. In 2013, the Chicago Transit Authority placed an order for 300 40-foot clean-diesel LFSs, with an option to buy an additional 150.

On June 21, 2023, Nova Bus announced that it would again exit the United States market in 2025, and close the Plattsburgh plant. The company cited continuing financial losses in its decision to restructure operations to focus on Canada.

On March 28, 2024, Nova Bus announced the retirement of President Ralph Acs, who retired on April 1, 2024. Acs was succeeded by Paul Le Houillier on June 1, 2024. Acs remains part of the Nova Bus Board of Directors.

== Leadership ==
- Yvon Lafortune (1993–2003)
- Georges Bourelle (2004–2013)
- Jean-Pierre Baracat (2013–2016)
- Raymond Leduc (2016–2023)
- Ralph Acs (2023–2024)
- Krzysztof Trembecki (2024)
- Paul Le Houillier (2024–Present)

== Products ==
=== Current ===
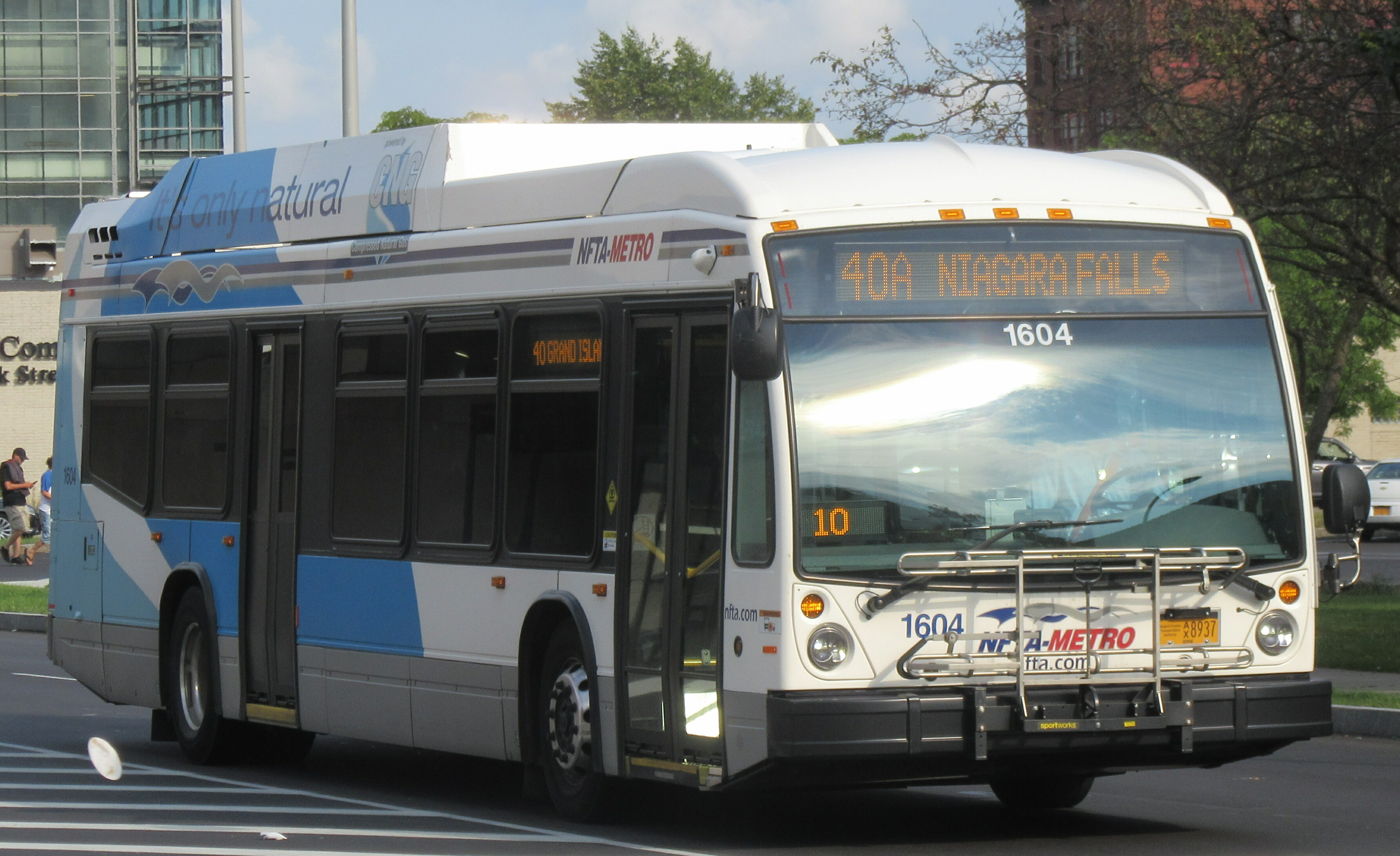
A fourth-generation Nova Bus LFS in Buffalo, New York.

The LFS (Low Floor Series) is currently the only vehicle built by Nova Bus. It was the first bus designed by the company and entered production in 1996.

Since being introduced, the LFS has been redesigned several times, across four generations. Introduced as a diesel-fueled, rigid 40-foot (12 m) bus, several variants have been offered over the last several decades of production.

Several alternative powertrains have been offered including compressed natural gas (CNG) fueled engines, diesel-electric hybrids (both series and parallel arrangements) and battery-electric. Articulated 62-foot (19 m) versions have been offered since 2009. Nova Bus also offers suburban configurations of their 40-foot buses with one door and motorcoach style seating, and previously offered special bodywork styling packages for 62-foot buses intended for use on bus rapid transit services.

=== Past ===
Model	Length	Width	Photo	Years Produced	Notes
Rapid Transit Series (RTS)	9.14 m (30 ft); 10.67 m (35 ft); 12.19 m (40 ft)	2.44 m (96 in); 2.59 m (102 in)		1994–2002	Developed by General Motors (1968–1977); Acquired from Transportation Manufacturing Corporation in 1994; Rights sold to Millennium Transit Services
Classic (TC40102A, TC40102N)	12.19 m (40 ft)	2.59 m (102 in)		1993–1997	Updated version of the New Look bus; Originally produced by General Motors Diesel Division (1983–1987), then Motor Coach Industries (1987–1993); Air conditioning optional (A model)
Classic TC60102N	18.29 m (60 ft)	2.59 m (102 in)		1993	Based on the 1982 General Motors Diesel Division model TA60-102N, but with a full Classic body

== See also ==
- List of buses
