= Pueblo Transit =

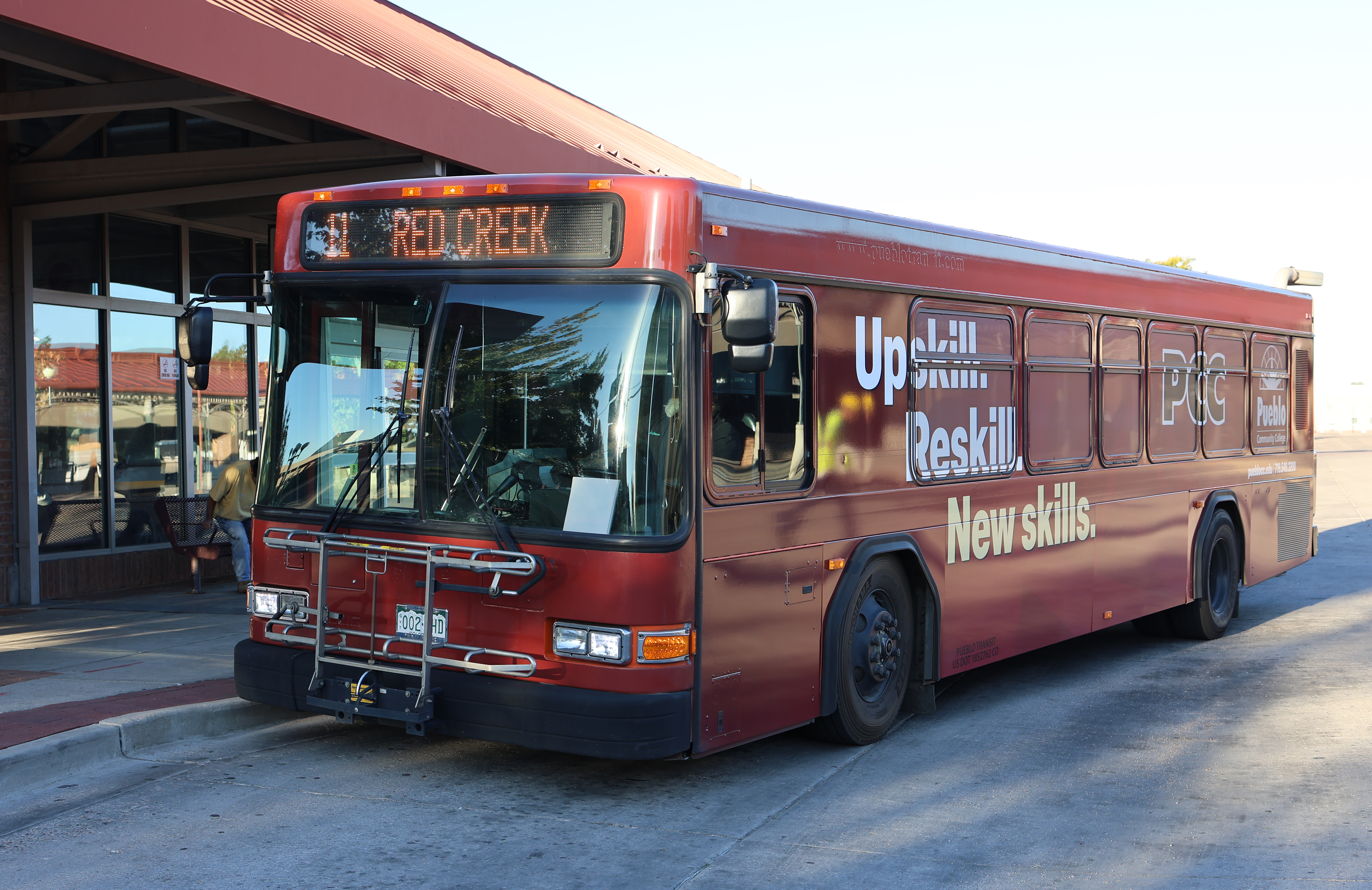
- A Pueblo Transit bus (2025)
- Parent: City of Pueblo
- Founded: 1971
- Headquarters: 350 Alan Hamel Avenue
- Locale: Pueblo, Colorado
- Service area: Pueblo County, Colorado
- Service type: Bus service
- Routes: 13
- Fuel type: Diesel
- Website: Pueblo Transit

Pueblo Transit is the public transportation operator for the metro area of Pueblo, Colorado. Formed in 1971 after a previous public-private transportation alliance went bankrupt, the agency provides thirteen routes. In 2008, the organization made it so all buses were equipped with electronic fare collection boxes, which are designed to encourage more ridership by avoiding the exact-fare requirement of most transit systems.

== Fleet ==
| Fleet numbers | Build Date | Manufacturer | Model | Engine | Transmission |
|---|---|---|---|---|---|
| 182 | 2003 | Gillig | Low Floor 40’ | Cummins ISL | |
| 191 | 2006 | Gillig | Low Floor 40’ | Cummins ISL | |
| 107 | 2007 | NABI - Optima | Opus LFB-34 | Cummins ISB | Allison B300R |
| 108 | 2009 | NABI - Optima | Opus LFB-34 | Cummins ISB | Allison B300R |
| 208 | 2010 | NABI - Optima | Opus LFB-34 | Cummins ISB6.7 | Allison B300R |
| 101 | 2010 | Gillig | Low Floor HEV 35' | Cummins ISL9 | Allison E^{P}40 Hybrid System |
| 310, 410, 510, 810, 910 | 2010 | Gillig | Low Floor 35’ | Cummins ISL9 | Allison B400R |
| 610, 710 | 2010 | Gillig | Low Floor 40' | Cummins ISL9 | Allison B400R |
| 185 | 2018 | Gillig | Low Floor 40' | Cummins L9 | Allison B400R |
| 196 | 2019 | Gillig | Low Floor HEV 35' | Cummins L9 | Allison H 40 EP hybrid system |
| 211 | 2021 | Gillig | Low Floor HEV 35' | Cummins L9 | Allison H 40 EP hybrid system |
| 230-231 | 2023 | Gillig | Low Floor HEV 35' | Cummins L9 | Allison eGen Flex H 40 hybrid system |

== Route list ==
| Route Number | Location |
|---|---|
| 1 | Eastside |
| 2 | Bessemer |
| 3 | Irving Place |
| 4 | Berkeley/Beulah |
| 5 | South Shopping |
| 6 | Pueblo Mall |
| 7 | Highland Park |
| 8 | Hwy 50 West |
| 9 | University |
| 10 | Belmont |
| 11 | Red Creek |
| 12 | Lake Ave |
| 13 | North Shopping |

== Fixed Route Ridership ==
The ridership statistics shown here are of fixed route services only and do not include demand response or vanpool.

== See also ==
- List of bus transit systems in the United States
