= Motor Coach Industries =

American coach and bus manufacturer

- Type: Subsidiary
- Industry: Bus manufacturing
- Founded: 1933; 93 years ago
- Founder: Harry Zoltok
- Headquarters: Des Plaines, Illinois
- Key people: Paul Soubry (President and CEO); Chris Stoddart (Vice President)
- Products: Motorcoaches
- Number of employees: 2,300
- Parent: NFI Group (2015~present)
- Website: mcicoach.com

Motor Coach Industries (MCI) is an American multinational bus manufacturer, specializing in production of motorcoaches. Best known for coaches produced for intercity transit and commuter buses, MCI produces coaches for a variety of applications, ranging from tour buses to prison buses.

Currently, MCI is headquartered in Des Plaines, Illinois. Since 2015, it has been a subsidiary of holding company New Flyer Industries.

== History ==
The company was incorporated in 1933 by Harry Zoltok as Fort Garry Motor Body and Paint Works Limited, in Winnipeg, Manitoba, Canada. In 1948, Greyhound Lines of Canada, at that time MCI's major customer, became a majority shareholder when it purchased 65 percent of the company. MCI was purchased outright by Greyhound Lines in 1958. In 1963 a new plant was opened in Pembina, North Dakota, to increase capacity as MCI began to expand into the U.S. market, while Greyhound widened its operations and switched increasingly from GMC to its own in-house products. In 1974 another plant was opened in Roswell, New Mexico, under the title Transportation Manufacturing Corporation (TMC).

In December 1986, Greyhound was split, with Greyhound Lines being sold to an investor group, and Greyhound Lines of Canada, MCI and TMC remaining part of The Greyhound Corporation, which was renamed Dial, Inc. in 1991.

In 1987, Greyhound Corporation bought the transit bus manufacturing operations of General Motors Diesel Division (GMC), which was based in Canada. (GM phased out intercity and transit bus construction at the large GMC Coach and Truck plant in Pontiac, Michigan, shifting medium duty school bus chassis production to Janesville, Wisconsin.)

MCI also took over production of GM's RTS model, transferring production to TMC. MCI also purchased the GM bus assembly plant in Saint-Eustache, Quebec, which then produced GM's Canadian transit bus model, the Classic. TMC ceased production of the older MCI vehicles in 1990 to concentrate on manufacturing the RTS, and on the A-Series intercity coaches.

In 1993 MCI became an independent corporation, Motor Coach Industries International Inc.

=== 1994 acquisition ===
In 1994, MCI stocks were purchased by Mexican DINA S.A., which had a long history of bus building and developed their HTQ proprietary technology (valued at 70 million dollars) that culminated with the creation of the Viaggio Confort Bus Line. MCI reproduced its Viaggio 1000 DOT for sale to the United States and Canada, and in late 1999/2000 the G4100, G4500 and F3500 models were released to the United States and to the Canadian markets. Production of the G4500 later moved to Winnipeg, after the G4100 was discontinued. Poor reliability of the G4500 resulted in very low sales after Greyhound Lines filed a lawsuit against MCI over the various issues with the bus. Greyhound took delivery of very few Winnipeg-built G4500s; these were later retired and sold. Related to a major contract cancellation by Western Star, DINA S.A. sold a great portion of its previously acquired MCI shares to Joseph Littlejohn & Levy.

In 1994 TMC, including production rights for the RTS, was sold to NovaBus. In 1997 MCI purchased the rights from the bankrupt Flxible to produce the Flxible Metro and all related parts for it. After a period of waning product demand, increased competition and lay-offs in the early 2000s, production at MCI plants in Winnipeg and Pembina increased in 2006, and 130 employees were added.

During the late 1990s and early 2000s, MCI consolidated its operations, the Winnipeg site was expanded and modernized. DINA S.A. purchased North American Symix and opened an assembly plant in Buenos Aires, Argentina and the DIMEX and DINAIR companies. A new coach finishing and paint facility and customer delivery centre were constructed on the site. At the same time, a seven-year contract was signed with the IAM union local. This agreement contained cost improvements and production operations flexibility to improve the productivity and competitiveness of the manufacturing and assembly operations.

The older buses, especially the MC-8, MC-9, and 102A3/B3/C3 workhouse models of the 1980s, became the standard for interstate travel for so many bus companies. Those particular buses featured metal frames and roof supports, metal panels on the sides and were extremely durable and reliable. Many of the buses, having survived millions of miles of commercial use, had a second career serving churches or other organizations, while the MCI/TMC coaches were popular "conversion shells", used for motorhomes.

=== 2008 bankruptcy ===
Motor Coach Industries Inc. announced on September 15, 2008, the company had filed for Chapter 11 bankruptcy protection as part of a restructuring the company said would "help shed hundreds of millions of dollars of debt".

On April 17, 2009, Motor Coach Industries Inc. emerged from its voluntary Chapter 11 reorganization. MCI and its subsidiaries became wholly owned by KPS Capital Partners, LP. KPS Capital Partners, LP is the Manager of the KPS Special Situations Funds, a family of private equity limited partnerships with over $2.6 billion of committed capital focused on constructive investing in restructurings, turnarounds, and other special situations.

=== Partnership with Daimler AG ===
Motor Coach Industries announced on April 25, 2012, that it had reached a deal with German vehicle manufacturer Daimler AG to distribute its Setra brand of motorcoaches for the North American market. The agreement came as Daimler reconfigured its commercial bus operations in North America, also selling off its Orion brand of transit buses to New Flyer Industries.

Under the agreement, Setra would build its S407 and S417 motorcoaches in Germany and ship them to North America, where MCI would sell and service the coaches using its existing dealer network. In exchange, Daimler would purchase a 10 percent share in Motor Coach Industries.

The relationship between competitors was less than ideal. Daimler complained that MCI focused on its own motorcoaches, and did not allow for sufficient attention to the Setra brand.

The deal came to an end on January 4, 2018, with Daimler signing a new distribution rights agreement with REV Group, a U.S.-based specialty vehicle manufacturer. Sales of new motorcoaches transferred immediately, followed by the service agreement in mid-2018.

=== 2015 acquisition ===
On November 10, 2015, it was announced that Canadian bus manufacturer New Flyer Industries had agreed to acquire Motor Coach Industries, Inc. for C$604 million (approximately US$459 million). The deal closed in December 2015.

In late 2022, the factory in Pembina, North Dakota was planned to be shut down; this decision was later reversed, and the facility has since remained open. The U.S. assembly line was moved to the NFI group facility in Crookston, Minnesota.

== Operating subsidiaries ==
- Motor Coach Industries, Ltd. – Canadian manufacturing facility, located in Winnipeg, Manitoba
- Motor Coach Industries, Inc. – U.S. manufacturing facility, located in Pembina, North Dakota
- Motor Coach Industries, Inc. – U.S. headquarters in Des Plaines, Illinois
- MCI Sales and Service, Inc. – U.S. new and used coach sales division
- MCI Service Parts – aftermarket parts sales division of the company, based in Des Plaines, Illinois, with its distribution center located in Louisville, Kentucky, with close access to the international UPS distribution center
- MCI Financial Services – coach financing division, based in Dallas, Texas

== Models ==
After the Courier and MC model name schemes, MCI adopted an alphanumerical system for naming the different series of coaches. Two different systems have been used:

2001–present
Series	Nominal Length	Generation	Options
D E F G J	35 = 35 ft (11 m); 40 = 40 ft (12 m); 41 = 41 ft (12 m); 45 = 45 ft (14 m)	00 = 1st 05 = 2nd 20 = 3rd	CL = "classic" styling CT = "contemporary" styling CNG = compressed natural gas fueled H = hybrid-electric ISTV = inmate security transportation vehicle N = 96-inch (2.4 m) narrow body CRT = NextGen Commuter Coach; CRT LE = NextGen Commuter Coach with low floor section for wheelchairs CHARGE = battery-electric

1985–2001
Width	Series	Options	Axles	Body option
96 = 96 inches (2.4 m); 102 = 102 inches (2.6 m)	A	W = wheelchair lift-equipped	2; 3	—
96 = 96 inches (2.4 m); 102 = 102 inches (2.6 m)	B	—	2; 3	SS = stainless steel
96 = 96 inches (2.4 m); 102 = 102 inches (2.6 m)	C	—	2; 3	SS = stainless steel
96 = 96 inches (2.4 m); 102 = 102 inches (2.6 m)	D	L = 45 ft 7 in (13.89 m) length W = wheelchair lift-equipped	2; 3	SS = stainless steel
96 = 96 inches (2.4 m); 102 = 102 inches (2.6 m)	E	L = 45 ft 7 in (13.89 m) length	2; 3	—

For Example, a wheelchair-lift equipped, 45-foot, diesel powered, D-Series with fluted stainless steel sides from 1997 would be designated a 102-DLW3SS. A 45-foot, battery-electric powered J-Series from 2020 would be designated a J4500 CHARGE. Not all possible combinations of models, lengths, and powertrains are made.

=== Current ===
Motor Coach Industries currently produces two different product lines. All current models are 102 inches (2.59 m) wide, exclusive of mirrors.

Series	Models	Length	Photo	Introduced	Notes
D	D4020 ISTV	40 ft (12.19 m)		2022	Replaced D4000 ISTV
D	D45 CRT; D45 CRT CHARGE; D45 CRT LE; D45 CRT LE CHARGE; D4520	45 ft (13.72 m)	D45 CRT LE	2017	Part of NextGen D-Series.; D45 CRT LE includes low floor section for wheelchairs.
J	J3500	35 ft (10.67 m)		2018	First 35 foot MCI bus since the F-Series.
J	J4500; J4500 CHARGE	45 ft (13.72 m)	J4500 (Post-Facelift)	2001	Received a facelift in 2013.

=== Past ===
==== Letter series (post-1985) ====
Series	Models	Length	Width	Photo	Introduced	Discontinued	Notes
A	96-A2; 96-A3	40 ft (12.19 m)	96 in (2.44 m)	102-A2	1985	1991	Offered with fluted stainless steel front and sides only.; First mass-produced 102 in (2.59 m)-wide coaches by MCI.; Available with 2 or 3 axles (last digit indicated the number of axles).; Also offered with a wheelchair lift (designated 102-AW3).
A	102-A2; 102-A3	40 ft (12.19 m)	102 in (2.59 m)	102-A2	1986	1991	Offered with fluted stainless steel front and sides only.; First mass-produced 102 in (2.59 m)-wide coaches by MCI.; Available with 2 or 3 axles (last digit indicated the number of axles).; Also offered with a wheelchair lift (designated 102-AW3).
B	96-B3	40 ft (12.19 m)	96 in (2.44 m)	102-B3	1991	1994	Designed as an affordable alternative to the C-Series.; Offered with fluted stainless steel or smooth paintable front-end and sides.
B	102-B3	40 ft (12.19 m)	102 in (2.59 m)	102-B3	1991	1993	Designed as an affordable alternative to the C-Series.; Offered with fluted stainless steel or smooth paintable front-end and sides.
C	102-C3	40 ft (12.19 m)	102 in (2.59 m)	102-C3	1988	1993	Front-end design incorporated into the D-Series.; Offered with fluted stainless steel or smooth paintable front-end and sides from 1992.
D	102-D3; D4000; D4000H	40 ft 6 in (12.34 m)	102 in (2.59 m)	102-DL3 D4000	1994	2005	Replaced B and C-Series coaches.; Offered with fluted stainless steel or smooth paintable front-end and sides.; 102-D3 renamed to D4000 in 2001.; Hybrid-electric model (designated D4000H) also offered.; Replaced by updated models in 2005.
D	102-DL3; D4500	45 ft 7 in (13.89 m)	102 in (2.59 m)	102-DL3 D4000	1992	2005	First 45 ft coach built by MCI.; Offered with fluted stainless steel or smooth paintable front-end and sides.; 102-DL3 renamed to D4500 in 2001.; Replaced by updated models in 2005.
D	D4000N	40 ft 6 in (12.34 m)	96 in (2.44 m)	102-DL3 D4000	2002	2004	Only 12 units of this model were produced: 8 for Pace and 4 for NJ Transit.
D	D4005; D4000CL; D4000CT; D4000CTH; D4000ISTV	40 ft 6 in (12.34 m)	102 in (2.59 m)	D4500CT D4500CT (updated headlights)	2006	2022	Restyled with frameless windows and headlights from the G-Series, designated "CT" (contemporary) styling: D4000CT and D4500CT.; Models with the original square headlights and framed windows were designated "CL" (classic): D4000CL and D4500CL.; CT version also available with hybrid electric ("CTH") or CNG ("CT CNG") powertrain.; Rubber front bumper and framed windows are optional on CT version.; Rubber front bumper is standard on ISTV units.; Replaced by second generation models in 2022.
D	D4505; D4500CL; D4500CT; D4500CTH	45 ft 7 in (13.89 m)	102 in (2.59 m)	D4500CT D4500CT (updated headlights)	2005	2022	Restyled with frameless windows and headlights from the G-Series, designated "CT" (contemporary) styling: D4000CT and D4500CT.; Models with the original square headlights and framed windows were designated "CL" (classic): D4000CL and D4500CL.; CT version also available with hybrid electric ("CTH") or CNG ("CT CNG") powertrain.; Rubber front bumper and framed windows are optional on CT version.; Rubber front bumper is standard on ISTV units.; Replaced by second generation models in 2022.
E	102-EL3; E4500; E4500LX	45.58 ft (13.89 m)	102 in (2.59 m)	102-EL3	1998	2013	Also known as the Renaissance.; Introduced the curved stepwell.; Renamed to E4500 in 2001.; E4500LX introduced in 2005 as a top-of-the-line luxury appointed coach.; Differs from the current J-Series in cosmetic changes and onboard technologies.
F	F12; F3500	35 ft 5.5 in (10.81 m)	102 in (2.59 m)	F3500	2000	2003	Produced in Mexico by DINA.; Designated as F12 in the Mexican market.; Offered as a conversion shell.
G	G4100	41 ft 7 in (12.67 m)	102 in (2.59 m)	G4500	1998	2001	Designed for Greyhound.; Introduced as the 102-G3 and 102-GL3.; Only 25 G4100s were built.; Redesigned headlights incorporated on the later D-Series models.
G	G4500	45 ft 7 in (13.89 m)	102 in (2.59 m)	G4500	2000	2005	Designed for Greyhound.; Introduced as the 102-G3 and 102-GL3.; Only 25 G4100s were built.; Redesigned headlights incorporated on the later D-Series models.

==== MC series (1958–1998) ====
These models bore the MC-number designation.

Series	Models	Length	Width	Photo	Introduced	Discontinued	Notes
MC-1	MC-1; MCX-1	35 ft (10.67 m)	96 in (2.44 m)		1959	1961	Prototype designated MCX-1
MC-2	MC-2; MCX-2	35 ft (10.67 m)	96 in (2.44 m)		1960	1961	Prototype designated MCX-2
MC-3	MC-3; MCX-3	35 ft (10.67 m)	96 in (2.44 m)		1961	1963	Prototype designated MCX-3
MC-4	MC-4	35 ft (10.67 m)	96 in (2.44 m)		1963	1963	
MC-5	MC-5; MCC-5; MCX-5	35 ft (10.67 m)	96 in (2.44 m)	MC-5B	1963	1964	Prototype designated MCX-5.; Canadian models designated MCC-5.; First buses built at MCI's Pembina, ND plant.
MC-5	MC-5A; MCC-5A	35 ft (10.67 m)	96 in (2.44 m)	MC-5B	1964	1970	Early Canadian models designated MCC-5A.
MC-5	MC-5B	35 ft (10.67 m)	96 in (2.44 m)	MC-5B	1971	1977	Clearance and marker lights shared with the later MC-8 model.
MC-5	MC-5C	35 ft (10.67 m)	96 in (2.44 m)	MC-5B	1978	1980	Styling updated to match the MC-8.
MC-6	MC-6 MCX-6	40 ft (12.19 m)	102 in (2.59 m)	MC-6	1968	1969	Prototype designated MCX-6.; First 102 in wide bus produced by MCI.; Built exclusively for Greyhound.; Also nicknamed the Supercruiser.
MC-7	MC-7	40 ft (12.19 m)	96 in (2.44 m)	MC-7	1968	1973	Also known as the Challenger.; First 40-foot buses built by MCI.; Most Greyhound examples called Super 7 Scenicruiser.
MC-8	MC-8	40 ft (12.19 m)	96 in (2.44 m)	MC-8	1973	1978	Also known as the Crusader.; Side windows modified in last year of production.
MC-9	MC-9; MC-9A; MC-9B; MC-9 Special	40 ft (12.19 m)	96 in (2.44 m)	MC-9 MC-9B	1978	1991	Also known as the Crusader II.; Commuter coach models known as MC-9A and MC-9B.; MC-9Bs distinguished from MC-9As by a larger front destination sign.; Later model MC-9s known as the MC-9 Special.; MC-9 Specials distinguished by optional square headlights and late model years.
MC-12	MC-12	40 ft (12.19 m)	96 in (2.44 m)	MC-12	1991	1998	Similar appearance to previous MC-9 Special.; Designed for Greyhound.; Also sold as a prisoner transport vehicle.; Last MCI model with a slanted rear cap.

==== Courier series (pre-1960) ====
Series	Models	Photo	Introduced	Discontinued	Notes
100	Courier 100; Courier 100A; Courier 100B; Courier 100C		1946	1949	
200	Courier 200; Courier 200A; Courier 200B		1947	1950	
85	Courier 85; Courier 85A; Courier 85X		1950	1953	
50	Courier 50; Courier 50A		1950	1955	
95	Courier 95; Courier 95D; Courier 95 Skyview	Courier 95 Skyview	1953	1960	Courier 95D model was diesel powered.; Skyview model had panoramic windows.
90	Courier 90; Courier 90 Skyview		1953	1960	Skyview model had panoramic windows.
96	Courier 96		1955	1960	
97	Courier 97		1956		Only one unit built.

=== Transit (all discontinued) ===
Series	Models	Length	Width	Photo	Introduced	Discontinued	Notes
150	150				1939		Based on the Yellow Coach PDG Silversides.
40TRY	40TRY				1942		Trolleybus demonstrator.; Used by the Winnipeg Electric Company until the late 1960s.
Classic	TC40-102A; TC40-102N	40 ft (12.19 m)	102 in (2.59 m)	TC40-102N	1987	1993	Design acquired from General Motors in 1987.; Design sold to NovaBus in 1993.
Classic	TC60-102N	60 ft (18.29 m)	102 in (2.59 m)	TC60-102N	1992	1993	Articulated bus.; Design sold to NovaBus in 1993.
Citycruiser	T-30	30 ft (9.144 m)	96 in (2.44 m)	T-30	1979	1982	Produced by subsidiary TMC under license from Ontario Bus Industries.
RTS	RTS-06; RTS-08	30 ft (9.144 m); 35 ft (10.67 m); 40 ft (12.19 m)	96 in (2.44 m); 102 in (2.59 m)	RTS-06	1987	1995	Produced by subsidiary TMC.; Design acquired from General Motors in 1987.; Design sold to NovaBus in 1995.
