= Classic (transit bus) =

Single-deck bus developed by General Motors Diesel Division

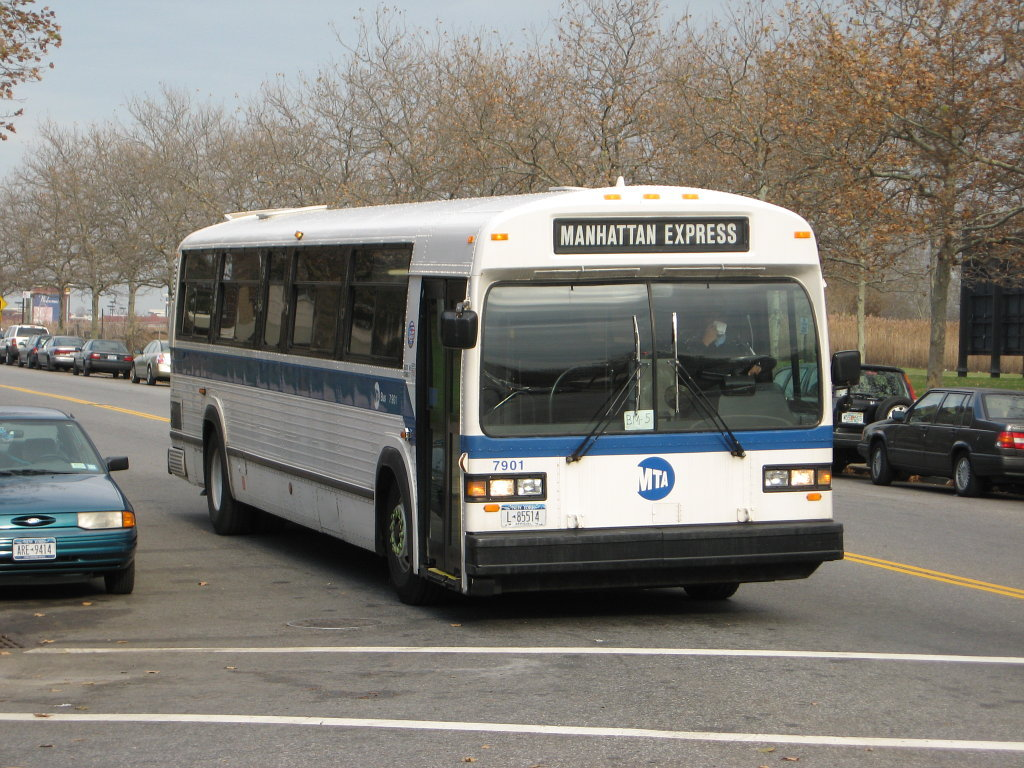
- MCI Classic TC40-102A configured for commuter service

Overview
- Manufacturer: General Motors Diesel (1982-1987); Motor Coach Industries (1987-1993); Nova Bus (1993-1997)
- Production: 1982–1997
- Assembly: Canada: Saint-Eustache, Quebec; United States: Niskayuna, New York

Body and chassis
- Class: Transit bus
- Body style: Single-deck bus
- Doors: 1 or 2

Powertrain
- Engine: Detroit Diesel 6V71/8V71; Detroit Diesel 6V92/8V92; Cummins C8.3; Detroit Diesel Series 50
- Transmission: Allison, ZF or Voith

Dimensions
- Length: 40 ft (12.19 m) (16 60 ft (18.29 m) units produced)
- Width: 102 in (2.59 m)

Chronology
- Predecessor: GM New Look
- Successor: Rapid Transit Series (after 1997); Nova Bus LFS

The Classic is a single-deck bus that was developed by General Motors Diesel from its previous-generation New Look design produced from 1982 to 1997. The "Classic" was nearly identical to the New Look from the belt rail up, but sported a new front which allowed for a wider front door.

The design was originally intended solely for the Canadian market as an alternative to the unpopular Rapid Transit Series (RTS) but ultimately the Classic was met with widespread success in both Canada and the United States. It was available primarily as a 40-foot (12.19 m) long, 102-inch (2.59 m) wide coach, although 16 60-foot (18.29 m) long articulated Classics were manufactured. The design was fairly conservative, yet contemporary and less controversial than the RTS.

== History ==
When GMC in the United States decided to replace the New Look with the RTS II series in 1977, they hoped that they would win over operators in both the US and Canada. But the design and the futuristic look turned off most Canadian transit operators. In 1979, GM Canada's Transit division decided to continue producing New Looks until 1982, when it unveiled the Classic. Several orders for New Looks were still accepted, built and delivered until 1986 for U.S. properties, although the buses were made in Canada.

The Classic proved to be a popular in the U.S. as well, where the Utah Transit Authority would be the first American operator, in 1983, to order the buses (the first order in 1983 was 39, followed by 63 in 1984 and 66 in 1990), which was later followed by orders from DDOT (Detroit), Grand Rapids, Connecticut Transit, Big Blue Bus (Santa Monica), and the contract bus operators serving the New York City metropolitan area (who used single-door Classics for commuter routes).

In 1987 GM sold the transit bus division to Motor Coach Industries (MCI). By 1993 the bus division changed hands again, this time going to Nova Bus. During the two transitions the Classic continued to be built until Nova Bus discontinued the model in 1997, as most agencies preferred the new low-floor LFS design. The last Classics were built in 1997, for the Société de transport de l'Outaouais (STO) of Gatineau, Quebec. At the same time the RTS model was discontinued, leaving the LFS and its derivatives as the only bus available from Nova Bus.

Nova Bus also assembled Classics in the US in 1995 and 1996 from its now-closed plant in New York state. They were delivered to Buffalo, Connecticut, Rochester, the suburbs of Chicago (Pace), and Pittsburgh, the last US transit agency to receive Classics (Nova Bus took over the Port Authority Transit contract after previous awardees such as Flxible went bankrupt in 1995). These agencies have retired the American-built units, but some have been refurbished and rebuilt by third-party distributors.

=== Retirements ===
As of 2020, the STO was still running Classics, but they have now all been retired with the arrival of the 2020 Nova Bus LFS HEV buses. Pittsburgh, Montreal (including Laval and the South Shore agencies), Ottawa, Buffalo, Halifax, Lévis, Toronto, Santa Monica, Connecticut, Rochester, PACE, Quebec City, Windsor and Winnipeg have retired most of their Classics due to increasing maintenance costs, difficulty in obtaining replacement parts, and the agencies' plans to convert to low-floor fleets. However, a few transit agencies began purchasing used Classics due to rising costs and lack of funding for new buses. Regina Transit had acquired used Classics due to provincial and government funding issues, which lasted until early 2014, when they received funding for new buses and to retire their last MCI Classics, becoming 100% low-floor. Metrobus Transit (St. John's, NL) retired their last Classics in January 2016, Calgary Transit retired their last Classics on December 18, 2014, and their fleet is completely accessible as some were sold to STO and Saskatoon Transit, the latter having retired its Classic fleet in 2018. Quebec City's Réseau de transport de la Capitale retired its last Classic on March 3, 2016. NFTA Metro's Classics retired in 2016 when the Nova Bus LFS CNG buses arrived. A former 1986 Hamilton Street Railway Classic (HSR 8602) that was retired in 2002 was featured as part of a redecorating sketch in a 2005 episode of The Red Green Show.

=== Preservation ===
As of 2020, Classics from Vancouver, Calgary, Connecticut, Montreal, New York City, Saskatoon, Santa Monica, Toronto and Winnipeg have been preserved by local non-profit bus groups. OC Transpo GM Classic 8776 has been preserved by a private individual as of 2017. BC Transit (Victoria Regional) MCI Classics 944 and 947 have been preserved by private individuals in Ontario. A private operator owns a 1994 NovaBus Classic that was retired from Quebec City. Utah Transit Authority has retained MCI Classic 9066 as part of their preservation fleet.

All 16 of the articulated buses were scrapped upon retirement, but some parts from the Halifax Transit fleet were saved for use on their remaining refurbished Classics.

== Models ==
The model designations used for Classics consisted of two letters followed by a series of five numbers then another letter. The only versions built were the TC40-102A, TC40-102N and the TA60-102N. All were equipped with an automatic transmission. (Some TC40-102As with no center exits have been erroneously identified as SC40-102As, but a true Suburban version would have had all forward-facing seats, no center exit, a lowered center aisle and underfloor baggage compartments.)

Series	Type	Length	-	Width	Air conditioning
T = transit bus: When first introduced, a suburban (S) version was rumoured to be planned.	A = articulated C = Classic	40 = 40 feet (12 m); 60 = 60 feet (18 m): Design work was started on a 35-foot (11 m) version, but none were produced.	-	102 = 102 inches (2.6 m)	A = air conditioned N = non-air conditioned

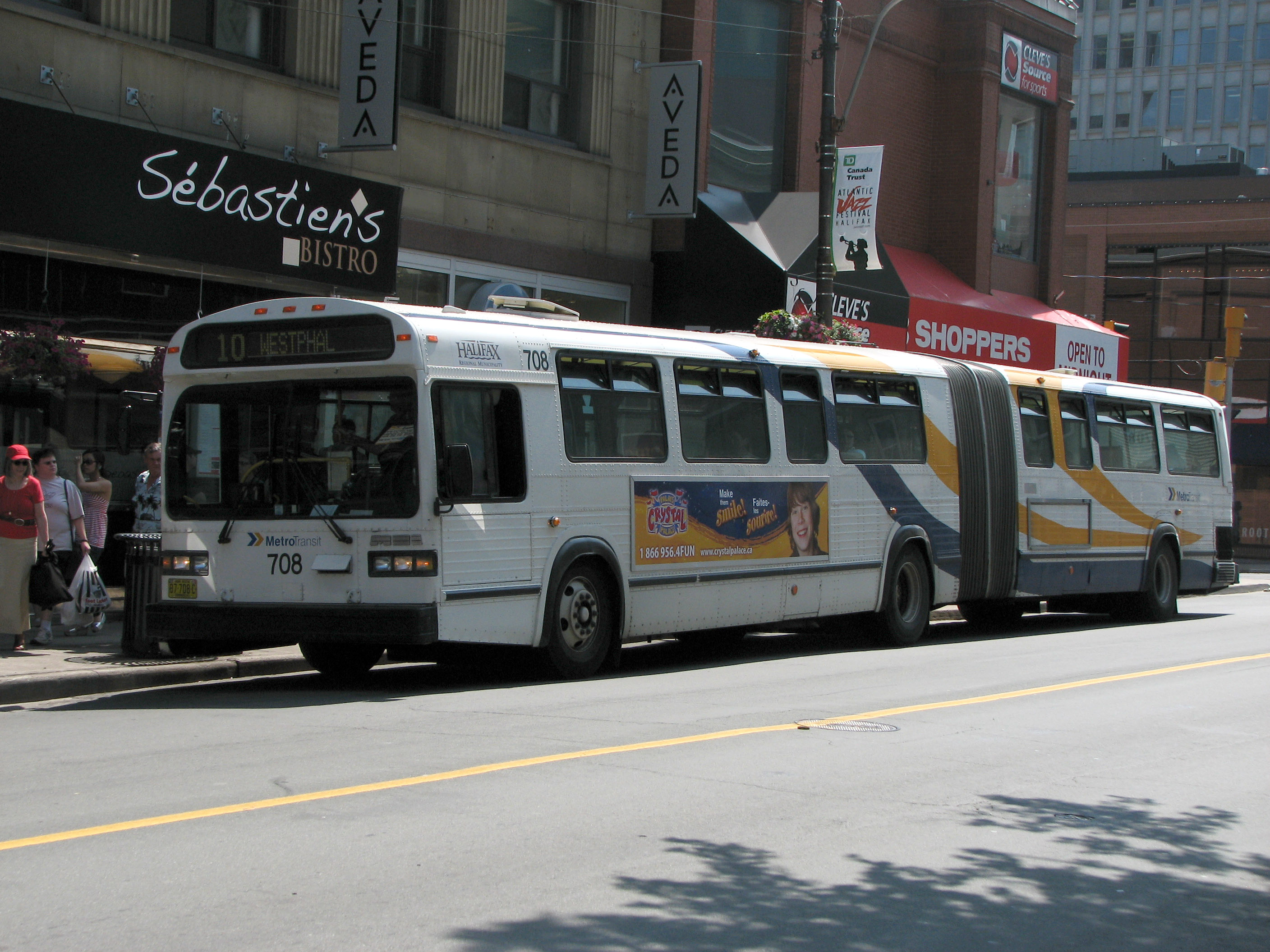
MCI Classic TC60-102N articulated bus operating for Halifax Transit of Halifax, Nova Scotia

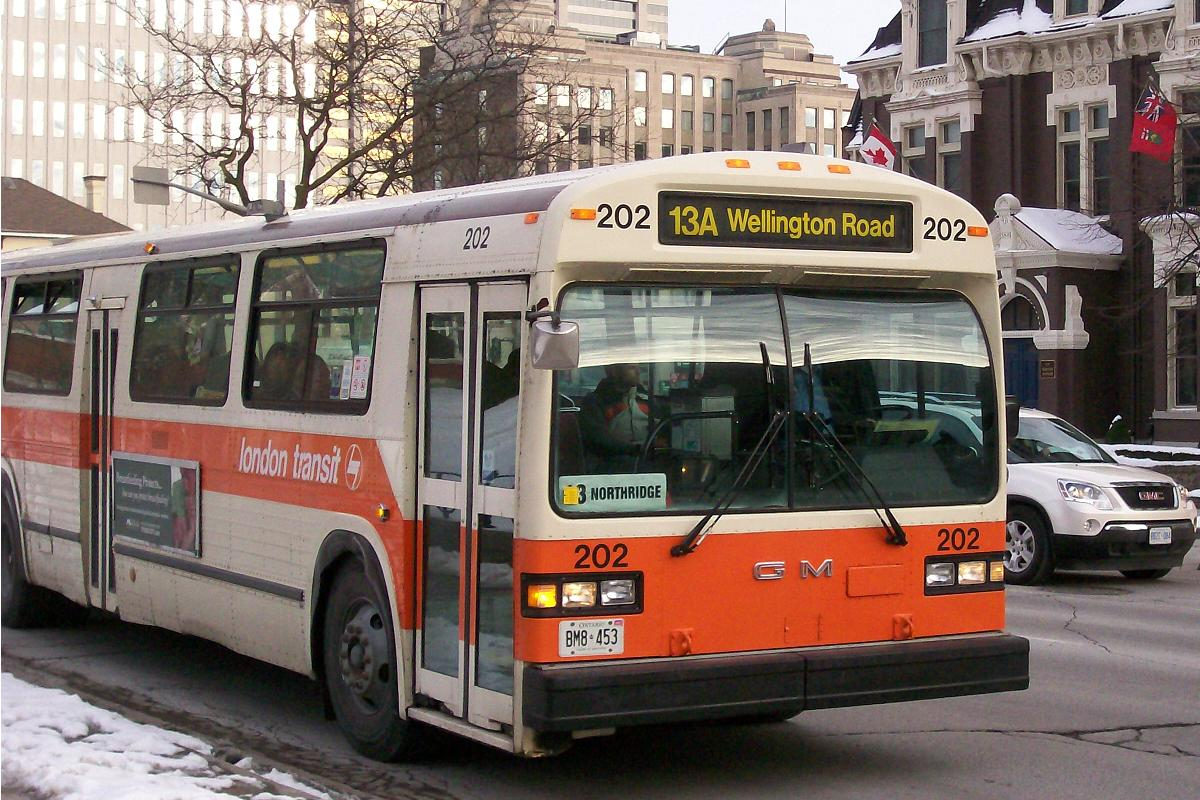
GM Classic operating in London, Ontario

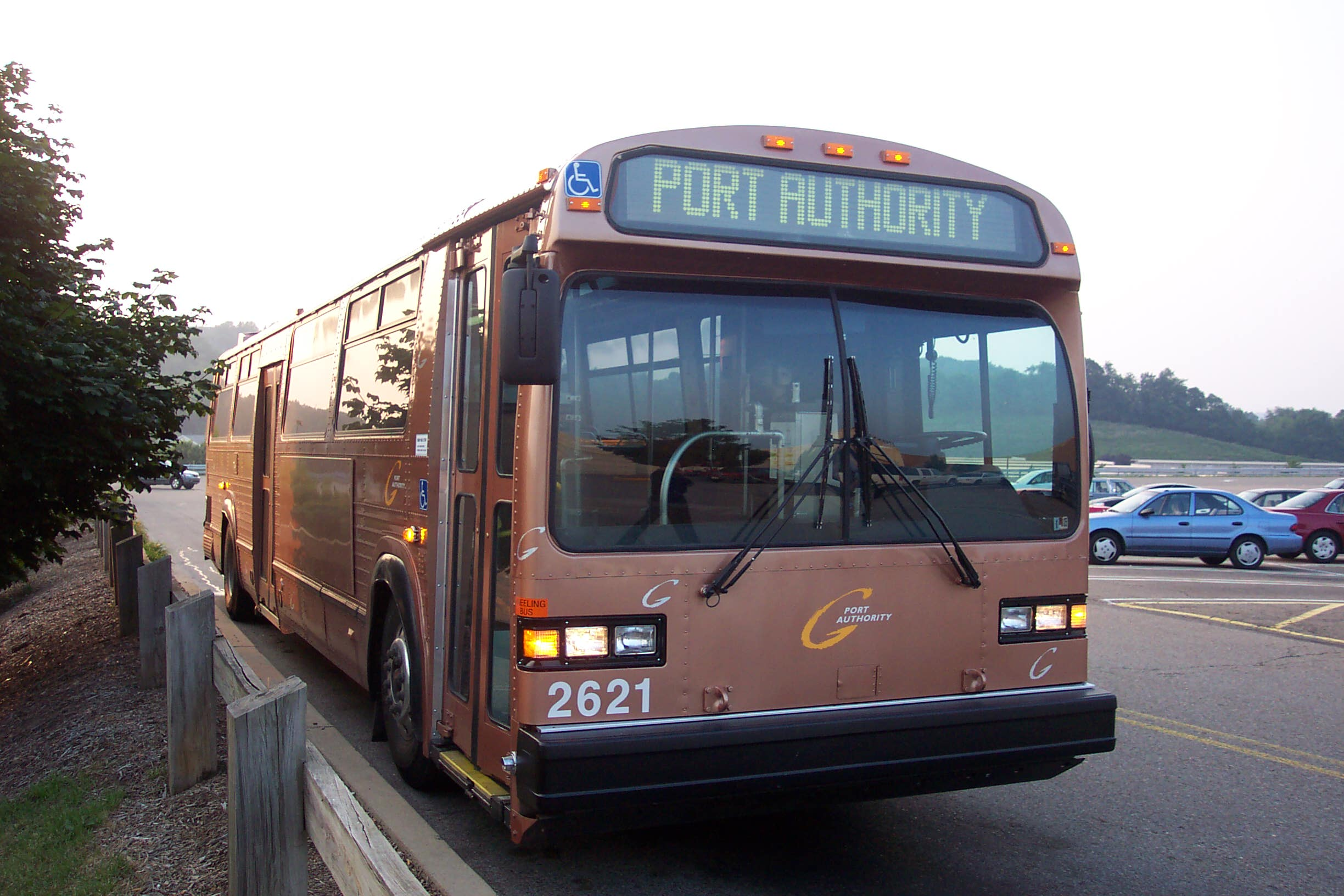
A refurbished and repainted 1996 NovaBus Classic for Port Authority of Allegheny County, one of 171 coaches that PAT had in service until 2011

The 60-foot version was not introduced until 1992, after MCI purchased the Classic design, and only 16 of these articulateds were ever built: 14 for Halifax Transit (Formerly Metro Transit), and two to Réseau de transport de la Capitale (RTC) (Quebec City, Quebec). NovaBus discontinued the articulated Classic in 1993. (This bus is not to be confused with the New Look TA60-102N, a 60-foot articulated bus manufactured by GMC in 1982, which had a Classic front end grafted onto a New Look body, which allowed for a wider front entrance.)

Seating capacity ranged from 39 to 52, and included wheelchair lifts which were optional for Canadian operators but were required for American operators, to comply with the Americans with Disabilities Act of 1990.

There were many optional features for the Classics, including the rear exit doors. Most orders specified the wide versions, but a narrower single-stream door was also available. A majority of orders had either large or no rear windows, but a few opted for a small rear window at the top of the rear cap. The rear window was dropped as an option for US-built buses due to revised air conditioning equipment and a stand-out exhaust deflector that extended the upper half of the rear cap by a few inches. The American-built Classics also had a larger front door due to having handicapped lifts installed. Another modification during the production run was the size of the front destination sign. A taller and wider version was offered from 1990 as more transit systems specified larger electronic signs. The major exception was Montreal, as MCI and NovaBus built an "M-version" which retained the narrow destination sign windows, and was ordered primarily by properties in the Montreal area.

Neither a 35-foot long nor a 96-inch wide version of the Classic was ever made. However, GM, MCI and NovaBus did build a commuter version with all forward-facing seats and no center exit.

From 2004 to 2005, Dupont Industries, a Quebec City-based company, refurbished and rebuild retired Classics into trolley-like sightseeing buses. Dupont's refurbished Classic was called a Dupont Cartier.

== Manufacturers ==
Company	Years built	Models
GMDD	1982–1987	TC40-102A TC40-102N TA60-102N
MCI	1987–1993	TC40-102A TC40-102N TC60-102N
NovaBus	1993–1997	TC40-102A TC40-102N TC60-102N
Dupont; Industries	2004-2005	"Cartier" (rebuilt GM, MCI and NovaBus Classics)

== See also ==
- List of buses
