= General Motors Diesel Division =

Marketing and customer service unit of General Motors

Coordinates: 43°1′0.06″N 81°10′19.02″W

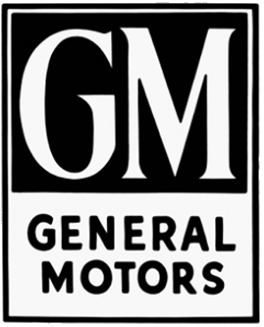
- Type: Subsidiary
- Industry: Marketing, customer service
- Founded: 1938
- Defunct: 1965; 61 years ago
- Fate: Merged with GM Detroit Diesel Engine Division: Detroit Diesel Engine Division became Detroit Diesel Corporation after majority share sold to the Penske Corporation; Detroit Diesel brand maintained under subsequent ownership structures
- Headquarters: Detroit, Michigan, United States,
- Products: Diesel engines
- Parent: General Motors

General Motors Diesel Division (GMDD) was a marketing and customer service unit of General Motors founded in 1938. It sought customers for GM's diesel engines, which had undergone major development during the 1930s. It was most active in association with GM's Detroit Diesel Engine Division, which produced lines of lightweight diesel engines that could be adapted to many uses including road vehicles, small boats, military equipment, construction and farm equipment, pumping, and auxiliary power generation. In 1939, Detroit Diesel Series 71 engines were installed in buses produced by Yellow Coach, who would be acquired by GM in 1943 to launch the GMC Truck and Coach Division. Uses for Detroit Diesel engines would proliferate during World War II and the postwar economic boom. The GM Cleveland Diesel Engine Division's products were sold to relatively few customers for mostly marine uses. GMDD developed a widespread international marketing, service, and parts distribution infrastructure for GM diesel engines in the postwar years.

In 1962 GM's Electro-Motive Division (EMD), which had its own marketing and service infrastructure from its years in the locomotive business, took over the production and marketing of large diesel engines formerly produced by the Cleveland Diesel Engine Division.

In 1965 GMDD was absorbed by the General Motors Detroit Diesel Engine Division.

General Motors Diesel Division is not to be confused with General Motors Diesel, Ltd., the Canadian subsidiary of EMD formed in 1949, or the Diesel Division of General Motors of Canada, the entity for General Motors of Canada's diesel equipment manufacturing operations formed in 1969.

== Products ==
Diesel engines produced by the General Motors Cleveland Diesel and Detroit Diesel Engine Divisions

== See also ==
- GMC
- Detroit Diesel
- Cleveland Diesel Engine Division
