= Quebec City tramway (1865–1948) =

Former streetcar system in Quebec city, Canada

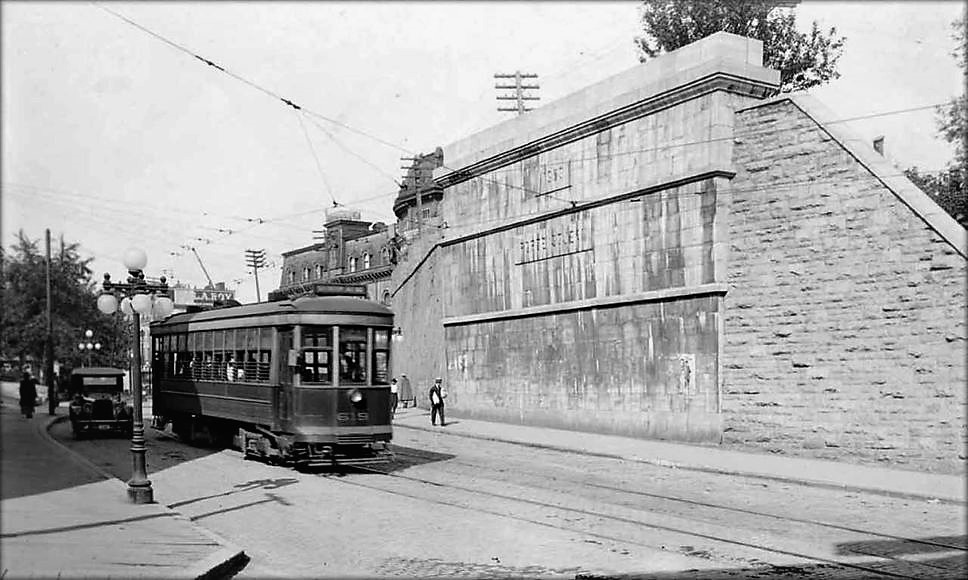
- Streetcar on Rue Saint-Jean circa 1930

Overview
- Locale: Quebec City, Quebec, Canada
- Transit type: Streetcar
- Number of lines: 11 at apogee

Operation
- Began operation: 1865 (horsecars); 1892 (electric streetcars)
- Ended operation: 1948
- Operator: Quebec Railway, Light & Power Company
- Character: Street running

The Quebec City tramway (1865–1948) was a streetcar system that started operations in 1865 with horsecars, electrified in 1897 and ceased operation in 1948. This former system is distinct from the planned modern line, known as the TramCité.

== Horsecars ==
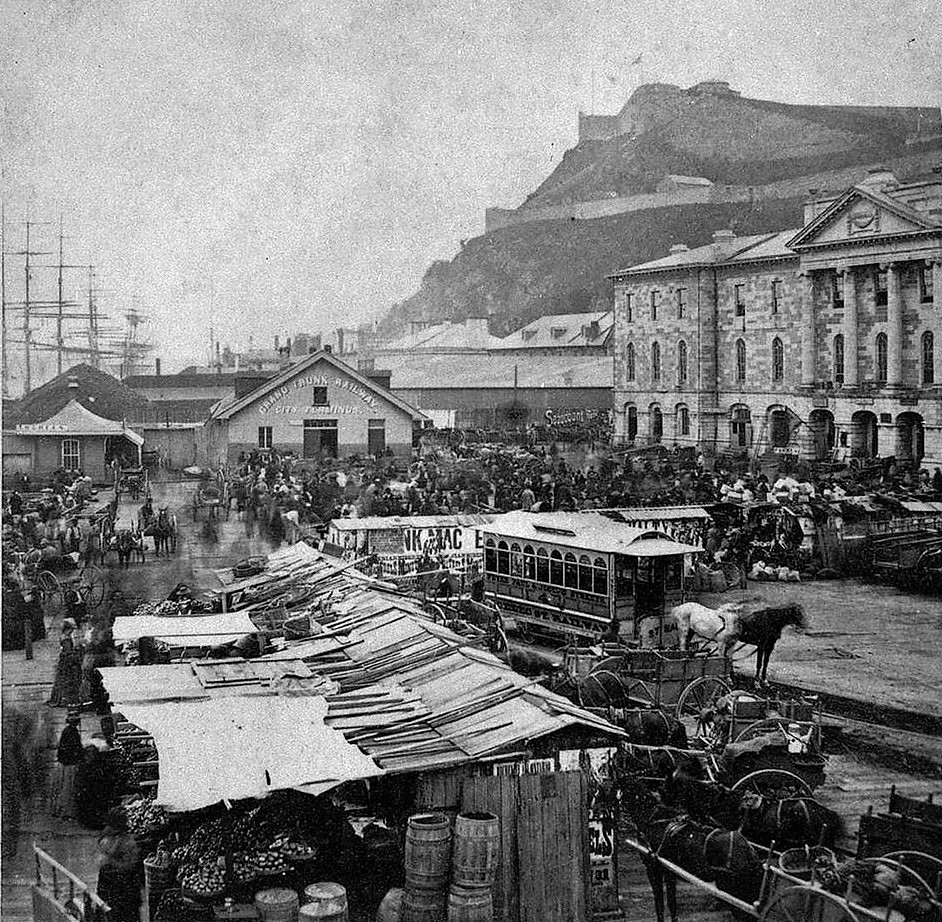
Champlain Market was the terminus of the first streetcar line.

In fall 1863, a group of local businessmen and public figures from Quebec City presented a petition at the Parliament of the Province of Canada for the incorporation of a streetcar company. Among them were Pierre Garneau and John Lemesurier, future mayors of Quebec City, entrepreneurs Guillaume-Eugène Chinic and Cérice Têtu and many others. The group was incorporated under the name Quebec Street Railway Company (QSRC) on October 15, 1863. It obtained the right to build a system for the city five neighbourhoods. Nevertheless, it was mainly the commercial and port sector of the Lower Town that interested the company. First, they established a horse-drawn omnibus between Champlain Market and St. Ours Street barrier. Wooden rails were embedded in the roadway in this corridor to create the first horsecar line. The service started on August 18, 1865. The arrival of streetcars disrupted centuries-old practices: a ticket cost 5 cents while a horse-drawn carriage varied between 25 and 50 cents. Coach drivers denounced unfair competition and some vehicles were vandalized, rails removed and drivers brutalized. Also, the city and the company were sometimes inconsistent, regarding for instance who was responsible for road maintenance. Moreover, for financial reasons, the company refused to expand its network to the Upper Town, which would also have benefited from public transport. In 1874, the QSRC proceeded to an extension toward Saint-Sauveur, which was not part of the city at the time, to build its depot and avoid paying taxes to the municipality.

Horse-drawn trams appeared in the Upper Town from 1878 onwards with the creation of a second company, the St. John Street Railway Company Ltd. It built a line initially linking the Château Frontenac to Rue De Salaberry through Rue St. Jean. The line was later extended to Rue des Érables. Stables were situated at the intersection with Philippe-Dorval Street.

== City electric trams ==
=== Electrification and networking ===
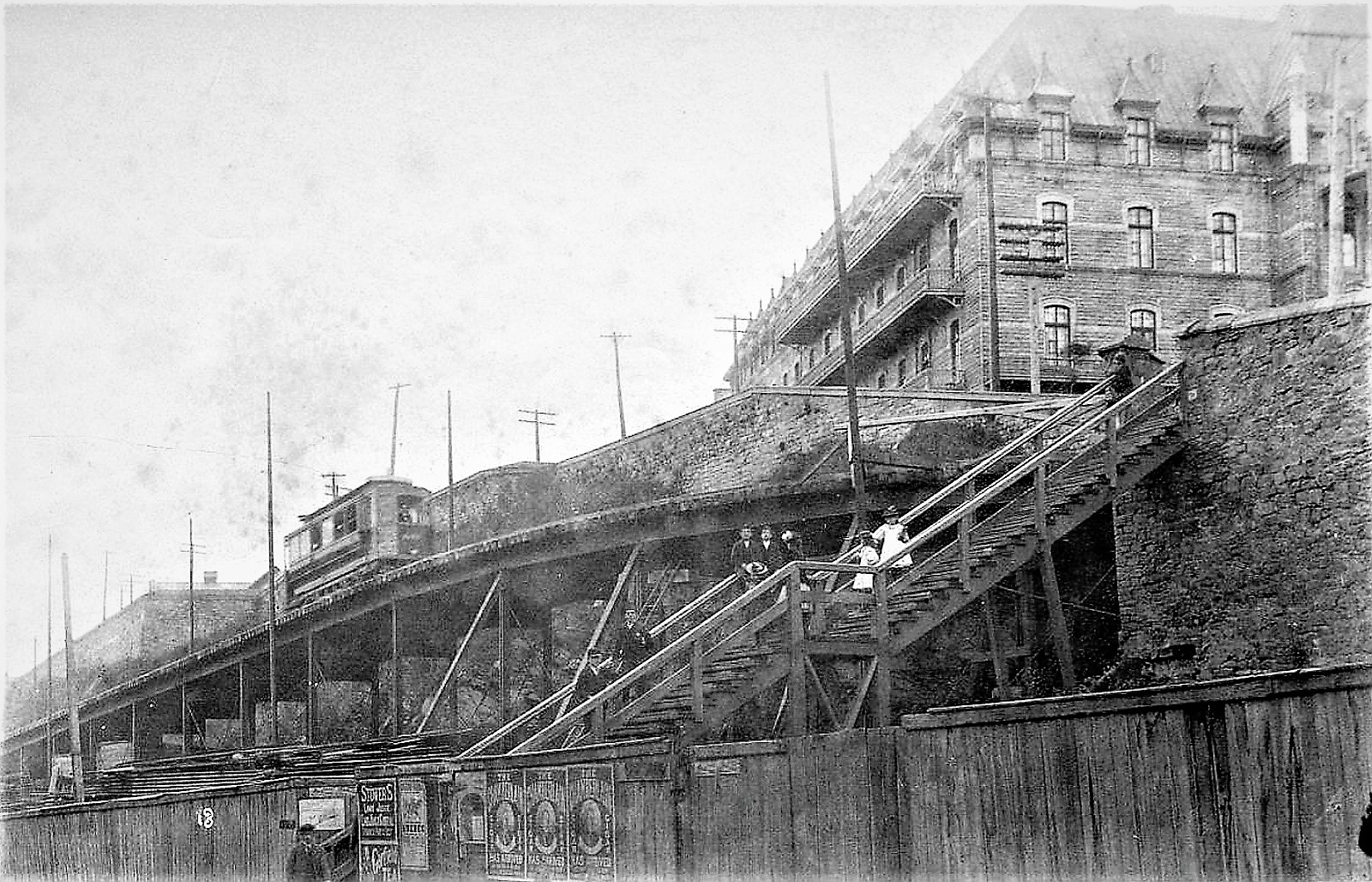
The construction of the metal trestle of Côte Dinan in 1897 finally allowed trams to travel between the lower and upper towns of Quebec City.

The desire to create a real electrified city system was felt throughout 1890s, especially with the arrival of the electric streetcars in Montreal in 1892. The Quebec, Montmorency and Charlevoix Railway Company and its president, businessman and engineer Horace Jansen Beemer, got an exclusive franchise from the Quebec City Council to this end. They created the Quebec District Railway Company, a subsidiary responsible for managing the city streetcar system. This subsidiary purchased two existing tram companies. Major works were needed: the Montmorency Electric Power Company had to modernize its facilities to provide the new energy demand from the electric network, a metal structure was essential for tram traffic between the Upper and Lower town with a very smooth slope, St. John's Gate (Porte Saint-Jean) was demolished to improve traffic flow with Old Quebec, etc. In the summer of 1897, the four lines of this united and electrified public transport system were opened. Côte Dinan trestle, connecting St. Paul Street to the Hôtel-Dieu de Québec, received its first trams in December.

From then on, trams would be pulled by horses only when they broke down.

Tramway lines in 1897
Line	Route	Opening
	The "red diamond line" served the Lower Town. It linked Champlain Market to Saint-Sauveur (Aqueduc Street)	July 19, 1897
	The "Maltese Cross line" served the Upper Town. It linked the Château Frontenac to Mapple Street through St. John Street and the Grande Allée	August 25, 1897 — September 16, 1897
	The "white circle on green square line" connected the lower and the upper town through Côte d'Abraham. It linked the Château Frontenac to Victoria Park	August 1897
	The "white circle line" connected the lower and the upper town through Côte Dinan trestle. It linked the Château Frontenac to Champlain Market	December 29, 1897

New streetcars built in New York could normally accommodate 25 to 27 passengers but sometimes up to 50 people; these streetcars were equipped with heaters. This new public transport participated in the rapid expansion of the city toward Ville-Montcalm, which was growing in population and confirming its residential character.

=== Expansion, apogee and decline ===
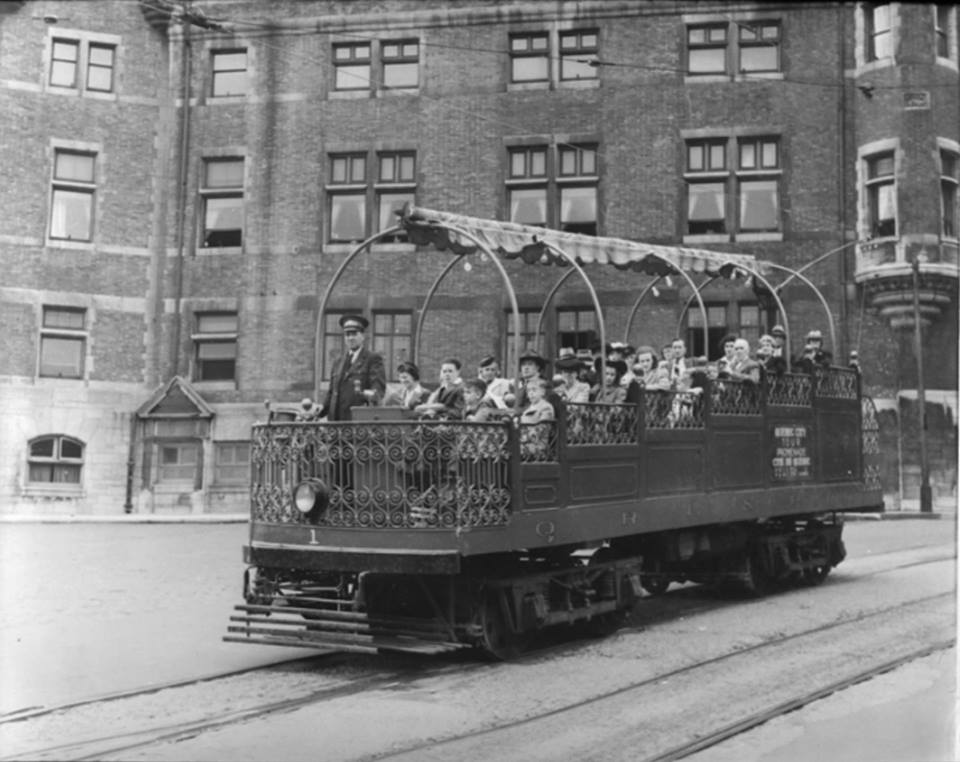
Sightseeing streetcar in Place d'Armes.

In 1899, railway and power companies merged to form the powerful Quebec Railway Light & Power Company, a trust in the power and transport sectors for the whole Quebec City area. This company, later known under the name Quebec Power, would run the tramway until its closure in 1948.

At the turn of the 20th century, snow plow cars and snow sweepers were introduced to clear snow off the streetcar tracks.

On 18 June 1910, observation car service was started, and operated between mid-May and mid-October. The open-air car had six rows of tiered double seats. Entrance was by stairs located at the rear of the car. The fare was 50 cents for a complete tour, or 25 cents for a shorter evening tour. Observation car service lasted until autumn 1947.

In 1910, the network was expanded to Sillery and in 1912, to Beauport. The tramway was at its peak and covered almost the entire city. In 1932, the network stretched from Sillery to Montmorency. At the time, 11 lines in total were in service.

Tramway lines in 1932
#	Line	Terminus	
1	Saint-Sauveur	Champlain Market	Saint-Malo Industrial Park
2	Saint-Vallier	Carré Parent	Saint-Charles Cemetery
3	Limoilou	Château Frontenac	Externat Saint-Jean-Eudes
4	Exposition	Place D'Youville (Quebec)	Exhibition Park
5	Charlesbourg	1st Ave / Rue des Lilas	3rd Ave / 10th Street
6	St. John Street	Avenue des Érables	City Hall of Quebec City
7	Grande Allée	Avenue des Érables	Château Frontenac
8	Saint-Sacrement	Champlain Market	École de Chimie et des Mines
9	Sillery	Avenue des Érables	Maguire Avenue
-	Québec - Montmorency	Gare du Palais	Montmorency Falls
11	Kent House	Rue de la Couronne	Kent House

Starting 29 March 1927, the streetcar intersection at Rue Saint-Jean and Rue des Glacis was enhanced by the installation of electro-magnetic switching. Previously, the motorman had get off the streetcar and manually move the switch points with a switch iron. With the enhancement, the motorman could change the switch direction without leaving the streetcar.

From 1937 onwards, buses' popularity was increasing and caused the disappearance of the trams. On May 26, 1948, the last line, line 1 serving Saint-Sauveur, was permanently closed. Streetcar 812, the last to run in the city, ended service at the Limoilou workshops by midnight. The next day 140 buses took over service.

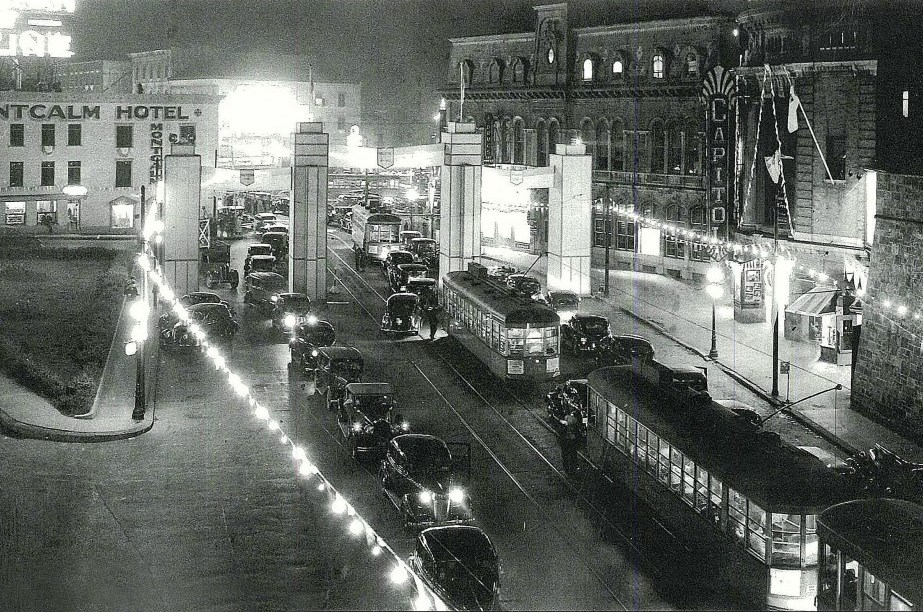
Streetcars at Place D'Youville in 1938.

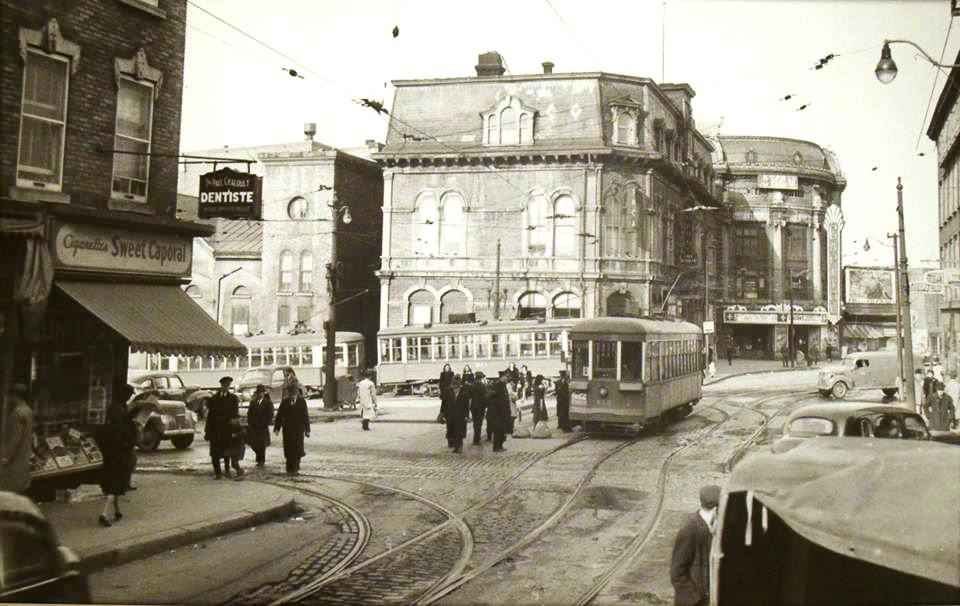
Streetcars at Place D'Youville in 1944.

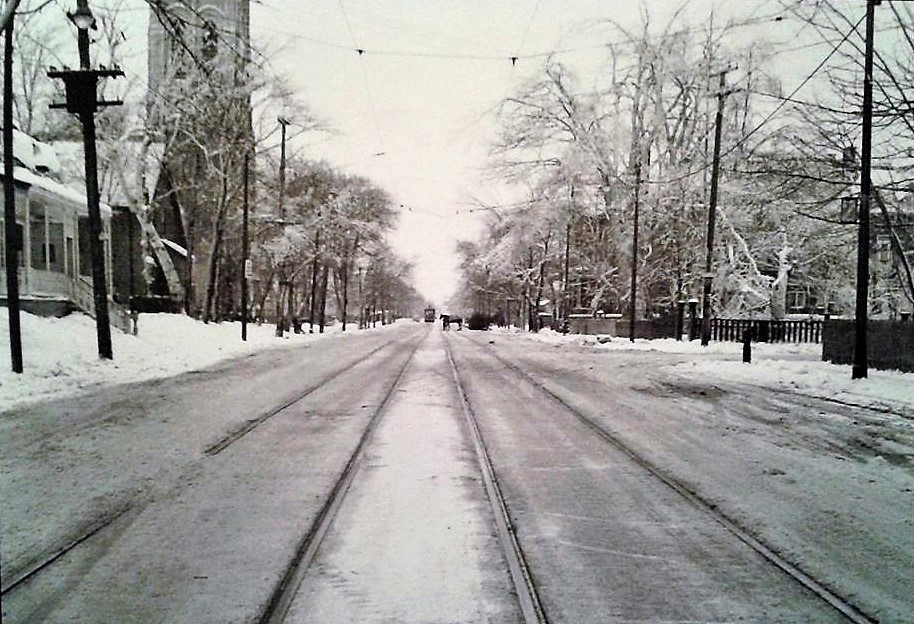
Rails, Grande Allée, 1945.

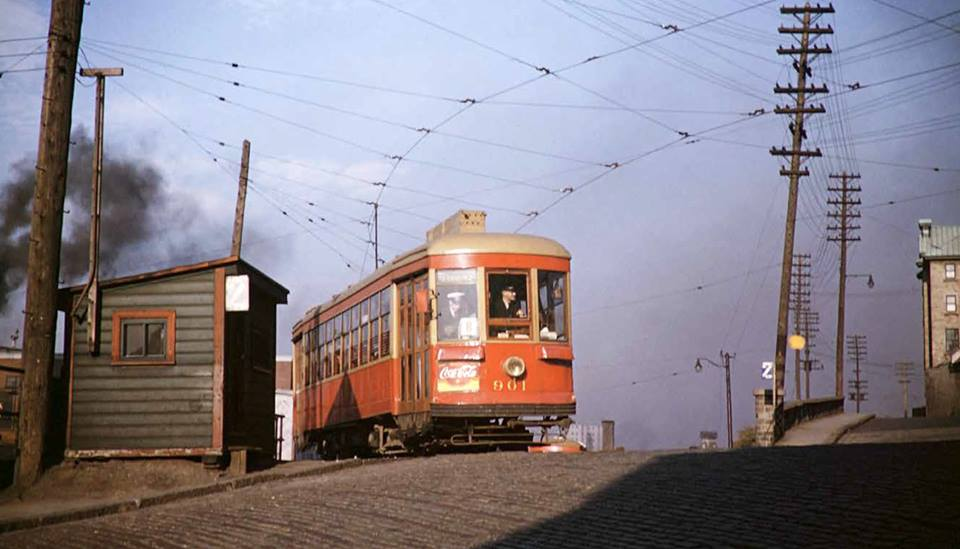
Tram 901 in 1947.

== See also ==
- Streetcars in Montreal
