= ÀVélo =

Bike sharing service

àVélo

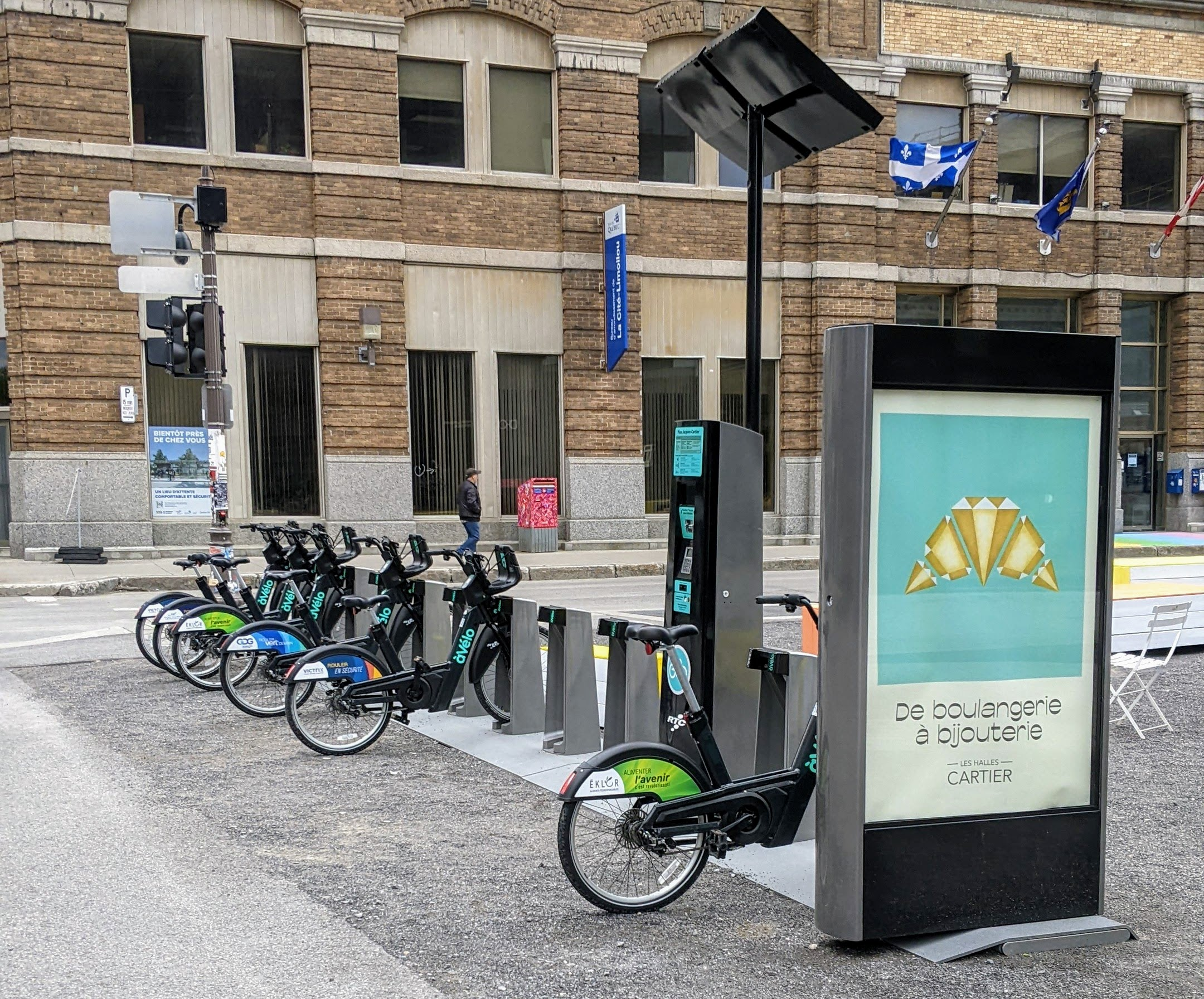

Overview
- Owner: Réseau de transport de la Capitale
- Locale: Quebec City, Quebec
- Transit type: Bicycle sharing system
- Number of stations: 225
- Website: https://aveloquebec.ca/

Operation
- Began operation: July 9, 2021; 4 years ago
- Operator(s): Capitale Mobilité

àVélo is a bike sharing service in Quebec City. Launched in 2021, the network now consists of 225 stations and 2,300 bicycles as of 2026. The system is seasonal, from May 1st to October 31st, but was extended to November 15th in 2025.

== History ==
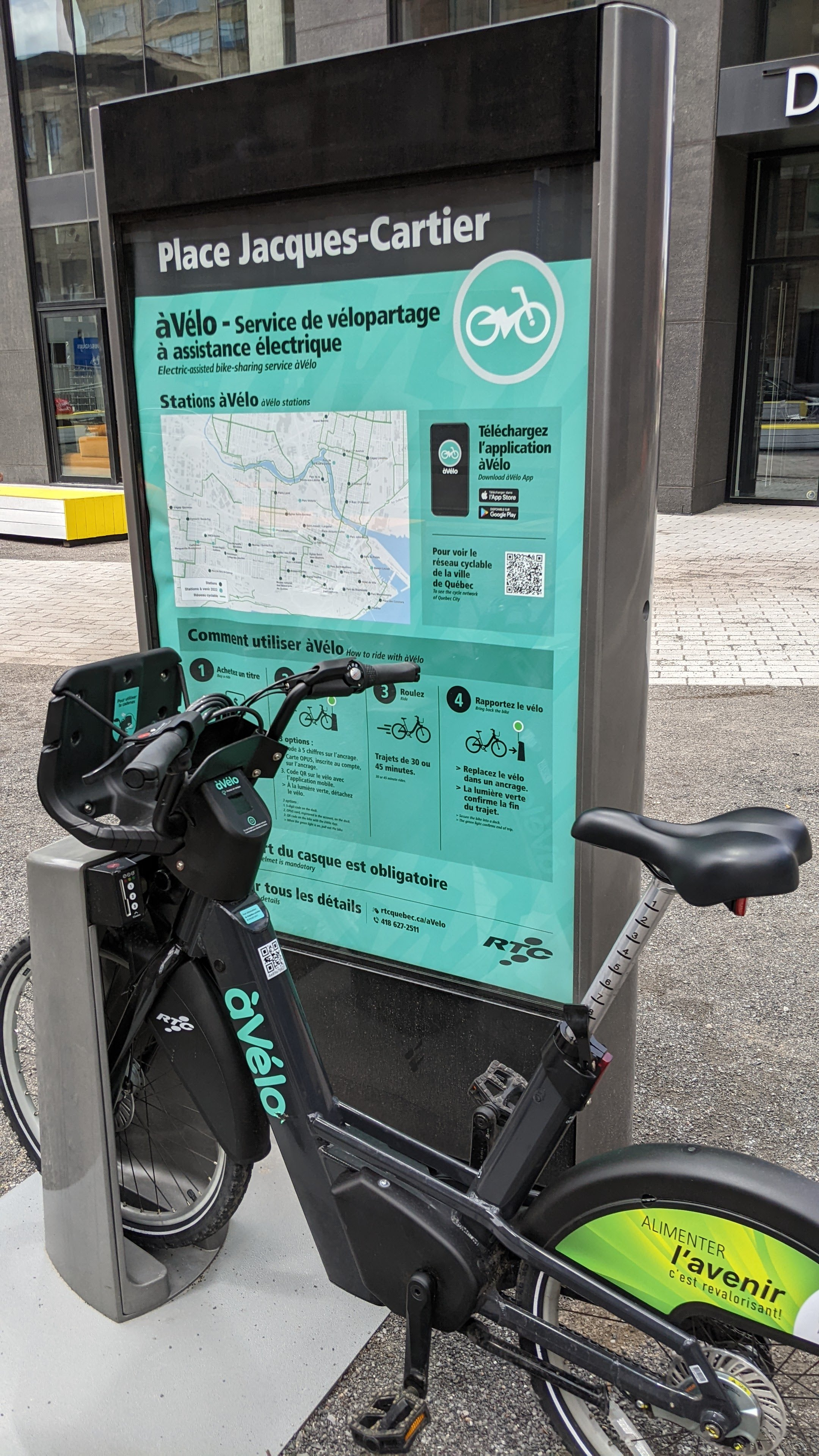
A bicycle at the Place Jacques-Cartier station.

àVélo was launched for the first time on July 9, 2021. During this initial season, 10 stations and 100 electric-assist bicycles were deployed in downtown Quebec City, which became the first city in Canada with an entirely electric-assist network, an essential feature due to the city’s topography.

Initially, the service was planned to grow annually from 2021 to 2024 to reach 100 stations and 1,000 bicycles. Its rapid success led to the announcement of an additional expansion plan that will allow it to serve a larger area by deploying up to 330 stations and 3,300 bicycles by 2028.

In 2025, the operating season was extended to allow for longer use in the fall. The service’s closing date was moved from October 31 to November 15.

== Operations ==
Lyft Urban Solutions (previously known as PBSC) is the provider of the network’s equipment and technological system. Capitale Mobilité, a limited partnership of Réseau de transport de la Capitale, is responsible for planning and operations. Daily logistics are outsourced to the company Velosolutions, which includes rebalancing stations and maintaining bicycles.

=== Bike ===
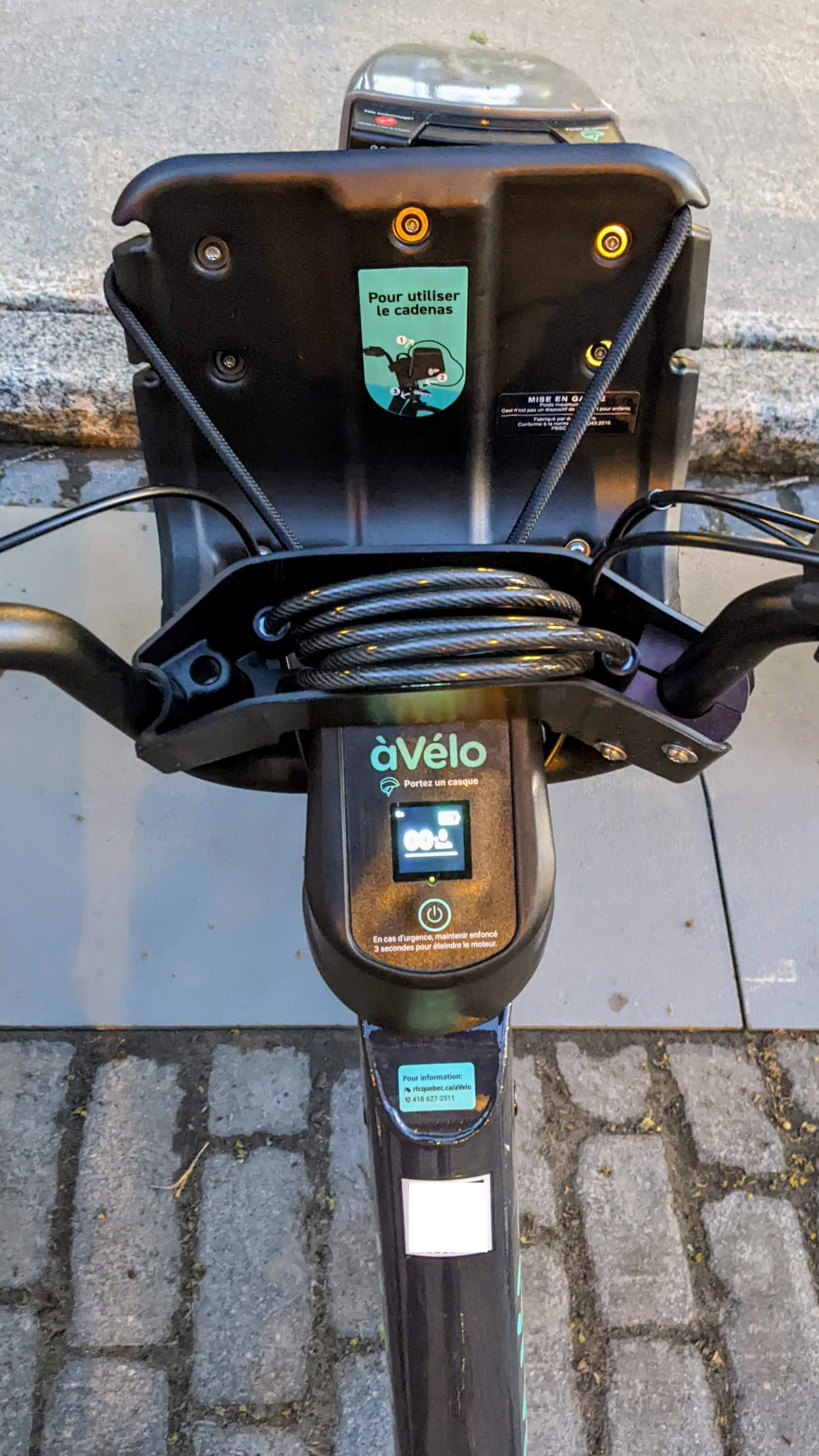
The bicycles feature a storage basket and an integrated lock.

The service uses the E-FIT model from the Quebec-based manufacturer Devinci. Weighing 27 kg, it is powered by a 250-watt Brose electric-assist motor limited to 32 km/h. It features a 3-speed twist handle to adjust pedaling cadence according to the terrain. The bicycle is equipped with an LCD screen displaying trip duration, speed, and battery charge level. It also transmits its location data via GPS.

=== Stations ===
There are currently two types of stations: electrified and solar-powered. In the first case, the station is connected to the electrical grid and allows bicycles to be recharged. In the second type, solar energy only powers the service terminal and does not charge the bicycles. The bicycles are manually swapped by employees. Solar stations can however be moved more easily and they offer the possibility to test locations, even when it is further from the electrical grid. The system maintains a 50-50 ratio of solar-powered versus electrified stations.

== Ridership ==
In 2023, the target of 350,000 trips for the full season was surpassed as early as August. By the end of the season, nearly twice that number of trips had been completed. In 2024, the goal of 1.1 million trips was also exceeded in September, more than a month before the season ended. That same year, the busiest station was Place D'Youville, with 34,276 departures. The 2025 season broke yet other records, with close to two million registered trips. More than 42,000 different clients used the bike-sharing system.

Evolution of àVélo
Year	Stations	Bikes	Journeys
2021	10	100	29,100
2022	40	400	185,200
2023	74	780	670,800
2024	115	1,300	1,281,000
2025	165	1,800	1,980,000
2026	225	2,300	-
2027	280	2,800	-
2028	330	3,300	-
