= Citadis Spirit =

Light rail vehicle custom-made for North American market

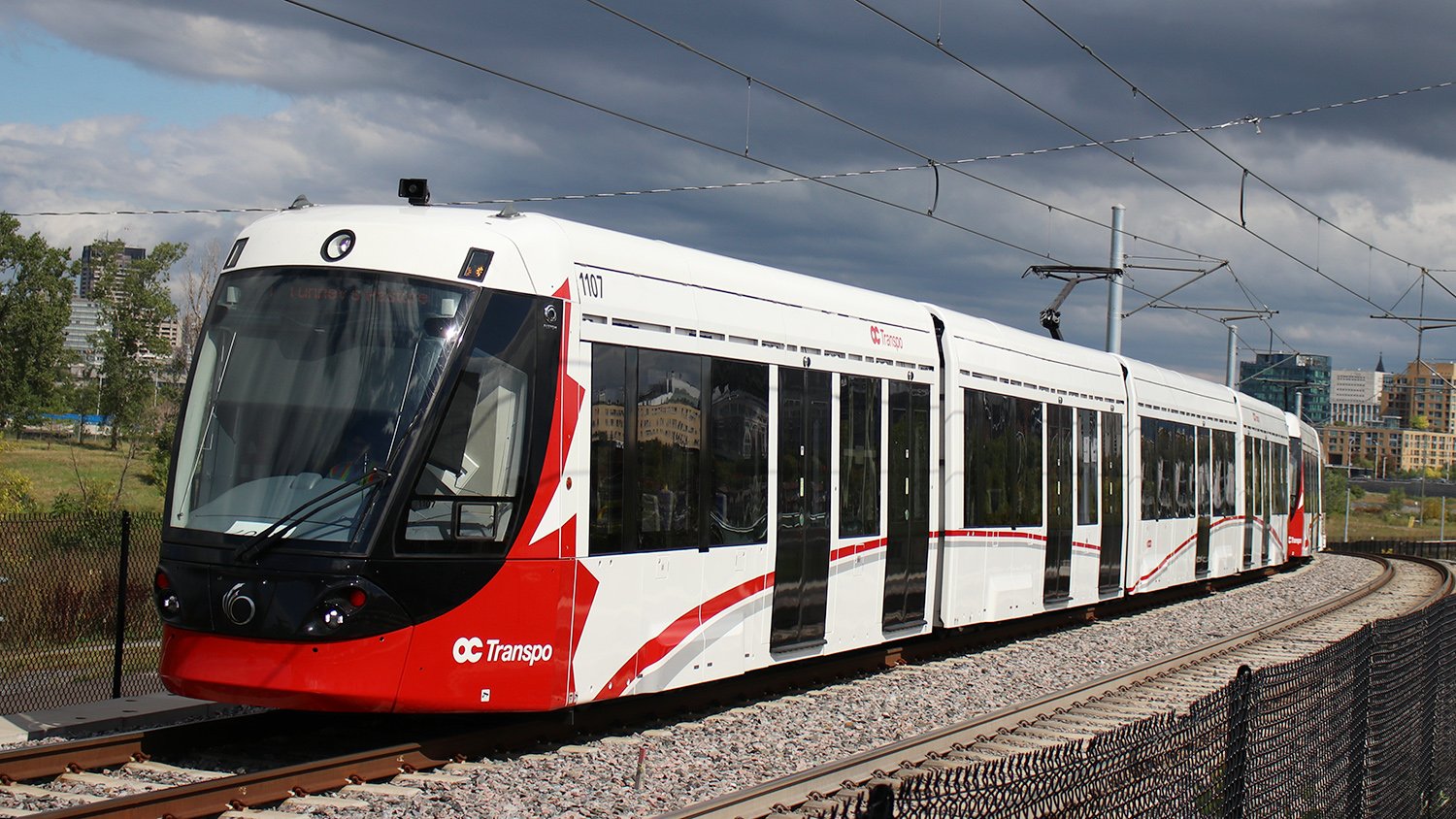
- A Citadis Spirit running on Line 1 in Ottawa
- In service: 2019–present (Ottawa); 2025–present (Toronto); TBA (Peel Region); TBA (Quebec City)
- Manufacturer: Alstom
- Built at: Hornell, New York; Sorel-Tracy, Quebec; Kingston, Ontario; Brampton, Ontario
- Family name: Citadis
- Entered service: September 14, 2019; 7 years ago
- Number under construction: 95
- Number built: 38
- Capacity: 190–370 depending on configuration
- Lines served: Line 1 (O-Train); Line 6 (Toronto subway); Hurontario LRT (Metrolinx; planned); Quebec City tramway (planned)

Specifications
- Car length: 30 to 59 m (98 to 194 ft) depending on configuration
- Width: 2,650 mm (8 ft 8 3/8 in)
- Height: 3,600 mm (11 ft 9 3/4 in)
- Doors: 4–9 per side depending on configuration
- Articulated sections: 3–5 depending on configuration
- Wheel diameter: 640–570 mm (25–22 in) (new–worn)
- Wheelbase: 1.9 m (6 ft 3 in)
- Maximum speed: 105 km/h (65 mph)
- Traction motors: Alstom 4LMA 1648 130 kW (170 hp)
- Electric systems: Overhead line, 750 V DC/1,500 V DC
- Current collection: Pantograph
- Bogies: Alstom Iponam
- Minimum turning radius: 25 metres (82 ft)
- Track gauge: 1,435 mm (4 ft 8 1/2 in) standard gauge

The Citadis Spirit is a low-floor articulated light rail vehicle originally developed by Alstom for Ottawa's O-Train. It is marketed as part of its Citadis family, which includes other models of light rail vehicles, and is based on the Citadis Dualis, and, like the Dualis, with pivoting bogies.

The Citadis Spirit is designed for both city-centre and suburban operation. It is designed with suspended articulations, similar to most North American low-floor LRVs. The vehicle can be used for both street-running allowing boarding from street or curb, and high-speed travel up to 105 km/h (65 mph).

The first order for the Citadis Spirit came from the City of Ottawa government for use on the new Confederation Line opened in September 2019. The second order came from the Government of Ontario's Metrolinx transit agency for Line 6 of the Toronto subway, which opened in 2025.

== Options ==
The Citadis Spirit is constructed using four types of modules, not all of which are used on the same vehicle:

Module description	Module letter	Number of bogies	Doors per side	Pantograph
Cab	C	1	2	No
Short centre	S	1	0	Yes
Long centre	L	2	1	Yes
Intermediate	I	1	2	No

Promotional videos illustrate four configurations for the Citadis Spirit, while the vendor brochure illustrates only three. The following table combines data from the two sources:

Length	Modules used	Maximum passenger capacity	Doors per side	Comments
30 m (98 ft)	C+S+C	190	4	
37 m (121 ft)	C+L+C	265	5	
48.5 m (159 ft)	C+I+L+C	340	7	As used in Ottawa but configured for 300 passengers.
59 m (194 ft)	C+I+L+I+C	370	9	

Promotional videos suggest that a customer can purchase a shorter vehicle and extend it later by adding modules. However, as illustrated in videos, if the C+S+C version were purchased, the short-centre (S) module would need to be replaced by the long-centre (L) module. The vehicle must have one centre module, either short or long, as only these carry the pantograph.

Power options in addition to pantograph pickup include:

- APS technology: Power supplied from a conductor built into the ground with the same performance as with pantograph electrical pickup.
- Batteries: On-board energy storage batteries for medium to long-range, off-wire travel.
- Super-capacitors: On-board energy storage devices for short-distance use requiring in-station recharging.

== Manufacturing ==
Manufacturing for the Citadis Spirit takes place in several locations. Major parts manufacturing occurs in Hornell, New York, bogies are manufactured in Sorel-Tracy, Quebec, and final assembly takes place in Ottawa, Ontario. A second final assembly plant has since been established in Brampton, Ontario.

== Orders ==
=== City of Ottawa ===
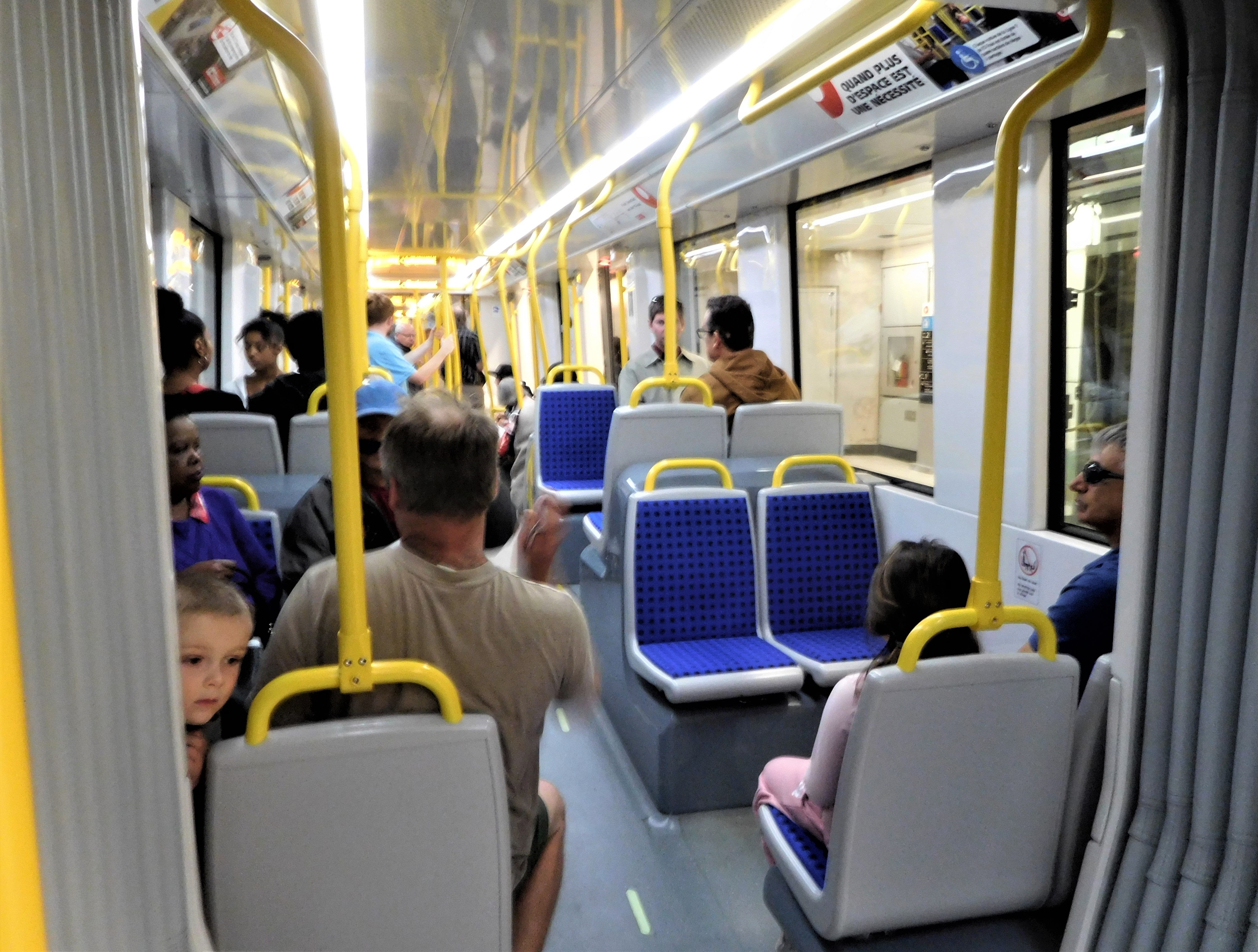
Inside view

Alstom supplied 34 Citadis Spirit vehicles for the City of Ottawa's Confederation Line, which opened on September 14, 2019. Alstom will also provide maintenance services for 30 years to Rideau Transit Group (RTG), the consortium responsible for the design, construction, financing, and maintenance of the line. The trains were built in Hornell, New York and Sorel-Tracy, Quebec, with final assembly in Ottawa. The Ottawa vehicles have 27 percent Canadian content.

The vehicles consist of four modules: two cab modules each with two doors per side, a centre module with 1 door on each side and an intermediate module with 2 doors on each side. The total length of all four modules is 48.4 metres (159 ft). The vehicle is configured for 300 passengers.

In June 2017, it was announced that Alstom had been awarded the contract to provide vehicles for Phase 2 of the Confederation Line. The order was placed for 38 additional Citadis Spirit vehicles, bringing the total amount of Spirit vehicles on Confederation line to 72.

==== Vehicle issues ====
By early October 2019, the automated doors of the vehicles used by Ottawa's Confederation Line experienced faults if pried open or held back by passengers; this resulted in numerous service disruptions, some lasting up to 90 minutes due to a lack of proper procedures to isolate and disable the faulty doors while a train was in service. The vehicles also began encountering integration issues with Thales' SelTrac train control system that led to the on-board computer for some trains in service needing to be rebooted, causing delays of up to 20 to 30 minutes.

Reliability gradually improved in November and December 2019. However, on December 31, 2019, electrical problems caused by improperly cleaned electrical contacts on the roof of the trains caused disruptions to passengers. Then, throughout January 2020, service continued to suffer due to a combination of train and track switch failures. The trains' interior heating systems have been reported to be insufficient in Ottawa's sub-zero winter temperatures, forcing OC Transpo to consider adding heaters to the vehicles. A manufacturing defect with the inductors used by the vehicles led to numerous electrical failures in inclement weather. On January 30, 2020, the Confederation Line reached an all-time operational low when it was short five trains due to "recurring mechanical and electrical issues". Only eight to nine trains ran during the day. The Confederation Line is expected to field 13 working trains during rush hour.

On July 2, 2020, cracks were found on two wheels of a vehicle during routine maintenance activities. A subsequent inspection of all vehicles found two more wheels with cracks, for a total of four across three different vehicles. As a result, half of the fleet is currently kept out of service each day so that every wheel on each vehicle can be inspected before the vehicle can be put back into service. On July 10, 2020, the Transportation Safety Board of Canada (TSB) launched an independent investigation into the matter. On September 16, 2020, the City announced that Alstom had determined that the root cause of the issue was an improperly aligned screw that caused stress on the wheel, resulting in the cracks. Alstom said it would replace every wheel in the fleet by early 2021. The TSB's independent investigation continued at that time. As of August 3, 2021, the wheels on 32 vehicles had been replaced.

On August 8, 2021, an out-of-service train partially derailed when a single wheel came off of the tracks after crossing a switch. All vehicles were pulled from service the following day pending a root-cause investigation. The TSB, again, deployed investigators to assess the incident; it did not, however, launch a formal investigation. The initial findings by RTG suggested that a fault within the axle–bearing assembly was potentially the cause of the derailment.

On July 23, 2022, all trains that had travelled more than 175,000 kilometres (109,000 mi) were pulled out of service for additional inspections after an inspection found a failure in one of the wheel hub assemblies. A transit advocacy group, Ottawa Transit Riders, said having another major issue less than three years after the system launched "raises some concerns".

On July 17, 2023, all train service was suspended due to another bearing issue that was discovered during a routine inspection.

On January 21, 2026, a spalling issues was discovered in the cartridge-bearing assemblies, causing OC Transpo to withdraw all trains with axles that have more than 100,000 kilometres (62,000 mi) of use from service for maintenance.

=== Metrolinx ===
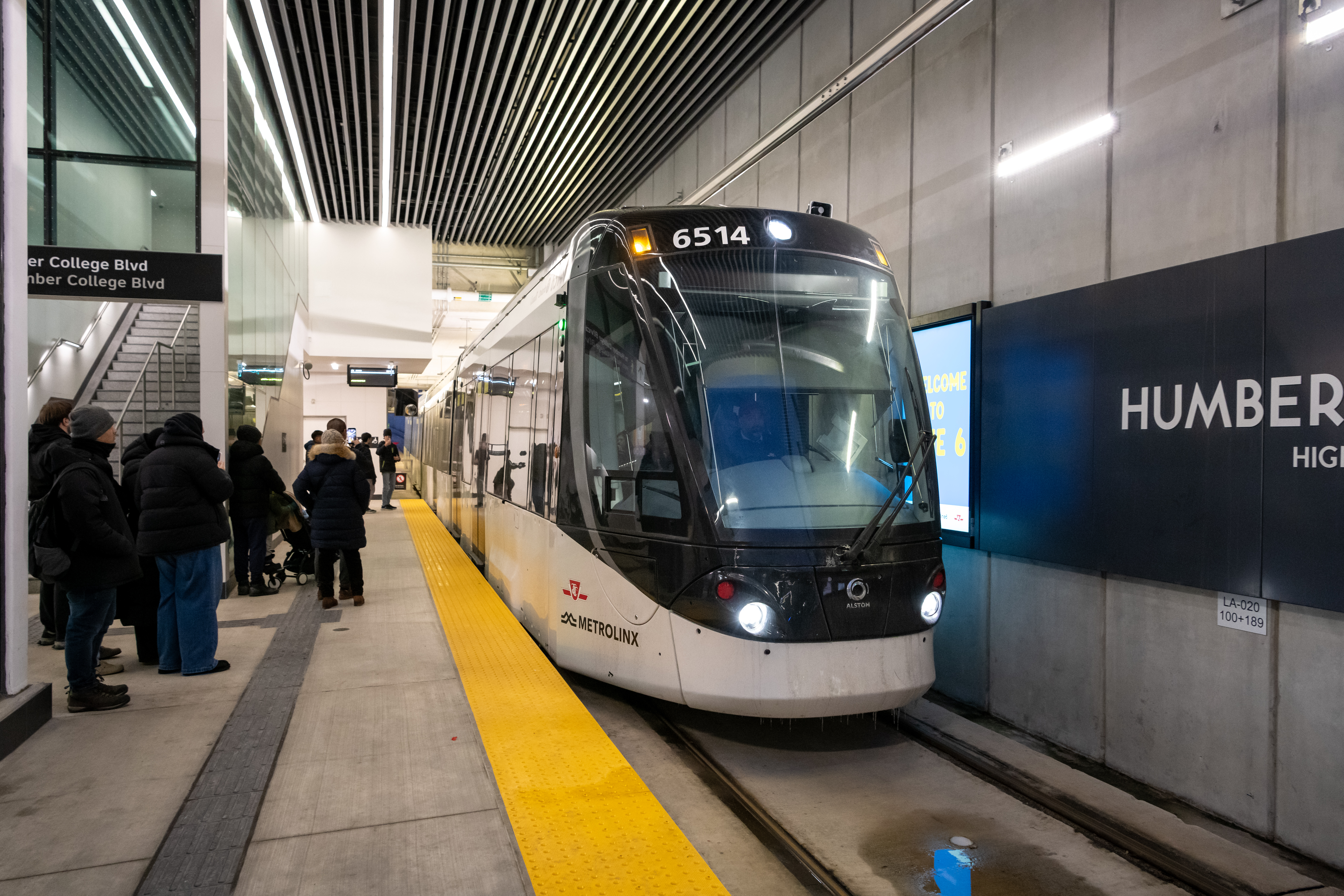
A Citadis Spirit at Humber College station

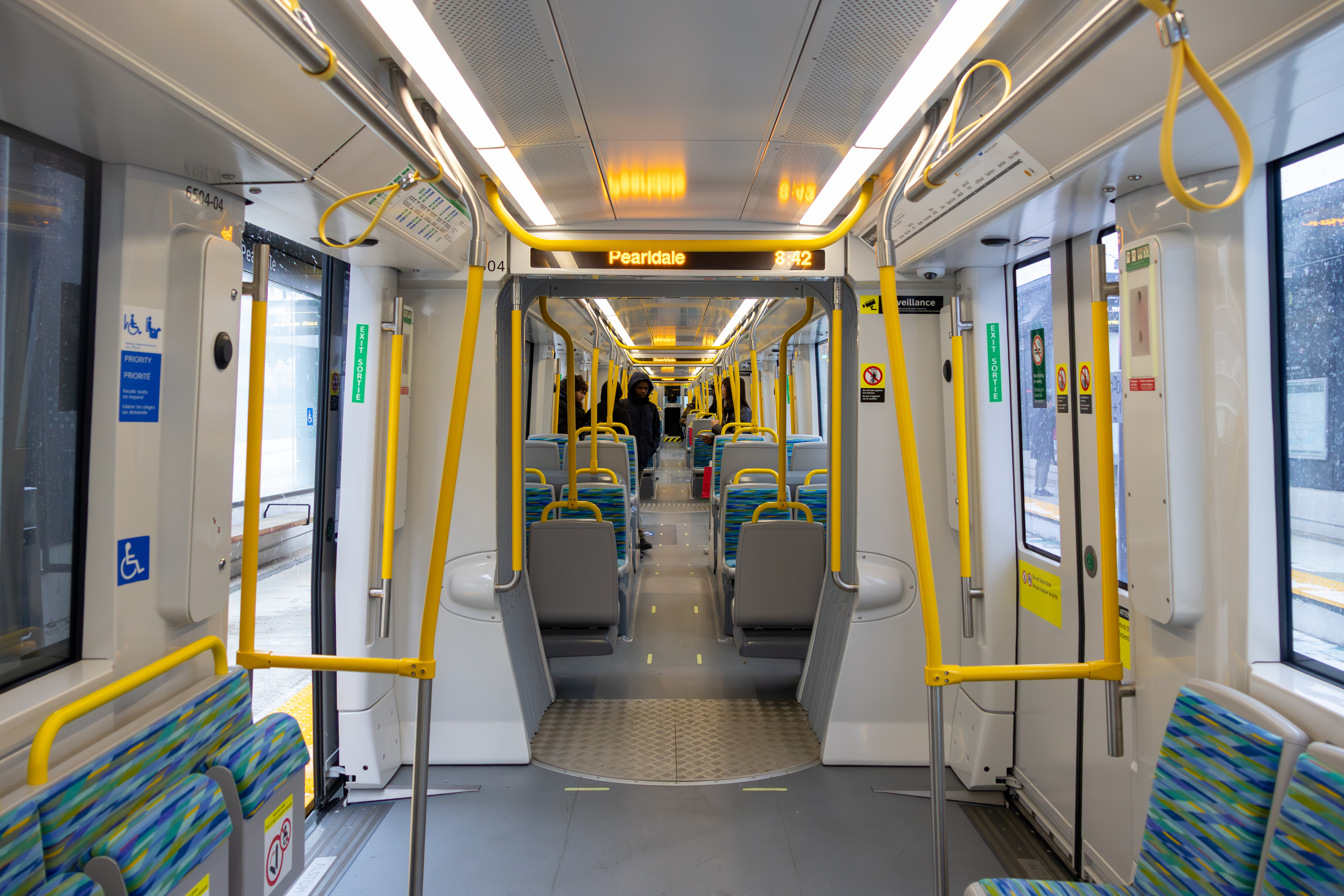
Inside view of a Citadis Spirit on Line 6 Finch West

Metrolinx, a provincial transit agency within the province of Ontario, has placed an order for 61 Citadis Spirit vehicles to serve future light rail lines in the Greater Toronto Area. Metrolinx assigned 17 vehicles from the order to serve Line 6 Finch West in Toronto, which opened in 2025. The remaining 44 vehicles will go to the Hurontario LRT in Peel Region. To fill the Metrolinx order, Alstom has set up a plant in Brampton, Ontario, that will create 100 to 120 full-time direct jobs. In September 2020, the Brampton plant was assembling its first Citadis, which was delivered to the Finch West LRT maintenance and storage facility in late July 2021.

The Metrolinx website described the passenger capacity of the 48.4-metre (159 ft) vehicle ordered as 120 seated and 216 standing. The vehicle will have space for wheelchairs, strollers and (outside of peak hours) bicycles. (The vendor brochure gives a maximum capacity of 340 passengers for that length of vehicle.) Metrolinx expects to operate the vehicles at approximately 60 kilometres per hour (37 mph) although Alstom lists the Citadis' maximum speed as 100 kilometres per hour (62 mph).

Metrolinx placed the Citadis Spirit order mainly because it was concerned that Bombardier might not be able deliver an order of Flexity Freedom vehicles in time to open Line 5 Eglinton, a light rail line under construction in Toronto. If Bombardier failed to deliver, Metrolinx would be liable for heavy penalties of $500,000 per day payable to the consortium building that line. Thus, the Citadis Spirit order acted as insurance in case Bombardier fails to complete the Flexity Freedom order on time. If Bombardier is late, then the 44 vehicles for the Hurontario LRT could completely service Line 5 Eglinton.

=== Quebec City ===
In April 2022, Quebec City started a selection process for a supplier of light-rail vehicles. In February 2023, Alstom Transport Canada Inc. was chosen as the successful bidder. Besides supplying the vehicles, it will also maintain them for 30 years. Before Alstom won the contract, the tramway project called for vehicles to be 43 metres (141 ft) long and have a certain distinctive outward appearance, suggesting customization.

The contract calls for the construction of 34 Citadis Spirit LRVs, with an option for 5 more to handle any increase in ridership. The contract is worth $1.34 billion, of which $569 million is for building the vehicles and $768 million is for 30 years of maintenance. The vehicles will be designed in Saint-Bruno-de-Montarville and assembled at Alstom's factory in La Pocatière. The contract requires that the vehicles have 25 percent local content; however, many parts will be manufactured in Mexico. Alstom will provide operator training for RTC staff.
