= Place D'Youville (Quebec) =

Square in Québec City, Canada

- City square
- {{{other_names}}}
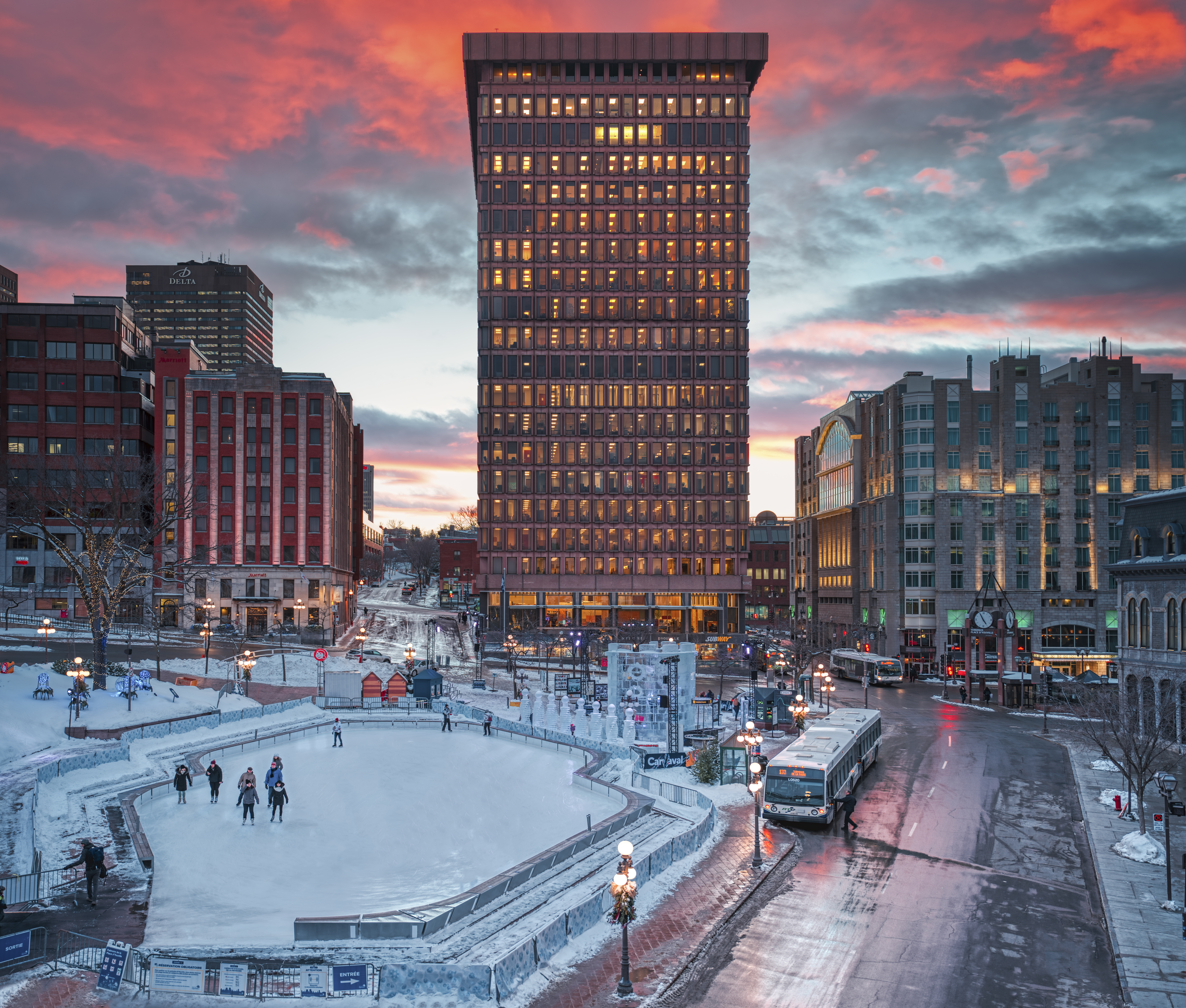
- Place D'Youville and its skating rink
- Dedicated to: Marie-Marguerite d'Youville
- Location: Quebec City, Quebec, Canada
- Location within Quebec City
- Coordinates: 46°48′44″N 71°12′51″W

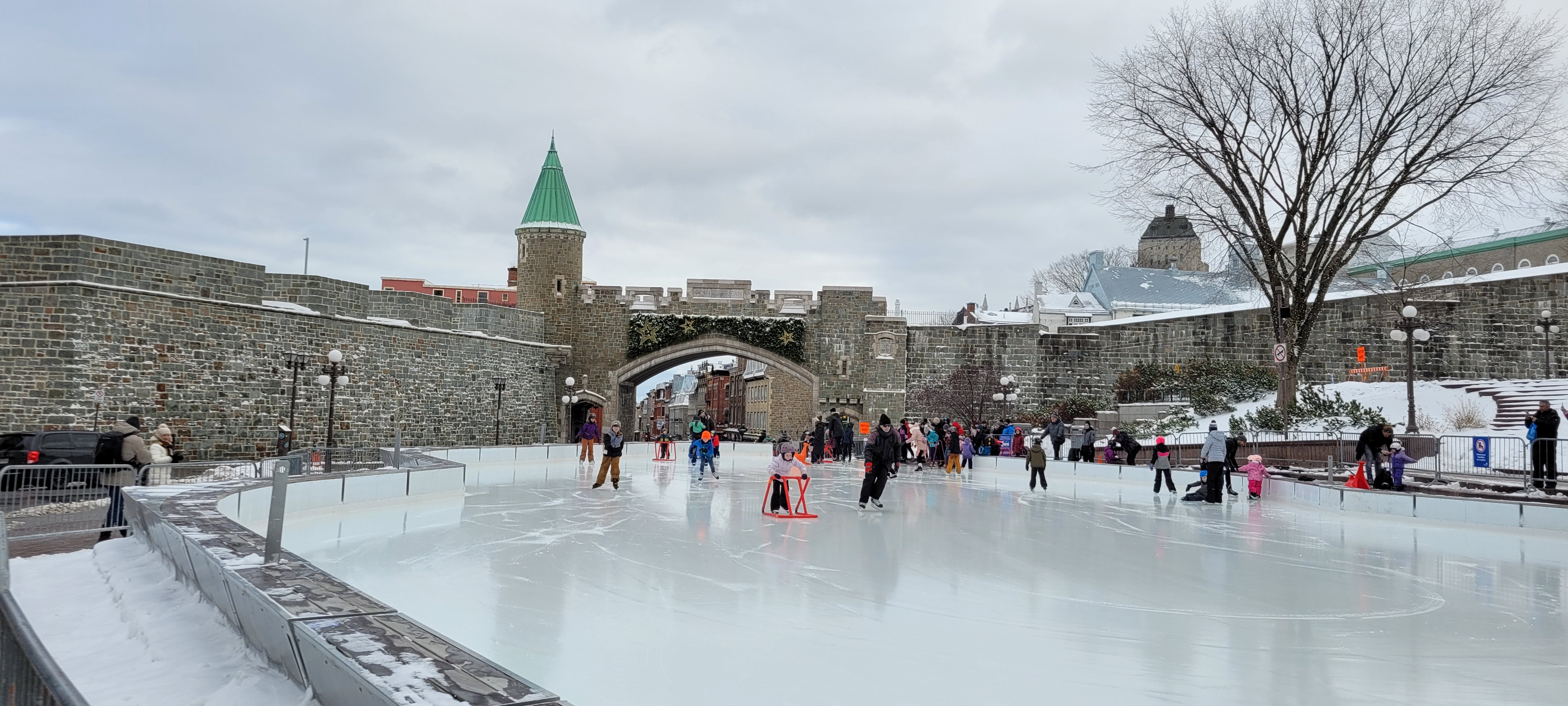
Ice skating in the Place D'Youville Ice rink

Place D’Youville, also referred to as carré D'Youville, is a public square in the core of Quebec City, Quebec, Canada. It is situated on rue Saint-Jean, one of the oldest roads in Quebec City. It marks the boundary between the Quebec Parliament Hill and Old Quebec. The square is named in honour of Marie-Marguerite d'Youville, a French Canadian widow who founded the religious order known as the Grey Nuns of Montreal.

In addition to the square itself, Place D'Youville is also used to refer to the area surrounding the bus terminal for the Réseau de transport de la Capitale (Quebec City's transit system), the Palais Montcalm, and the Théâtre Capitole de Québec.

Part of the square is transformed into a skating rink during winter months, and to its west is the sculpture "The Muses" by Alfred Laliberté, donated by the Government of Quebec for the 375th anniversary of the city in 1983.

== History ==
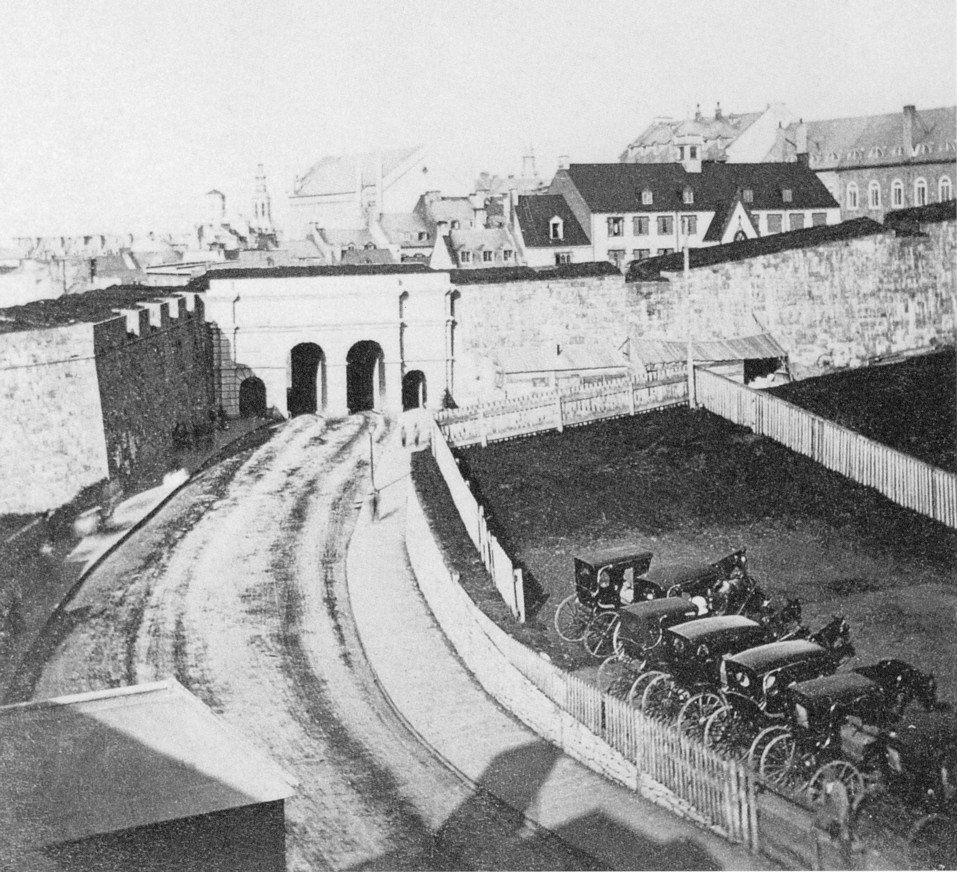
Place d'Youville in 1870

The area where the square is situated has been occupied since the 1730s, and is historically part of the Saint-Jean district. The original buildings were demolished in 1815 to create a glacis in front of the fortifications of Quebec. This was flattened in 1871 and was replaced by the Montcalm market, which was later replaced with a grassy area in 1932 after the market closed, when the Palais Montcalm was built to the south.

=== Redevelopment ===
In 1987, the City of Quebec completed renovations in the region which included several upgrades that were performed to give a modern character to the square. The layout was modified to improve design for pedestrian traffic and entertainment.

UNESCO designated the year 1987 as the International Year of Shelter for the Homeless and media was focused on young runaways who were "squatting" at abandoned buildings. Quebec media turned their attention towards Place D’Youville in 1988 when it reported a "nocturnal fauna" and the presence of youth gangs forming around the fortifications and on rue Saint-Jean. Residents and merchants responded to the redevelopment plan by accusing the municipal government of having created an area conducive to juvenile delinquency. Charitable organizations in the region noted an increase in demand of services from individuals under 24 years of age.

During the early 1990s, it was estimated that between 200 and 300 youth were staying there. The municipal government suggested to open a refuge centre; they were concerned about the numerous runaways that were squatting in the area. Clashes between the merchants and the squatters began in 1991 and had evolved into an open dispute in 1993. The crime rate in the area was increasing and the square had a reputation for drug trafficking.

=== 1996 Riot ===
Multiple riots and demonstrations took place between 1991 and 1996. The most notorious of these took place following the Saint-Jean-Baptiste Day celebrations on June 24, 1996.

Around 2,000 people converged around Place D'Youville at approximately 12:30 a.m. on June 24, 1996, after a concert and the traditional festivities had ended. Shortly after their arrival, multiple fights had started and rocks were being thrown. In response, the Service de police de la Ville de Québec (SPVQ) deployed 240 officers equipped with riot gear. They also used tear gas and a recently acquired water cannon in an attempt to control the crowd.

The riot lasted for four hours, with rioters looting and starting two fires. In the aftermath there was 81 arrests, and around CA$1,000,000 in damages to the National Assembly of Quebec and shops in the area. Both the then-Mayor Jean-Paul L'Allier and the SPVQ chief cited the combination of alcohol use, drugs and the influx of people from outside the region for the events. The SPVQ chief stated that more than a third of those arrested came from outside the Quebec City region.

The public questioned why there was not a greater police presence and why the SPVQ had not requested the aid of the emergency response team from the provincial police service, the Sûreté du Québec. The SPVQ had already been under public scrutiny for their use of cayenne pepper spray against teenagers in a confrontation that had occurred in early May of that same year. Following public outcry, Quebec Minister of Public Security Robert Perreault decided to put the provincial police, the Sûreté du Québec, in charge of security measures in the area surrounding the National Assembly of Quebec, including the square.

=== Red Bull Crashed Ice ===
The square was included in part of the course for the 2014 Red Bull Crashed Ice event which took place March 20–22, 2014. The track had been the longest of the four ice-cross downhill championship events that year, with the others having been held in Helsinki, Finland, St. Paul, Minnesota, and Moscow, Russia.
