= Quebec City tramway =

Tram line under construction in Quebec City, Quebec, Canada

Overview
- Native name: Tramway de Québec
- Status: Under construction
- Locale: Quebec City, Quebec, Canada
- Termini: Le Gendre (Cap-Rouge); Charlesbourg (Phase 1)
- Website: TramCité (in English)

Service
- Type: Tram
- Depot: Rue Mendel (Cap-Rouge)
- Rolling stock: Alstom Citadis Spirit

History
- Planned opening: 2033 (Phase 1)

Technical
- Line length: 19 km (12 mi) (Phase 1)
- Electrification: Overhead line, 750 V DC

The Quebec City tramway (French: Tramway de Québec) is a tram system under construction in Quebec City, officially named TramCité.

Construction was planned to start in 2024, with a completion date of 2029. However, on November 9, 2023, Quebec premier François Legault paused the project, and ordered the Caisse de dépôt et placement du Québec (CDPQ) to take over the project from the city and conduct additional studies.

In June 2024, CDPQ Infra issued its plan for higher-order public transit in Quebec City to be called Circuit Intégré De Transport Express (CITÉ). It proposed 100 kilometres (62 mi) of public transit corridors including 35 kilometres (22 mi) of tram lines and over 35 kilometres (22 mi) of bus rapid transit. The total estimated cost (tram and BRT) would be $14.7 billion. The Quebec provincial government has authorized the implementation of phase 1 of the tramway, which consists of a 19 km (12 mi) line running from Le Gendre to Charlesbourg. Construction started in 2026, and the line is expected to go into service in 2033.

== History ==
- 2000: The Ministère des Transports du Québec gives the RTC the mandate to carry out an opportunity and feasibility study for the insertion of a tramway along the Metrobus routes.
- 2003: The study recommends the construction of a tramway network in the city.
- 2005: The City adds the tramway to its 2005-2025 Master Development Plan.
- 2010: The City committee for sustainable transport submit a report. It recommends to build a tramway line by 2030.
- 2015: Second feasibility study. The City chooses bus rapid transit instead of tramway.
- 2017: Six weeks after municipal elections, the reelected mayor (Régis Labeaume) goes back to a tramway concept.
- 2021: The City launches the procurement process for the construction of the tramway.
- 2023: The provincial government suspends the project and commissions the CDPQ to do further studies.
- 2024: CDPQ Infra publishes a revised proposal for a tramway and bus rapid transit.

=== First attempt (2003) ===
In 2003, the Réseau de transport de la Capitale publishes an opportunity and feasibility study on a light rail system following a government request in 2000. The study shows that a tramway system could be positive for the city. The initially presented project proposes to insert the tram along the existing 800 and 801 Metrobus axes. Those routes pass through high-population-density sectors. With a length of 21.5 km (13.4 mi), the infrastructures would take four years to build. The service frequency would be 5 to 10 minutes.

=== Project presented by the City Committee for sustainable transport (2010) ===
2010 project

On June 10, 2010, the City Committee for sustainable transport recommended to build two tramway lines for $1.5 billion. The first line would be 22.6 km (14.0 mi) long. Starting on the Saint Lawrence south shore, trams would cross the Quebec Bridge, then run along Laurier Boulevard, going through the Laval University campus, down Côte Nérée-Tremblay, along Charest Boulevard to the Quebec Courthouse. From there, they would go north, taking Capucins Boulevard and Chemin de la Canardière to finally end in the future D'Estimauville Ecodistrict. The second line would separate from the first line in Saint-Roch neighbourhood to service Quebec Parliament Hill with a final stop near the Grand Théâtre de Québec. That line, 6.6 km (4.1 mi) long, would link the Grand Théâtre to Charlesbourg. It would pass through Pointe-aux-Lièvres, ExpoCité to Galeries Charlesbourg. A possible extension would be in the Upper town in the direction of Sainte-Foy.

This project was finally abandoned in 2015 in favour of bus rapid transit (SRB). The bus project was in turn cancelled in April 2017 following the withdrawal of the Lévis municipal authorities.

=== Structure-enhancing public transit network (2018) ===
The tramway's eastern terminal was to be Louis-XIV in Charlesbourg in 2018, but was changed to D'Estimauville in 2021, and changed back to Charlesbourg in 2024.

In December 2017, a few weeks after the November municipal elections, reelected Mayor Régis Labeaume said his election promise for a new transport system would after all take the form of a light rail system. The current political context enables a great investment from provincial and federal governments in public transit, unlike the 2010 project.

In March 2018, the City, along with the Government of Quebec, announced the construction of a 23 km (14 mi)-long tramway line for $3 billion. At that time, the line would link Charlesbourg to Cap-Rouge, passing through Quebec Parliament Hill via a 3.5 km (2.2 mi) tunnel. The Quebec City tramway was to be in service in 2026.

=== Reassessment of tramway project (2020–2021) ===
In November 2020, Quebec's environmental review board (BAPE, part of the Ministry of Sustainable Development, Environment, and Fight Against Climate Change) turned down Quebec City's $3.3-billion tramway project proposal. In the report, BAPE stated that planners should have also considered a subway or light rail system, rather than a tramway. The BAPE also states that the existing tramway proposal does not do enough to serve the city's suburbs, which are rapidly growing. Furthermore, BAPE questioned whether a tramway system could cope with the city's winter weather or how it would be integrated into the landscape. Quebec's Transport Minister, François Bonnardel, announced that the government was withdrawing the support for Quebec City's proposed tramway network, which he said will not go ahead unless it is reconfigured to better serve the suburbs.

=== Failed project start (2021–2023) ===
As of March 18, 2021, an agreement was reached to move the tramway project forward. The eastern terminus became D'Estimauville instead of Charlesbourg, and reserved bus lanes would be added on highways to suburban Haute-Saint-Charles. The province promised $1.8 billion in financing for the tramway, the federal government promised $1.2 billion, and Quebec City would contribute $300 million. In June 2021, the opposition party in Quebec City, Quebec 21, proposed a light metro in place of a tramway revival, a proposal rejected by the mayor.

By January 2022, the project costs had increased by $600 million due to a late project start, inflation and increased costs to acquire land. The projected cost was approaching $4 billion.

In April 2022, Quebec City started the selection process for a supplier of light-rail vehicles. In February 2023, Alstom Transport Canada Inc. was the successful bidder. Besides supplying the vehicles, Alstom would have also maintained them for 30 years. The contract called for the construction of 34 Citadis Spirit LRVs with an option for 5 more to handle any increase in ridership. The contract was worth $1.34 billion of which $569 million was for building the vehicles and $768 million was for 30 years of maintenance. Vehicle maintenance was not considered part of the $4 billion capital cost of the line. The Réseau de transport de la Capitale (RTC) agreed to pay about $25 million per year for vehicle maintenance. The vehicles were to be assembled at Alstom's factory in La Pocatière starting as early as November 2023. Alstom would provide operator training for RTC staff.

In April 2023, the city announced that construction would start in 2024 instead of the summer of 2023, thus the projected project completion date had become 2029 instead of 2028.

By November 2023, the estimated cost of the tramway had reached $8.4 billion. Quebec City mayor Bruno Marchand proposed a three-stage implementation of the line. Eastward from Pôle Le Gendre, stage 1 would run to Université Laval, stage 2 to Jean-Paul-L’Allier, and stage 3 to Pôle D'Estimauville. The first stage would open in 2029, and the entire line would be complete by 2031. There was the possibility of multiple consortia being involved in the project.

On November 9, 2023, Quebec premier François Legault suspended the project just before construction was to begin. He ordered the Caisse de dépôt et placement du Québec (CDPQ) to take over the project and conduct additional studies.

=== CITÉ (2024–present) ===
In June 2024, CDPQ Infra issued its plan for higher-order public transit in Quebec City to be called Circuit Intégré De Transport Express (CITÉ). It proposed 100 kilometres (62 mi) of public transit corridors including 35 kilometres (22 mi) of tram lines and over 35 kilometres (22 mi) of bus rapid transit. The total estimated cost (for both the tramway and BRT) would be $14.7 billion.

The system would be implemented in three phases. For the tramway, phase 1 would include a 19-kilometre (12 mi) line from Le Gendre via Sainte-Foy, Université Laval, Colline Parlementaire and Saint-Roch to Charlesbourg. Phase 2 would provide a branch to D’Estimauville. Phase 3 would include a branch line to Lebourgneuf. This would result in a total of 28 kilometres (17 mi) of tramway with an estimated cost of $7 billion (in 2024 dollars). Also, as part of phase 3, there would be a 7-kilometre (4.3 mi) tramway line running from downtown Québec City to downtown Lévis via a tunnel under the St. Lawrence River costing about $4 billion.

The CITÉ plan had some differences from the suspended 2021 plan:

- CITÉ would give priority to build a branch to Charlesbourg over a branch to D'Estimauville.
- CITÉ would prefer trams 35–40 metres long while the city has ordered trams from Alstom with a length of about 47 metres.
- CITÉ would avoid surface stops with parallel side platforms to reduce the width of the right-of-way.
- CITÉ would use trams equipped with batteries so that the overhead wire could be omitted along certain portions of the line.

With the release of the CDPQ Infra report, the Quebec provincial government authorized the implementation of phase 1 of the tramway. In December 2024, the tram line was given the name TramCité. Construction of phase 1 started in 2026 with the line expected to go into service in 2033.

In July 2026, AtkinsRéalis and Siemens Mobility formed a partnership to develop and integrate systems for TramCité such as for signalling, communications and electrification. The partnership will also coordinate the implementation, testing and commissioning of these systems.

== Stations ==
This section does not fully reflect project changes to be made by CDPQ Infra by 2027.

The Quebec City Tramway will be a 19-kilometre (12 mi) light-rail line running between the city districts of Cap-Rouge in the west and Charlesbourg in the east. The line will have 29 stations of which two will be underground in a 2-kilometre (1.2 mi) tunnel. Five of the stations will be designated as transfer hubs (French: pôles d’échanges).

List of stations from west to east
Station	Type	Map	Nearest intersection	City quarter	Connections
Pôle Le Gendre	surface	46°46′23″N 71°21′11″W	Av. Blaise Pascal & Av. Le Gendre,	Cap-Rouge	hub: 7 bus bays
Chaudière	surface	46°46′25″N 71°20′41″W	Rue Mendel & Boul. de la Chaudière,	Cap-Rouge	
McCartney	surface	46°45′58″N 71°19′48″W	Av. McCartney & Boul. Pie-XII	Sainte-Foy	Buses
Pie-XII	surface	46°45′39″N 71°19′13″W	Ch. des Quatre-Bourgeois & Boul. Pie-XII	Sainte-Foy	
Bégon	surface	46°45′49″N 71°18′57″W	Ch. des Quatre-Bourgeois & Av. Bégon	Sainte-Foy	
Duchesneau	surface	46°46′03″N 71°18′36″W	Ch. des Quatre-Bourgeois & Av. Duchesneau	Sainte-Foy	
Roland-Beaudin	surface	46°46′20″N 71°17′57″W	Parc Roland-Beaudin	Sainte-Foy	
Pôle de Sainte-Foy	surface	46°46′01″N 71°17′29″W	Boul. Laurier	Sainte-Foy	hub: 12 bus bays
CHUL	surface	46°46′11″N 71°17′01″W	Boul. Laurier	CHUL (hospital)	
Place Sainte-Foy	surface	46°46′24″N 71°16′35″W	Boul. Laurier	Place Ste-Foy (shopping centre)	
Pôle de l'Université Laval	surface	46°46′38″N 71°16′29″W	Av. de la Medicine	Université Laval	hub: 16 bus bays
Desjardins	surface	46°46′47″N 71°16′12″W	Rue de l'Université	Université Laval	
Myrand	surface	46°47′01″N 71°15′46″W	Boul. René-Lévesque & Av. Myrand	Université Laval	
Maguire	surface	46°47′11″N 71°15′28″W	Boul. René-Lévesque & Av. Maguire	Université Laval	
Holland	surface	46°47′30″N 71°14′56″W	Boul. René-Lévesque & Av. Holland	Sillery/Saint-Sacrement	
Collège Saint-Charles-Garnier	surface	46°47′39″N 71°14′39″W	Boul. René-Lévesque	St. Charles Garnier College	
Belvédère	surface	46°47′50″N 71°14′21″W	Boul. René-Lévesque & Av. Belvédère	Sillery/Saint-Sacrement/Montcalm	
Brown	surface	46°48′00″N 71°14′03″W	Boul. René-Lévesque & Av. Brown	Montcalm	
Cartier	surface	46°48′15″N 71°13′36″W	Boul. René-Lévesque & Av. Cartier	Montcalm	
Colline parlementaire	underground	46°48′32″N 71°13′03″W	Boul. René-Lévesque	Colline Parlementaire	Buses
D'Youville	underground	46°48′42″N 71°12′55″W	near Place d'Youville	Vieux-Québec	Buses
Jean-Paul-L'Allier	surface	46°48′49″N 71°13′27″W	Boulevard Charest E & Rue Couronne	Saint-Roch	Buses
Pôle de Saint-Roch	surface	46°49′08″N 71°13′46″W	Rue de la Croix-Rouge & Autoroute Laurentienne	Saint-Roch	hub: 18 bus bays
9e Rue	surface	46°49′27″N 71°13′56″W	1re Avenue & 9e Rue	Vieux-Limoilou	
Hôpital Saint-François D'Assise	surface	46°49′27″N 71°13′56″W	1re Avenue	Hôpital Saint-François d'Assise; Vieux-Limoilou	
18e Rue	surface	46°50′10″N 71°13′22″W	1re Avenue & 18e Rue	Lairet	Buses
24e Rue	surface	46°50′21″N 71°13′17″W	1re Avenue & 24e Rue	Lairet	
Peupliers	surface	46°50′16″N 71°14′42″W	1re Avenue & Rue des Peupliers	Lairet	
Pôle De Charlesbourg	surface	46°50′31″N 71°14′56″W	1re Avenue & 41e Rue	Saint-Rodrigue	hub: Buses

=== Pôle de Sainte-Foy ===
The Sainte-Foy transfer hub will be located within the quadrilateral bounded by the streets: Avenue Lavigerie, Route de l’Église, Boulevard Laurier and Boulevard Hochelaga. The station will have a large passenger building covering the tramway tracks and platform. The building will have a heated waiting area, washrooms, and ticketing and information facilities. The hub will have two bus terminals, one for RTC buses on the west side of the tracks, and another for STLévis buses on the east side. (Sixty percent of station ridership is expected to come by bus from the city of Lévis.) There will be with 7 bays for buses coming from the west and 5 bays for those coming from the east. The hub will also have a bicycle parking area.

== Tunnel ==
This section does not reflect any changes proposed by CDPQ Infra in June 2024.

There will be a 1.8 km (1.1 mi) long tunnel under the city district Saint-Jean-Baptiste, connecting the upper to lower town. The upper tunnel portal will be opposite the Grand Théâtre de Québec near the intersection of Boulevard René-Lévesque Est and Avenue Turnbull. The lower portal will be in Rue de la Couronne on the west side of Jardin Jean-Paul-L'Allier. The tunnel will be 15 metres (49 ft) to 40 metres (130 ft) below the surface. A tunnel would avoid the steep grades that would result from a line built on the surface. The floor slabs at the tunnel portals will have heaters to melt snow in winter.

The tunnel will have two underground stations: Colline parlementaire and D'Youville. These two stations will have a few common characteristics. Both are designed by the architect Anouk Boucher-Pilon and will feature wood, ample window lighting and mural art. Both stations will have stairs, escalators and at least one elevator. Each station will have only one entrance. Station ventilation will be via the tunnel portals; normally there will be no other ventilation within the stations. In case of fire, people could evacuate via the tunnel portals; there will be ventilators to clear smoke.

The entrance to the station Colline Parlementaire will be located in front of the Marie-Guyart Building between Boulevard René-Lévesque and Promenade des Premiers-Ministres. The entrance building will have exterior walls clad in limestone and a green roof.

The entrance to the station D'Youville will be located at the intersection of Rue Saint-Joachim and Avenue Honoré-Mercierin, and will be accessible from Rue Saint-Jean and Avenue Honoré-Mercierin. The entrance building will be clad in brick and have a partially green roof. The exit at Rue Saint-Jean will be in an existing building.

== Operations ==
This section does not reflect any changes proposed by CDPQ Infra in June 2024.

Frequency of service along the line Would be every 4 to 8 minutes in peak periods. Tramway service Alstom Citadis Spirit operate from 5AM to 1AM. The line Alstom Citadis Spirit have a maximum capacity of 4,080 passengers per hour. Trams Alstom Citadis Spirit operate in reserved lanes and have priority at traffic lights.

A trip between Université Laval and D’Estimauville is estimated to take 43 minutes by Métrobus with a variation of -2 to +10 minutes. The same trip by tramway would take 25 minutes with a maximum variation of +2 minutes.

The maximum tram speed would vary depending on the location of the right-of-way. Off street, such as between Chaudière and McCartney stations or in the tunnel, the maximum speed would be 70 kilometres per hour (43 mph). But where the street space is closely shared with pedestrians such as between Jean-Paul-L'Allier and Pôle de Saint-Roch, the maximum speed would be 30 kilometres per hour (19 mph). On a boulevard, the maximum speed would be 50 kilometres per hour (31 mph) such as between CHUL and Place Sainte-Foy stations. On narrower arteries, the maximum speed would be 40 kilometres per hour (25 mph).

The line would use 34 Alstom Citadis Spirit vehicles. Each vehicle would consist of 4 modules, be 47 metres (154 ft) long and have 7 doors on each side with a capacity of 272 passengers, 4 times the capacity of a regular bus. The trams were expected to accommodate 3.3 passengers per square metre.

The Operation and Maintenance Centre (French: Centre d'exploitation et d'entretien – CEE) would be located along Rue Mendel between the stations Pôle Le Gendre and Chaudière. The site occupies an area of 3.62 hectares (8.9 acres). A U-shaped building would provide indoor vehicle storage as well as maintenance functions such as motor repairs, paint shop, vehicle wash and the repair of doors, windows, air conditioning or light fixtures. The facility would also contain a control centre to monitor operation of the line.

== See also ==
- Réseau de transport de la Capitale
