= Réseau de transport de la Capitale =

Public transportation organization in Quebec

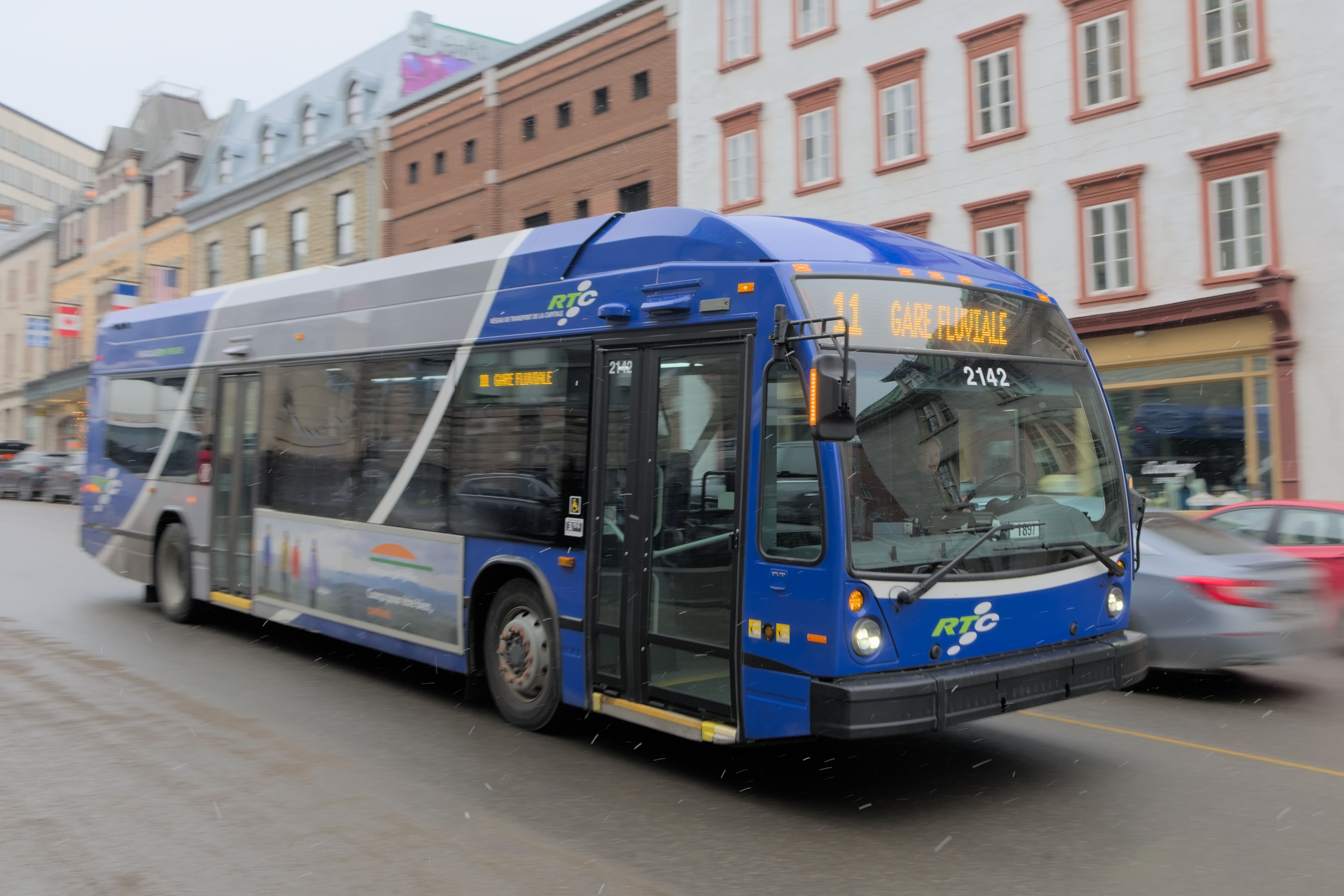
- Nova Bus LFS HEV operating regular service

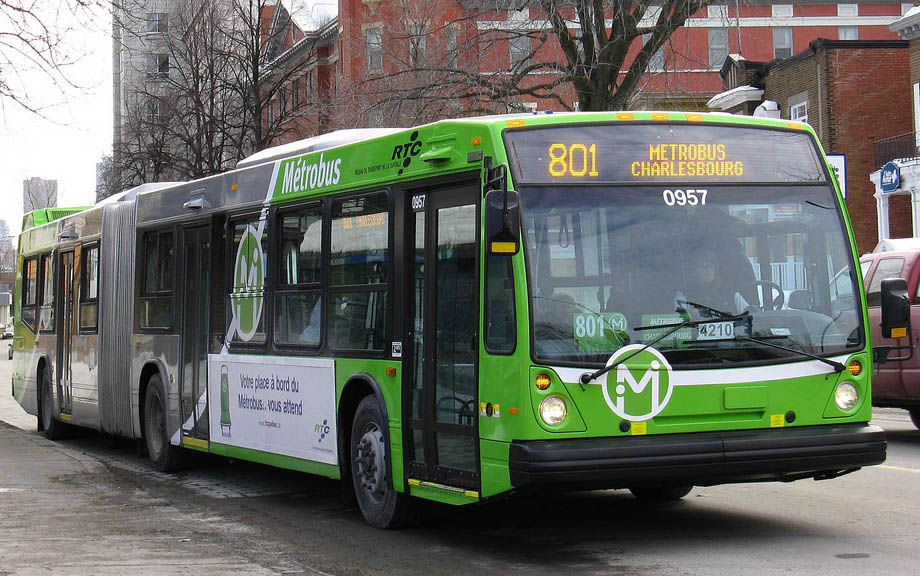
- Nova Bus LFS Artic operating Métrobus service

Overview
- Transit type: Bus service Bus rapid transit Paratransit
- Number of lines: 160
- Number of stations: 4383 stops
- Daily ridership: 70,000
- Annual ridership: 26,584,232 (2023)
- Headquarters: 720, rue des Rocailles; Quebec City, Quebec; G2J 1A5
- Website: English language site

Operation
- Began operation: 2002
- Number of vehicles: 630 buses, 114 articulated buses, 64 midibuses

The Réseau de transport de la Capitale (French pronunciation: [ʁezo də tʁɑ̃spɔʁ də la kapital], RTC), the brand name for the Société de transport de Québec, provides urban public transit services in the Quebec City area. It was founded in 2002, continuing the operations of the former Société de transport de la Communauté urbaine de Québec, as the latter was merged into the new Quebec City.

== History ==
=== Early public transit in Quebec City ===
Before the bus, public transit was provided in the form of a tramway operated by the Quebec Railway, Light & Power Company. It was initially horse-drawn in 1863, and made electric in 1897. This network connected the upper and lower towns. It was extended in 1910 to Sillery via Boulevard Saint-Cyrille (later renamed Boulevard René-Lévesque) and Rue Sheppard, to Avenue Maguire. A new line was established in 1912 connecting the historic district of Beauport to the Kent House. The tramway began to be converted to buses in 1937, and this conversion was complete by 1948 with the closure of the line in Saint-Sauveur.

=== Modern period ===
The modern public transit system was born on November 23rd 1969 with the Loi de la Communauté urbaine de Québec. It took the name Commission de transport de la Communauté urbaine de Québec (CTCUQ). The CTCUQ improved transit in Quebec City in numerous ways: dedicated bus lanes on certain arterial roads in 1975, express routes in 1977, and the establishment of the Parc-O-Bus in 1980. In this period, it also acquired multiple private bus companies and standardized fares.

The organization underwent a major reorganization in 1992, and a recovery plan was implemented. Most notably, this plan put in place the Métrobus and Couche-tard services, more dedicated bus lanes, and network changes. The CTCUQ became the Société de transport de la Communauté urbaine de Québec (STCUQ) in 1994. Following the municipal reorganizations of Quebec in 2002, it briefly became the Societé de transport de Québec, and finally, the Réseau de transport de la Capitale (RTC). The ridership of this network grew substantially in this period, reaching a ridership of 41.3 million in 2007. A system of electric minibuses known as Écolobus was added to the system in 2008, but later phased out in 2015. Additionally, the Opus card was implemented for fare payment on buses.

The RTC acquired 101 hybrid buses from 2012 to 2015. It has also implemented an intelligent transportation system implementing GPS tracking. A bus network computerization project known as RTC Nomade was implemented over 10 years that allows passengers to view live locations of buses online, on bus information screens, through bus audio announcements, and at stations.

==== 2025 strike action ====
In 2025, the RTC was hit by multiple strikes as a result of the maintenance workers' contract expiring, resulting in over a week without service. A two-day strike happened on 22 and 23 May, followed by one during the Festival d'été de Québec in July. A third strike was planned to last during the weekend of 5 to 7 September,. but an agreement was reached on 5 September, so the strike was shortened, and service resumed on 6 September.

== Operations ==
Bus
This is the regular bus service, including routes 1 to 185. It serves the commercial and residential sectors of the city. Those under 100 are generally in service every day, except routes 9, 22, 29, 33, 56, 65, 88 and 90, which are not in service on the weekends. Routes in the 100s have limited stops and operate at peak periods on weekdays.
Métrobus
This service includes the 800s. They are high frequency routes served by articulated buses, and they operate on major arteries, generally with dedicated bus lanes. Métrobus routes operate seven days a week, including holidays.
Express
This service includes routes 230 to 584, which connect different residential sectors to various termini. They connect to La Cité-Limoilou (200s) and to Sainte-Foy–Sillery–Cap-Rouge (300s to governmental and educational campuses and 500s to Laurier and De l'Église. These generally operate at peak periods on weekdays, with certain routes also operating at other times.
Couche-tard
This service includes the 900s. These routes circulate at night and the evenings of Fridays and Saturdays.

=== Métrobus ===
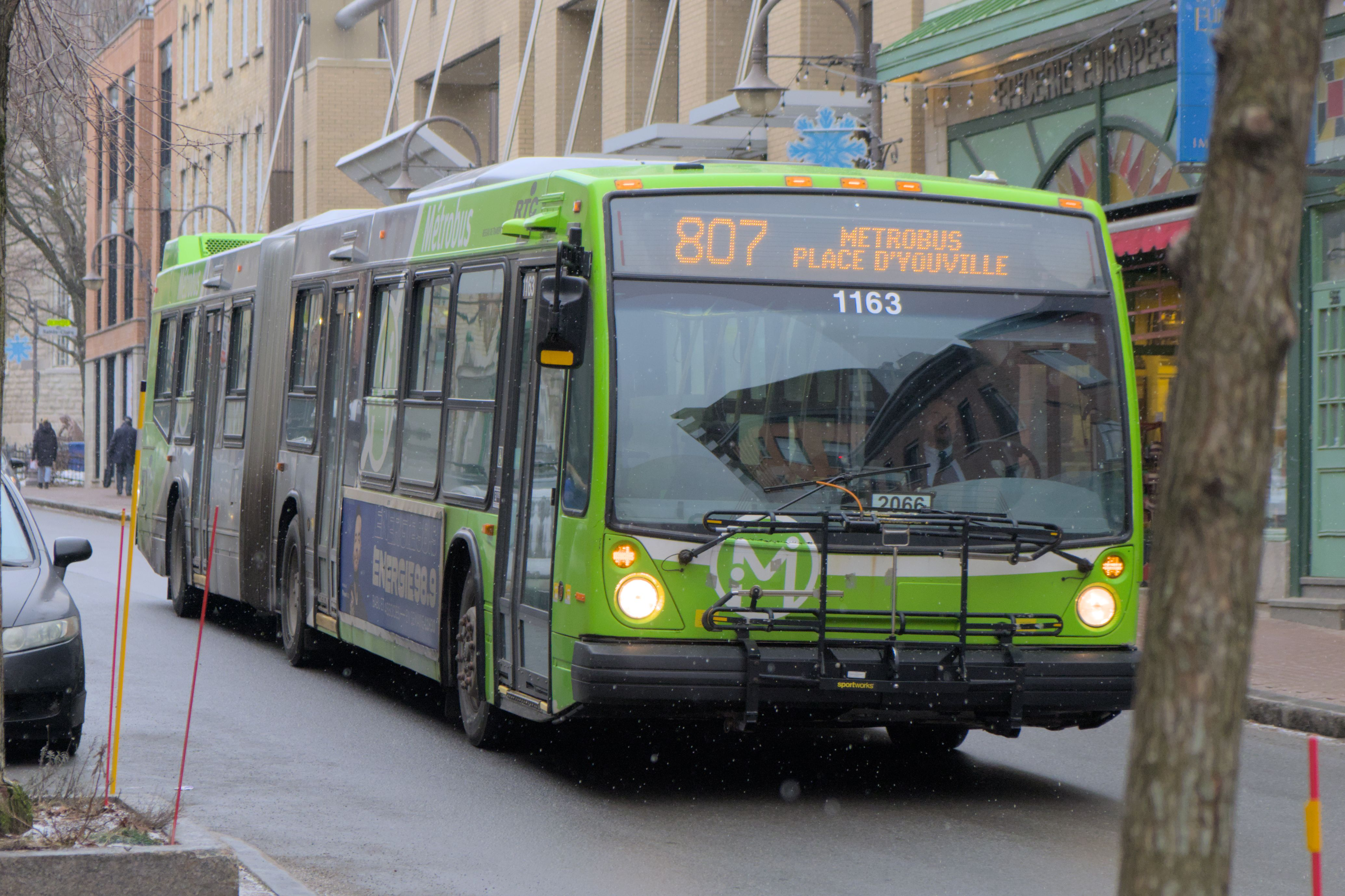
LFS Artic operating Métrobus route 807

The RTC operates six high-frequency lines under the Métrobus brand: lines 800 through 804, and 807. Lines 800 and 801 run together from De Marly to Dorchester/de la Couronne. Line 801 continues on to Terminus du Zoo, while line 800 diverges to the Montmorency falls. Line 802, runs from Terminus Beauport to Station Belvédère. Then, line 803 runs from Terminus les Saules to Terminus Beauport, through Le Mesnil, Lebourgneuf and Charlesbourg. Line 804, links Sainte-Foy with Val-Bélair going through the Terminus les Saules and the Université Laval campus and then finally the 807 goes between De Marly and Place D'Youville by riding along the Chemin Sainte-Foy until it merges to Rue Saint-Jean. Service is every 5 minutes during peak times, every 10 minutes before and after then, and every 15 minutes during less-travelled times.

=== Other services ===
- Parc-O-Bus: select parking lots to encourage use of public transit
- STAC: Service de transport adapté de la Capitale: paratransit for the physically challenged
- Taxibus:an on-call taxi service connecting passengers in remote areas to the nearest bus stop
- Flexibus: an on-demand transit service in certain areas poorly served by conventional transit
- àVélo is an electric-assist bike-sharing service operated by Capitale Mobilité, a subsidiary of the RTC, that allows users to make short, practical trips within the city.

=== Future projects ===
A study concluded in March 2003, stated the introduction of light rail transit services would be feasible for the entire area. In March 2018, a $3 billion proposal for a combination of tramways (the Quebec City tramway), an electric trambus and reserved bus lanes was announced.

In November 2019, the Réseau de transport de la Capitale announced that it is planning to open the city's first BRT line along Boulevard Charest by 2026, utilizing a fleet of bi-articulated electric buses.

== Fleet ==
Active

- Nova LFS HEV (2010, 2015-2024)
- Nova LFS Artic (2010-2012)
- Nova LFS Artic HEV (2016, 2022-2024)
- Nova LFS (2007-2013)
- Van Hool A330K (2018-2019)

The active fleet is wheelchair accessible.

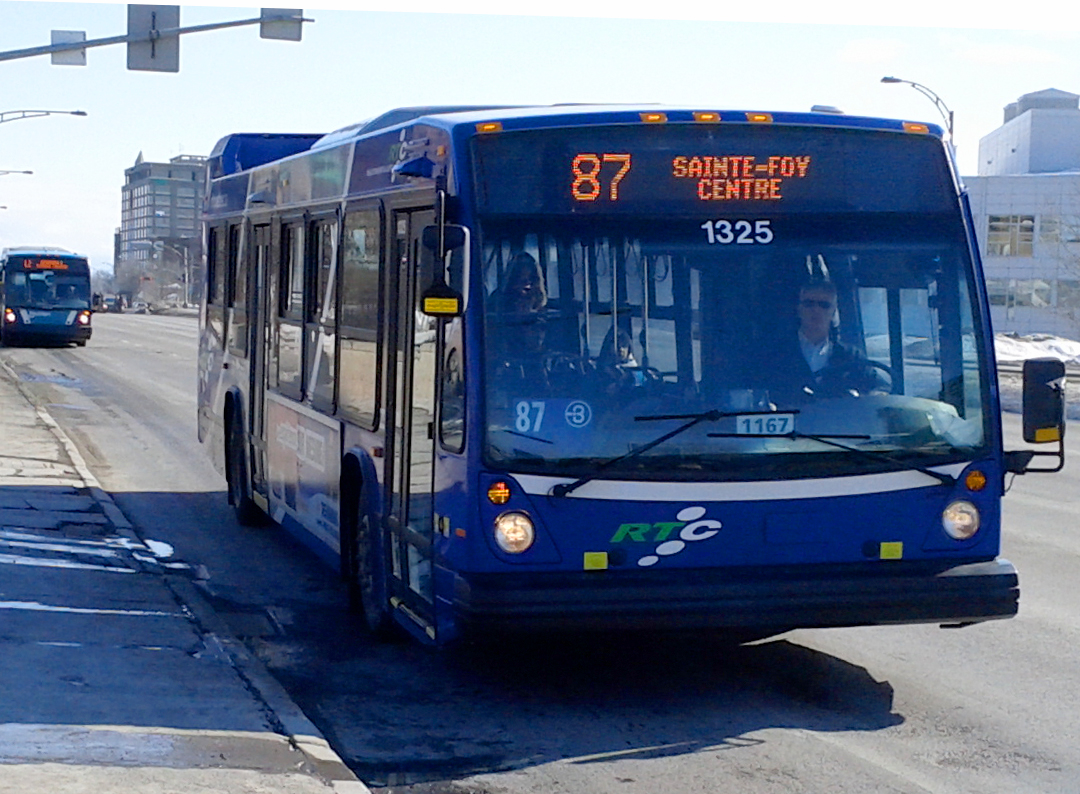
2013 Nova Bus LFS

2019 Van Hool A330K

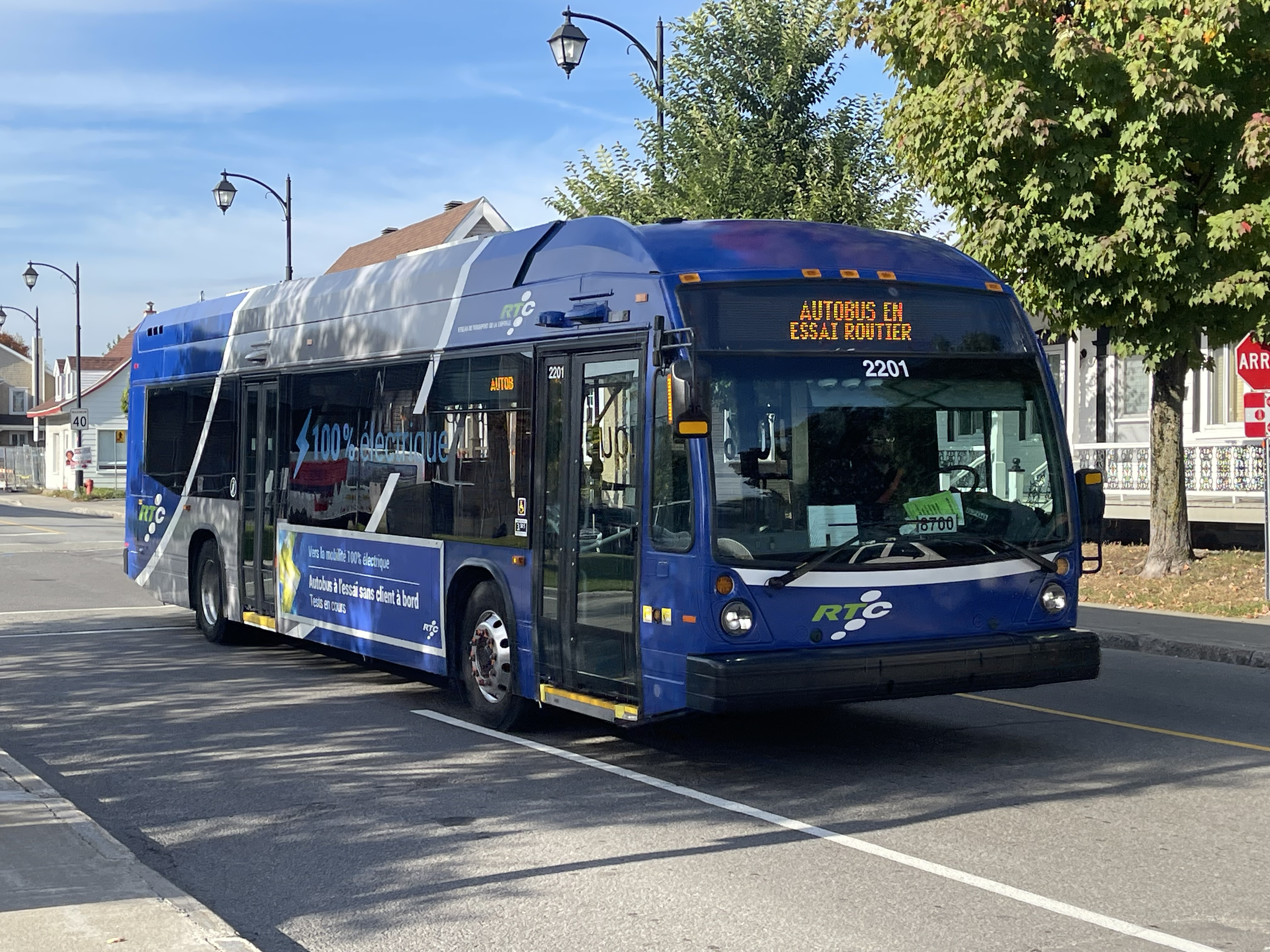
2022 Nova Bus LFSe+

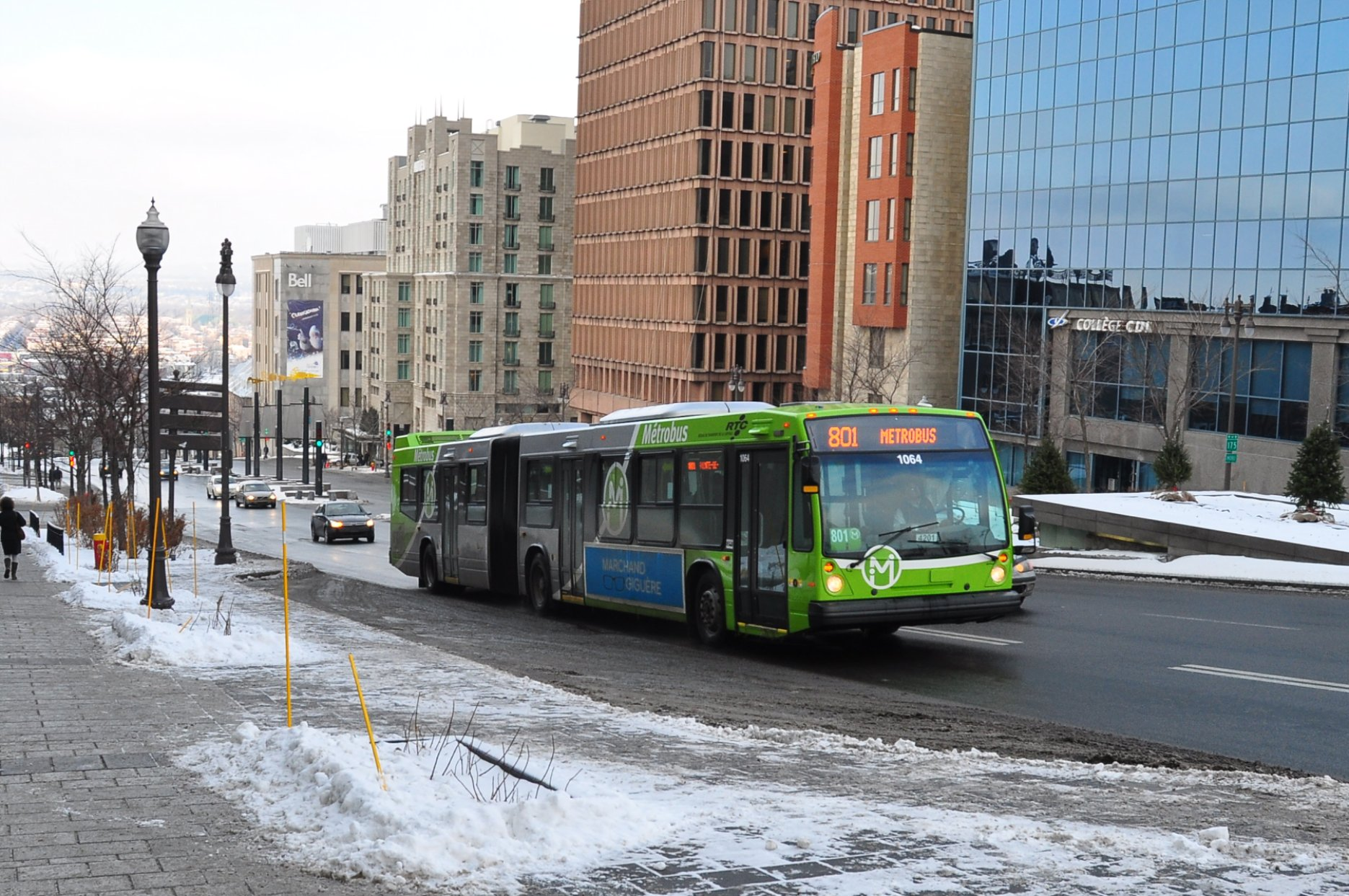
2010 Nova Bus LFS Artic

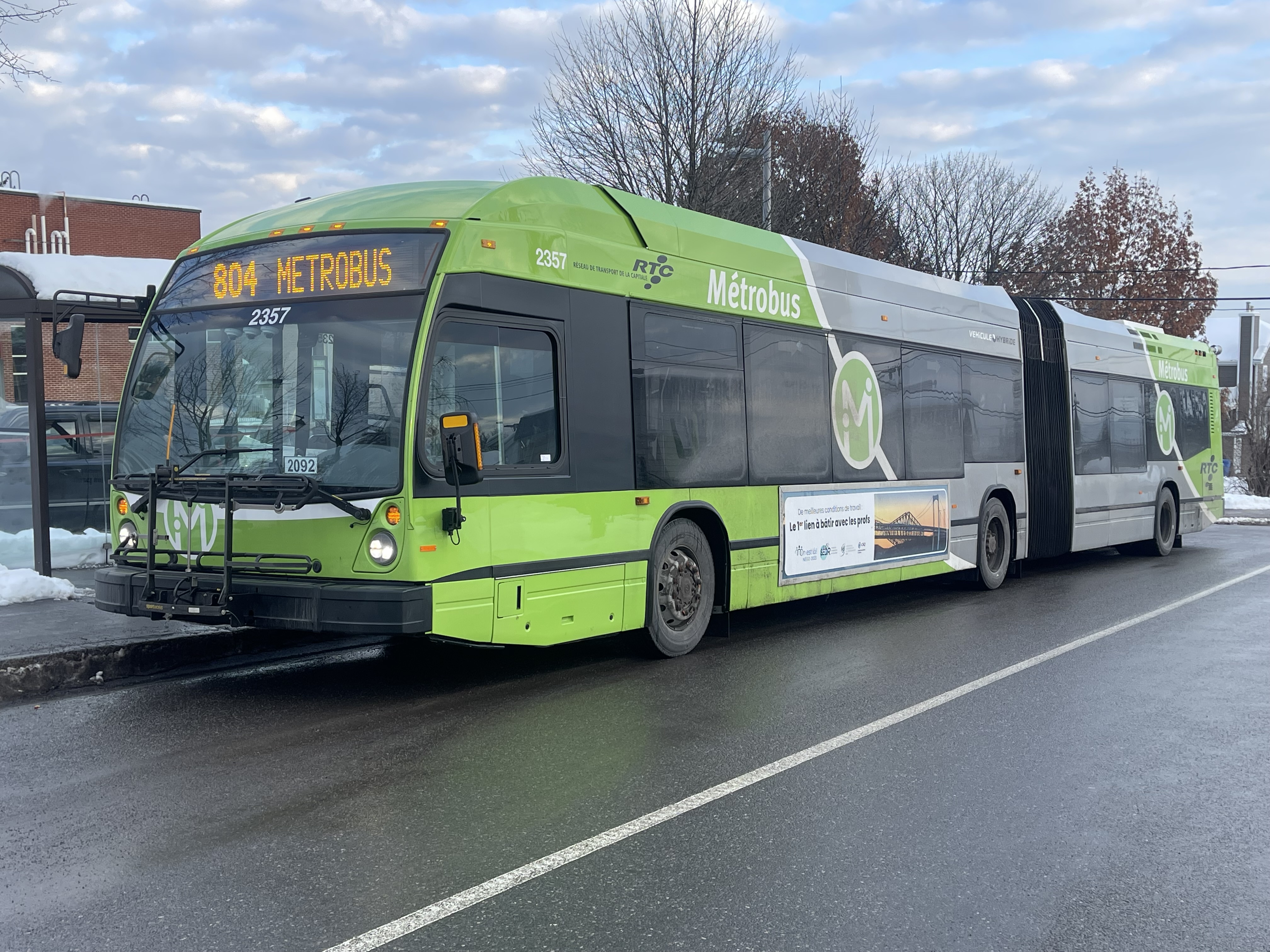
2023 Nova Bus LFS Artic HEV

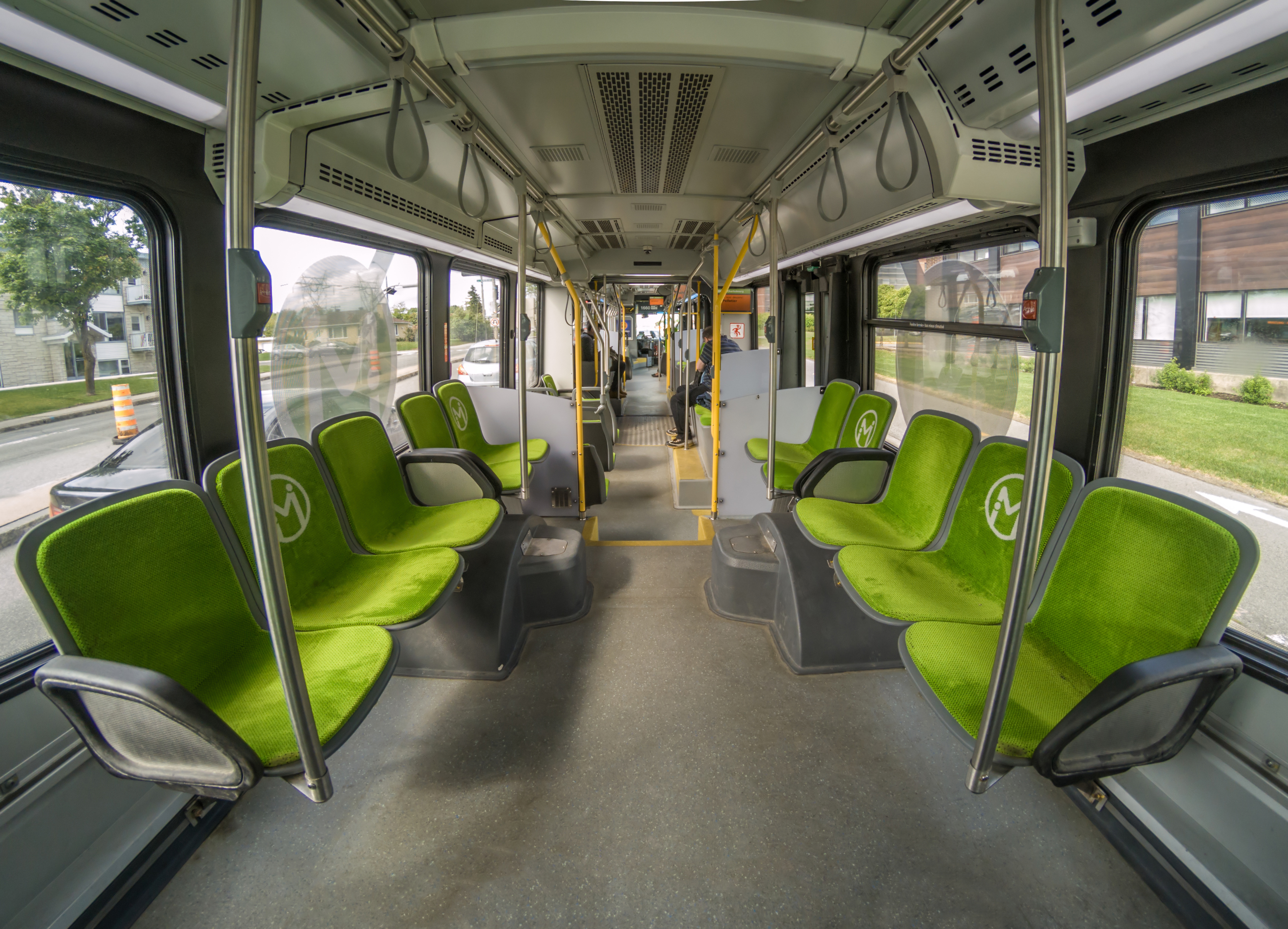
Inside of an articulated LFS HEV (Métrobus service)

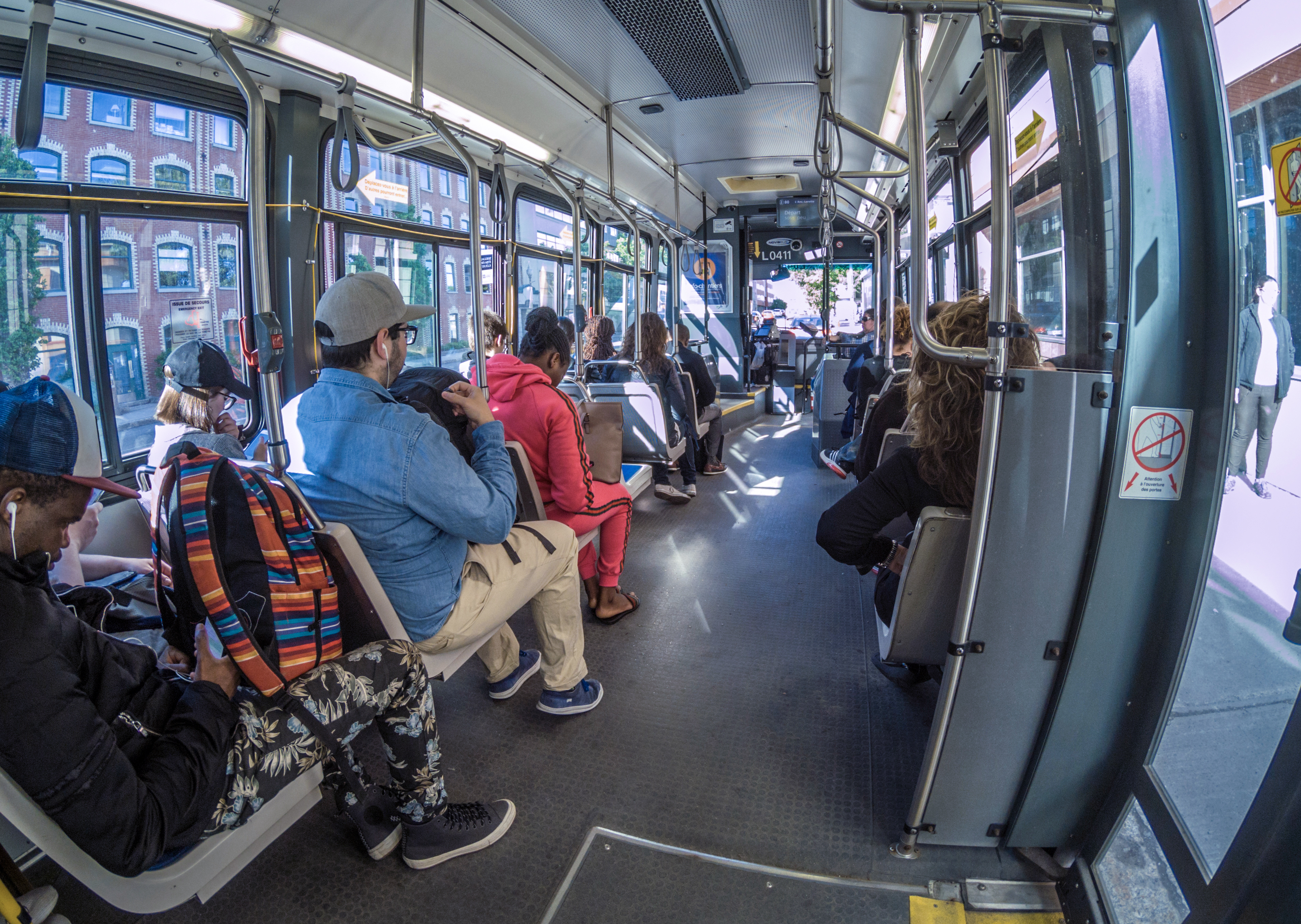
Inside of a regular LFS (regular service)

Retired

- GM New Look (1959-1985) (T6H-5307)
- MCI Classic Gray Line (1983-1986-1988-1989)
- MCI Classic Articulated (1992) (TC60-102N)
- MCI Classic (1990-1992) (TC40-102N)
- GM Classic (1983-1986) (TC40-102N)
- Nova LFS (1996, 1998, 1999-2006)
- Nova LFS Artic (2009)
- Nova LFSe+ (2022)
- Nova Bus Classic (1994-1996) (TC40-102N)
- Tecnobus Gulliver (2008)
- Orion II (1994)
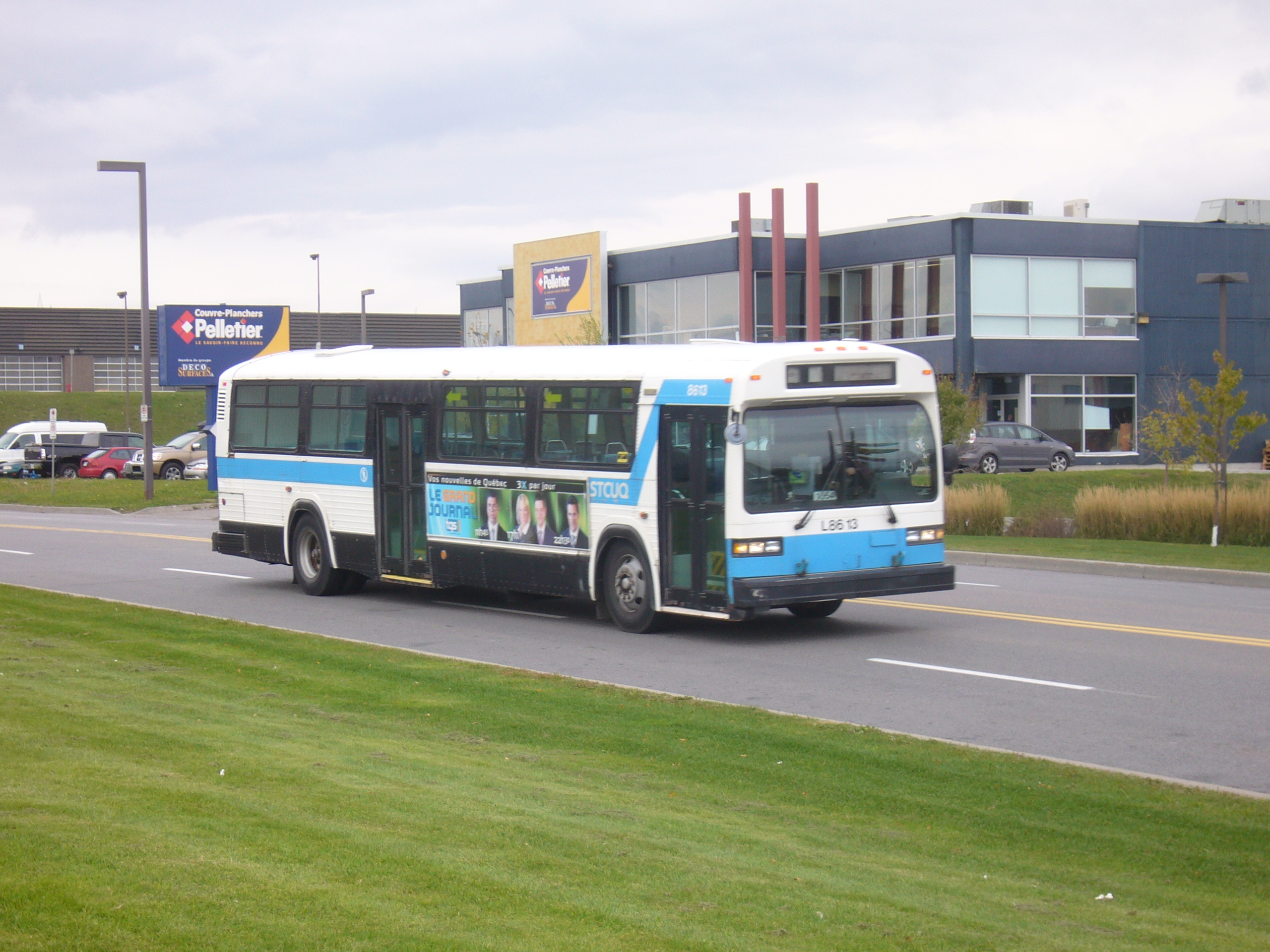
1986 GM Classic

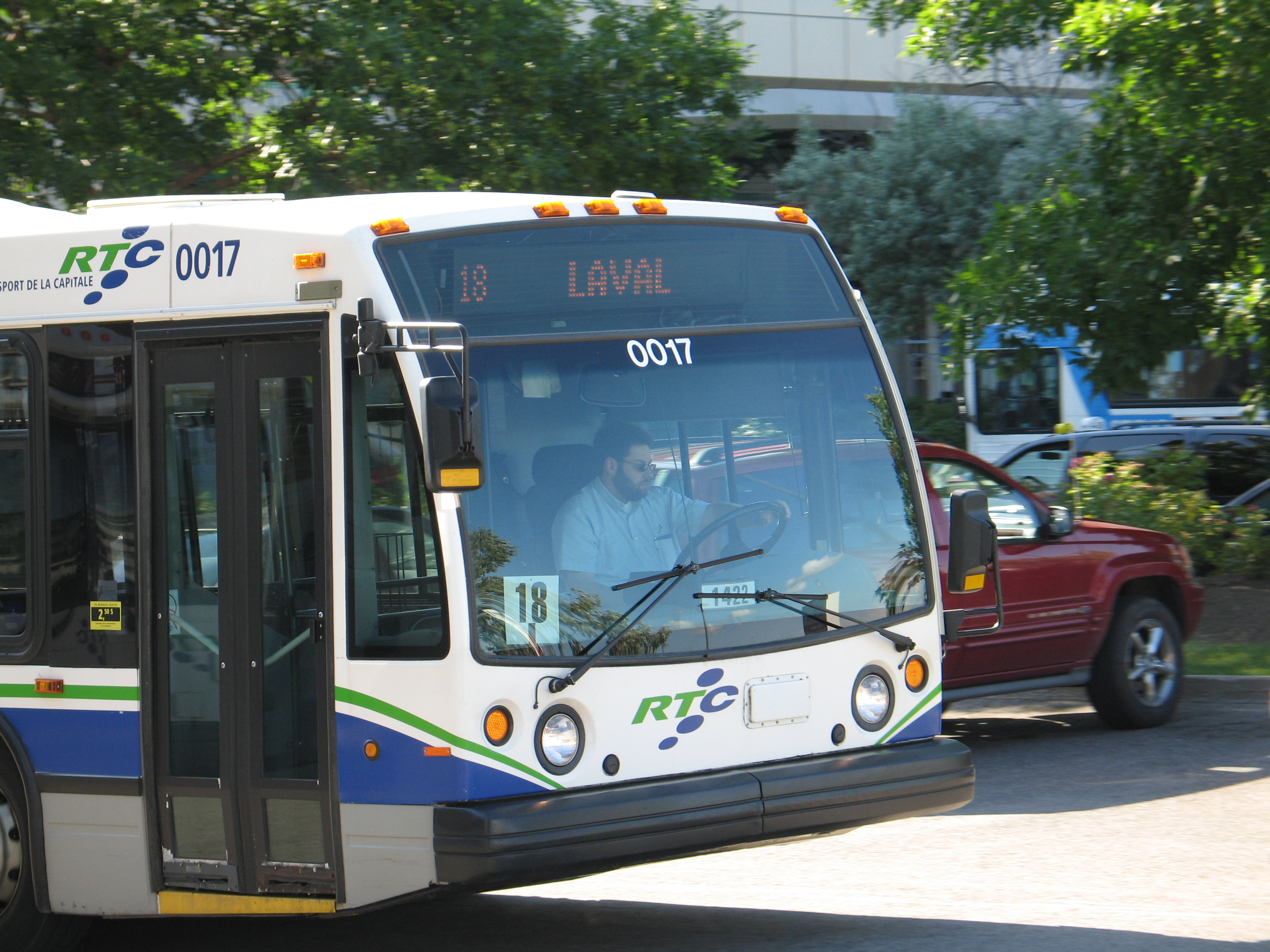
2000 Nova Bus LFS

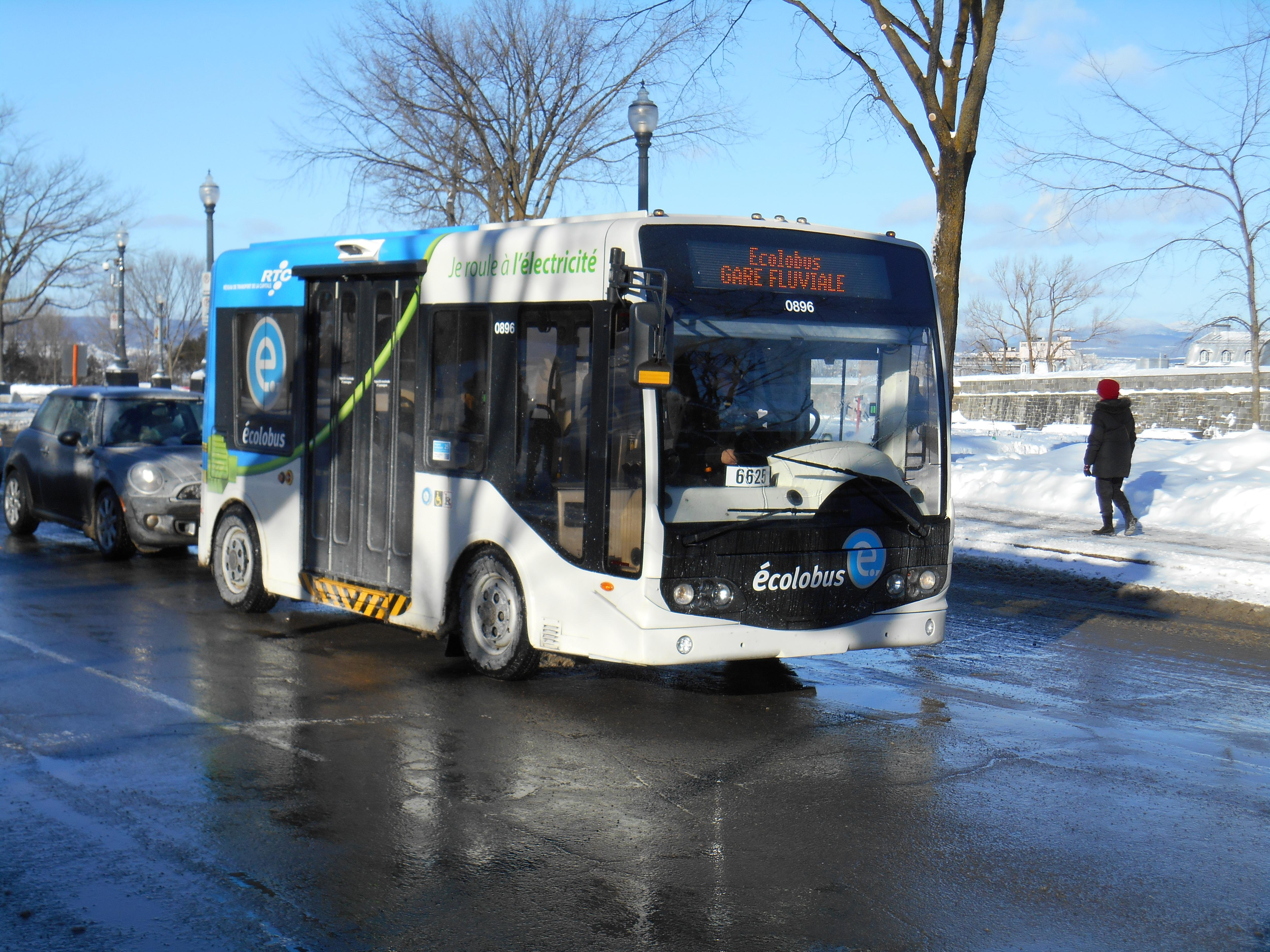
2008 Technobus Gulliver
