= MTA Regional Bus Operations bus fleet =

Listing of MTA's current bus fleet

The MTA Regional Bus Operations bus fleet is a fleet of buses in fixed-route service in New York City under the "MTA New York City Bus" (also known as New York City Transit or NYCT) and "MTA Bus" (also known as the MTA Bus Company) brands, both of which operate local, limited, rush, express, and Select Bus Service routes.

== Description and history ==
The fleet consists of over 5,800 buses of various types and models for fixed-route service, making MTA RBO's fleet the largest public bus fleet in the United States. The MTA also has over 2,000 vans and cabs for ADA paratransit service, providing service in New York City, southwestern Nassau County, and the city of Yonkers. All vehicles, with the exception of paratransit cabs, are fully accessible to persons with disabilities. Fixed-route buses are dispatched from 27 garages (19 New York City Bus and 8 MTA Bus) and one annex in New York City.

Several fleet improvements have been introduced over the system's history. The first large order of air conditioned buses began service in 1966. "Kneeling buses" were introduced in 1976, and wheelchair lifts began appearing in 1980. Also in the 1980s, stop-request cords (or "bell cords") were replaced by yellow tape strips. However, buses ordered after 2008 feature cords rather than tape strips due to the latter's higher maintenance cost. Articulated buses were introduced in 1996, and have since become prominent in the Bronx and Manhattan. Low-floor buses, designed to speed boarding and alighting and improve riding conditions for elderly and disabled passengers, were first tested in 1997 and have made up most of the new non-express buses ordered since the early 2000s. The last non-express high-floor bus was withdrawn in 2019.

Most post-2000 orders also feature stop-request buttons located on grab bars. Beginning in 2016, new orders have been built/retrofitted with Wi-Fi connectivity and USB charging ports. In 2023, Wi-Fi connectivity was removed on all buses due to low usage. In 2023, the MTA began adding open-stroller areas to some buses, reducing the need for passengers with babies to fold their strollers; this was expanded to all buses in 2026. Non-folding bicycles are banned on most bus routes, except for a small number of routes that cross major bridges—the Bx23, M60 SBS, Q44 SBS, Q50, S53, S79 SBS and S93—whose fleet have bicycle racks on their exteriors. Some bus routes serving LaGuardia Airport and John F. Kennedy International Airport also have luggage racks inside.

Starting in 2016, efforts to bring an audio/visual system to the current and future fleet went underway to improve customer service and ADA accessibility thru use of next stop announcements & PSAs. Though the former Long Island Bus Division (now NICE Bus) had already deployed such a system throughout its fleet since the early-2000s, the MTA had only trialed similar systems alongside GPS tracking between 2007 and 2012 on select routes in the New York City Bus system. Current plans include the installation of digital information screens installed throughout the interior of the bus which will provide real-time information such as time, weather, advertisements, & service advisories. The screens are supplied by contract from 3 different vendors and are installed on new bus deliveries starting in 2017 while buses built after 2008 are currently receiving retrofits. A new livery was also introduced, replacing the blue stripe livery on a white base that had been in use in one variation or another since the late 1970s. The first of these buses entered service in mid-May 2016 on the Q10 route.

=== Low and zero emission buses ===
Buses operating on clean or alternative fuels also make up a significant portion of the fleet, particularly since the establishment of the MTA's "Clean Fuel Bus" program in June 2000. Buses running compressed natural gas (CNG) were first tested in the early 1990s, and were mass-ordered beginning in 1995. Hybrid-electric buses, operating with a combination of diesel and electric power, were introduced in September 1998 with the Orion VI, and mass-ordered beginning in 2003 with the Orion VII. These hybrid buses proved to be useful, at least the 2006-2007 models, for these models cost significantly less to repair and maintain than earlier units. As of December 2022, the fleet has over 1,100 diesel-electric buses and over 700 buses powered by compressed natural gas, which make up less than half of the total fleet. This is the largest fleet of either kind in the United States.

In 2017, the MTA tested a fleet of ten forty-foot battery electric buses – five from New Flyer and five from Proterra, the XE40 Xcelsior CHARGE and Catalyst BE40 models respectively. These were all leases, which expired in 2021. In 2019, the MTA ordered their first battery-electric sixty-foot articulated buses, with an order of fifteen XE60 Xcelsior CHARGE buses from New Flyer, deployed on Manhattan Select Bus Service routes. In April 2021, the agency placed an RFP for forty-five new forty-foot battery-electric buses. Later in 2021, the MTA awarded New Flyer the contract for the electric bus order, set to arrive in late 2022 and 2023. 15 more buses were added to the originally 45 bus contract, making for a total of 60 buses allotted for MTA NYCT.

In 2022, the MTA announced that they would trial hydrogen fuel cell buses, funded by a grant from New York State Energy Research and Development Authority. The first two buses (New Flyer Xcelsior CHARGE H2) will be launched in The Bronx by late 2025.

The MTA announced that it would only purchase zero-emission buses from 2029, and that the entire bus fleet will be zero-emission by 2040.

== Fixed-route fleet details ==
A roster of the fleet is shown below. Not included below are buses and vans not open to the general public (Access-A-Ride vans, taxicabs, and employee shuttle buses), retired buses, or demonstration buses. This list also does not include buses formerly operated by MTA Long Island Bus (now Nassau Inter-County Express) that later operated under contract to Nassau County by Veolia Transport/Transdev.

=== Local, Limited, Rush, and Select Bus Service vehicles ===
All buses listed below have semi-low floors.

Image	Type	Model year	Length	Numbers (total)	Approximate amount active	Energy source	Operator
	Orion Bus Industries; Orion VII 07.501 HEV; Next Generation	2009-2010	40 ft (12 m)	4343-4702 (360 buses)	86 retiring	Diesel-electric hybrid	NYCT
BX6 1204	Nova Bus; LFSA TL62102A; 1st Generation; Articulated	2010	62 ft (19 m)	1202-1289 (88 buses)	53 retiring	Diesel	NYCT
	Nova Bus; LFS TL40102A; 3rd Generation	2011	40 ft (12 m)	8000-8089 (90 buses)	88	Diesel	NYCT
	Orion Bus Industries; Orion VII 07.501; EPA10; 3rd Generation	2011	40 ft (12 m)	7000-7089 (90 buses)	88	Diesel	NYCT
	New Flyer; XD40 Xcelsior	2011	40 ft (12 m)	4810-4899 (90 buses)	88	Diesel	NYCT
	New Flyer; C40LF Low Floor	2011-2013	40 ft (12 m)	185-672 (488 buses)	486	CNG	MTA Bus & NYCT
Bx19 5956	Nova Bus; LFSA TL62102A; 1st Generation; Articulated	2011-2013	62 ft (19 m)	5252-5298; 5300-5363; 5770-5986 (328 buses)	326	Diesel	NYCT
	New Flyer; XD60 Xcelsior; Articulated	2012-2013	60 ft (18 m)	4710-4799 (90 buses)	89	Diesel	NYCT
	New Flyer; XD40 Xcelsior	2014-2015	40 ft (12 m)	7090-7483 (394 buses)	389	Diesel	MTA Bus & NYCT
	Nova Bus; LFS TL40102A; 4th Generation	2015-2016	40 ft (12 m)	8090-8503 (414 buses)	409	Diesel	NYCT
	New Flyer; XD60 Xcelsior; Articulated	2016	60 ft (18 m)	5364-5438 (75 buses)	72	Diesel	MTA Bus
	New Flyer; XN40 Xcelsior	2017	40 ft (12 m)	673-810 (138 buses)	135	CNG	NYCT
	New Flyer; XD60 Xcelsior; Articulated	2017	60 ft (18 m)	5987-6125 (139 buses)	137	Diesel	MTA Bus & NYCT
An SBS bus on the M14D	Nova Bus; LFSA TL62102A; 2nd Generation; Articulated	2017-2018	62 ft (19 m)	5439-5602 (164 buses)	162	Diesel	NYCT
1102 on the B35	New Flyer; XN60 Xcelsior; Articulated	2017-2018	60 ft (18 m)	1000-1109 (110 buses)	108	CNG	NYCT
9501 B54	New Flyer; XDE40 Xcelsior	2018	40 ft (12 m)	9500-9509 (10 buses)	10	Diesel-electric hybrid	NYCT
	New Flyer; XD40 Xcelsior	2018-2019	40 ft (12 m)	7484-7850 (367 buses)	363	Diesel	NYCT
	Nova Bus; LFS TL40102A; 4th Generation	2019	40 ft (12 m)	8504-8754 (251 buses)	247	Diesel	NYCT
	New Flyer; XE60 Xcelsior CHARGE; Articulated	2019	60 ft (18 m)	4950-4964 (15 buses)	15	Battery electric	NYCT
	New Flyer; XD60 Xcelsior; Articulated	2019-2020	60 ft (18 m)	6126-6286 (161 buses)	161	Diesel	MTA Bus & NYCT
	Nova Bus; LFS HEV TL40102A; 3rd Generation	2021-2022	40 ft (12 m)	9620-9912 (293 buses)	293	Diesel-electric hybrid	NYCT
	Nova Bus; LFS TL40102A; 4th Generation	2021-2022	40 ft (12 m)	8755-8963 (209 buses)	208	Diesel	NYCT
	New Flyer; XDE40 Xcelsior	2021-2022	40 ft (12 m)	9416-9499; 9510-9619 (194 buses)	193	Diesel-electric hybrid	NYCT
	New Flyer; XD40 Xcelsior	2021-2022	40 ft (12 m)	7851-7989 (139 buses)	138	Diesel	NYCT
	Nova Bus; LFS TL40102A; 4th Generation	2023-2024	40 ft (12 m)	8964-9271 (308 buses)	308	Diesel	MTA Bus
	New Flyer; XD40 Xcelsior	2023-2024	40 ft (12 m)	9272-9387 (116 buses)	116	Diesel	MTA Bus
	New Flyer; XE40 Xcelsior CHARGE	2024	40 ft (12 m)	4965-5024 (60 buses)	60	Battery electric	NYCT
	Nova Bus; LFSe+	2025-2026	40 ft (12 m)	5025-5029 (5 buses)	5	Battery electric	NYCT
	New Flyer; XHE40 Xcelsior CHARGE H2	2025-2026	40 ft (12 m)	5217 5218 (2 buses)	2	Hydrogen electric	NYCT
	New Flyer; XE60 Xcelsior CHARGE; Articulated	2025-2026	60 ft (18 m)	5603-5620 (18 buses)	1 under delivery	Battery electric	NYCT
	New Flyer; XD60 Xcelsior; Articulated	2026-2028	60 ft (18 m)	6287-6956 (670 buses)	84 under delivery	Diesel	NYCT
	New Flyer; XE40 Xcelsior CHARGE	2026-2028	40 ft (12 m)	5030-5216 (187 buses)	18 under delivery	Battery electric	NYCT

=== Express bus fleet ===
All express buses are diesel-powered, 45 ft (14 m) long commuter coaches. All buses are high-floored.

Image	Type	Model year	Numbers (total)	Approximate amount active	Operator
	Motor Coach Industries; D4500CL	2004-2007	3000-3474 (475 buses)	42 retiring	MTA Bus
	Motor Coach Industries; D4500CT	2008	2195-2250 (56 buses)	37 retiring	MTA Bus
	Prevost; X3-45 Commuter; 1st Generation	2011	2400-2489 (90 buses)	31 retiring	NYCT
	Motor Coach Industries; D4500CT	2012-2013	2251-2303 (53 buses)	53	MTA Bus & NYCT
	Prevost; X3-45 Commuter; 1st Generation	2014-2016	2490-2789 (300 buses)	276	NYCT
	Prevost; X3-45 Commuter; 2nd Generation	2021-2022	1300-1629 (330 buses)	330	MTA Bus & NYCT
	Prevost; X3-45 Commuter; 2nd Generation	2025-2026	1630-2020 (391 buses)	292 under delivery	MTA Bus & NYCT

=== Future bus fleet ===
These are bus orders that will occur a few years into the future.

Type	Model year	Length	Numbers (total)	Energy source	Operator
New Flyer; XD40 Xcelsior	2026-2027	40 ft (12 m)	3475-3532 (58 buses)	Diesel	NYCT
New Flyer; XDE40 Xcelsior	2026-2028	40 ft (12 m)	3633-3878 (246 buses)	Diesel-electric hybrid	NYCT
Nova Bus; LFS TL40102A; 4th Generation	2027	40 ft (12 m)	3533-3632 (100 buses)	Diesel	NYCT
Motor Coach Industries; D45 CRT LE CHARGE	2028+	45 ft (14 m)	TBA (5 buses)	Battery electric	NYCT
New Flyer; XE60 Xcelsior CHARGE; Next Generation; Articulated	2028+	60 ft (18 m)	5621-5692 (72 buses)	Battery electric	NYCT
Motor Coach Industries; D45 CRT	2028+	45 ft (14 m)	TBA (92 buses)	Diesel	NYCT
New Flyer; XE40 Xcelsior CHARGE; Next Generation	2028+	40 ft (12 m)	3879-3986 (108 buses)	Battery electric	MTA Bus & NYCT
