= Nova Bus LFS =

Low Floor Series (LFS)
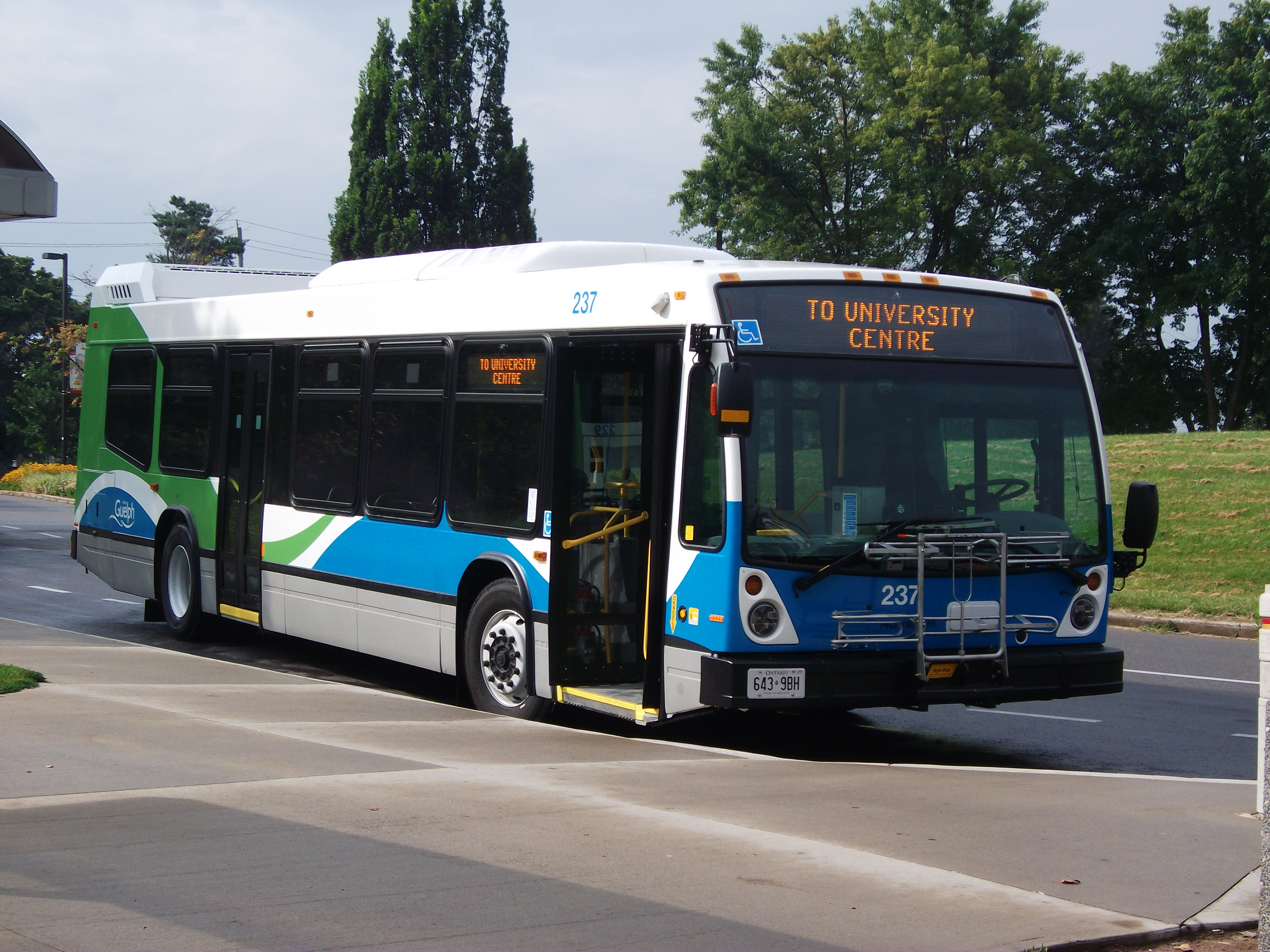
- 4th generation LFS owned by Guelph Transit.

Overview
- Manufacturer: Nova Bus
- Production: 1996–present
- Assembly: Canada: Saint-Eustache, Quebec; United States: Roswell, New Mexico (1996–2002); Plattsburgh, New York (2009–2025)

Body and chassis
- Class: Transit bus
- Body style: Monocoque stressed skin: Single-decker rigid bus; Single-decker articulated bus
- Doors: 1 or 2 doors (40’); 2 or 3 doors (62’)
- Floor type: Low-floor

Powertrain
- Engine: Diesel: Cummins L9; Hybrid: Cummins B6.7 or L9; CNG: Cummins-Westport L9N; Former: Cummins C8.3, ISC, ISB, ISL, ISL-G, ISL9, Detroit Diesel Series 40
- Transmission: Allison B 400, B 500, B3400XFE, H 40 (40' hybrid) or H 50 (62' hybrid); BAE HDS200 (40' hybrid) or HDS300 (62' hybrid); Voith D864.6; ZF EcoLife

Dimensions
- Wheelbase: 244 in (6.20 m) - 40'; 497 in (12.62 m) - 62' (Front-Mid 244 in (6.20 m), Mid-Rear 253 in (6.43 m))
- Length: 40 ft (12.19 m); 62 ft (18.90 m)
- Width: 102 in (2.59 m)
- Height: 124 in (3.15 m) - Diesel; 128 in (3.25 m) - Hybrid

Chronology
- Predecessor: Rapid Transit Series (after 2003); Classic (transit bus)

The Nova Bus LFS (an initialism of Low Floor Series) is a series of transit buses manufactured by Nova Bus for the North American market since 1996. It is produced in 40' rigid and 62' articulated (nominal) lengths with a variety of powertrains, including conventionally-fueled (diesel and natural gas), hybrid diesel-electric, and battery-electric. The LFS is the first transit bus designed by Nova Bus.

As of 2026, the LFS series is available exclusively in Canada; it was previously available in the United States from 1996 to 2002, and from 2009 to 2025.

== History ==
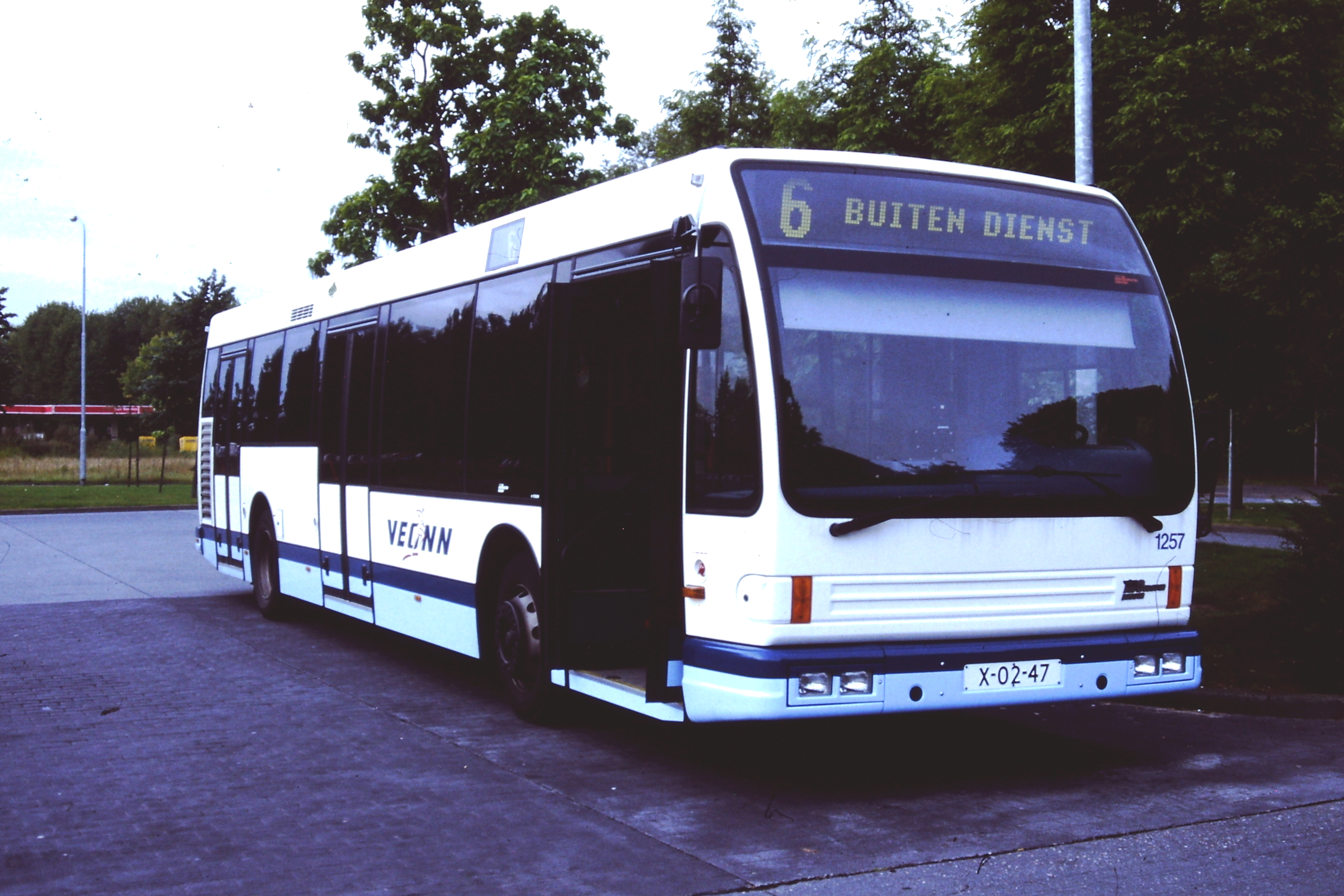
Den Oudsten B96 Alliance City, facelifted B90

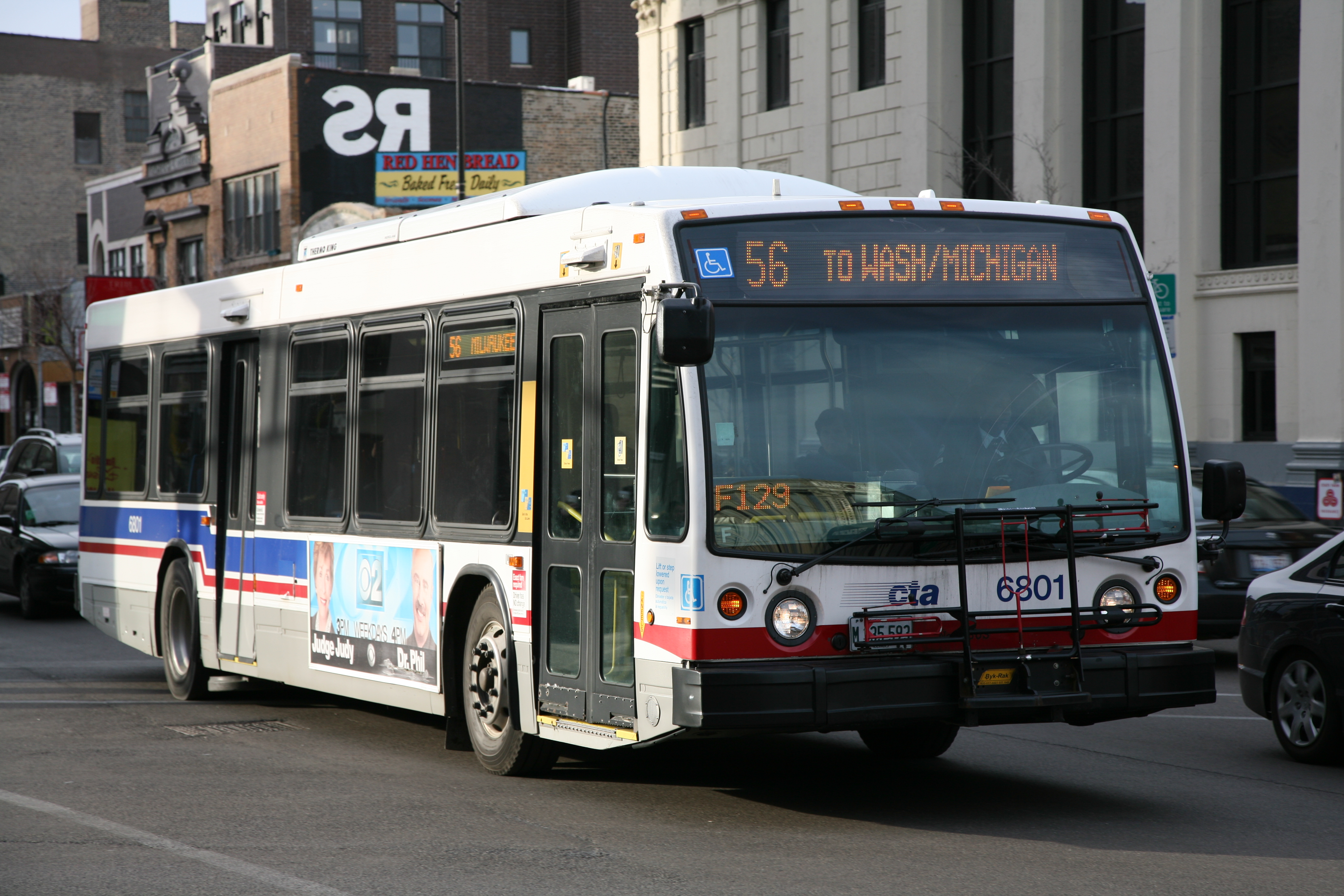
NovaBus LFS (Gen 2) for Chicago Transit Authority

=== Development ===
After taking over the former GM bus plant in Saint-Eustache, Quebec from Motor Coach Industries (MCI) in 1993, Yvon Lafortune, who had previously headed the Venus automotive project for Bombardier Inc., was named president of Nova Bus.

Nova Bus management was invited by the Quebec government to design and produce a low-floor bus similar to the style popular in the European market. The limited engineering staff that was acquired by Nova Bus along with the bus plant had never before designed a complete bus; the Classic that was still being produced at the time of acquisition was an updated version of the GM New Look bus, which had been designed by General Motors in the late 1950s. After sixteen months of negotiations, nine transit agencies in Quebec placed a final order of 330 Classic buses plus 60 low-floor buses to be delivered at the end of the contract.

Because low-floor buses were uncommon in North America, Nova Bus signed a technology transfer agreement to adapt the Dutch low-floor Den Oudsten Alliance bus. A demonstration Den Oudsten B90 Alliance City bus and engineering staff were sent from the Netherlands; however, by 1994 Den Oudsten was in financial trouble, eventually declaring bankruptcy in 2001. Den Oudsten was unable to collaborate further with Nova Bus after sending the City Alliance, and Nova Bus then had to design a low-floor bus alone to meet the challenging North American standard "white book" specifications. The New Look-derived Classic used a riveted structure, and the Den Oudsten bus used a welded tubular spaceframe, which required Nova Bus to set up a separate factory to manufacture frames in Saint-François-du-Lac.

My thinking was that of a car. It wasn't that of a tractor. [...] I wanted to create something friendly, and a little naive. A guide. Someone who takes you by the hand and leads you to your destination. I saw the headlights as wide-open eyes. The signature formed what looked like nostrils.

— Jean Labbé, La Presse, Nov 2019

Louis Côté was hired as the head of body design. Industrial designer Jean Labbé, who had also worked on the Bombardier Venus, was recruited by Lafortune to design the exterior and layout of the LFS. Labbé deliberately chose automobile-like styling which he intended to be "friendly, and a little naive" with "eyes wide open" and a signature triple-oval "nostril" feature centred under the windshield. Côté modified the design to use an off-the-shelf bumper, as the custom bumper specified by Labbé was thought to be too expensive.

The first LFS prototype was shown at the triennial fall 1994 American Public Transportation Association show in Boston; to meet that deadline, design and fabrication teams worked around the clock. Two prototypes were eventually produced, with one exhibited at APTA '94 in Boston, and the other sent to Altoona for testing. It was the second low-floor bus to be offered in North America, following the New Flyer Low Floor series, which had been introduced in 1991.

In parallel, Detroit Diesel had announced that they would begin to wind down production of the Series 71 and Series 92 two-stroke diesel engines which had powered most North American transit buses since the 1950s; the two stroke technology could not be modified to comply with new US EPA regulations, and production ceased in 1998. While Nova Bus's initial plan was to introduce the low-floor LFS as an alternative to the lower cost Classic, keeping both in production, the initial release of the Cummins-powered Classic "T-Drive" in 1995 was underdeveloped and plagued with severe reliability problems. A decision was made to concentrate development resources on the new LFS and to discontinue the Classic as soon as the LFS was in full production.

=== Production ===
Further development postponed production until 1996. Initially, Nova Bus planned to produce a prototype pilot fleet of 80 LFS buses for evaluation in revenue service by four major Quebec transit properties; the resulting reliability and service data would be used to further refine the design before entering serial production. These plans were canceled by the discontinuation of the Detroit Diesel engines, loss of the Den Oudsten partnership, and trouble-plagued Classic T-Drive launch, and the LFS was pressed into production.

Rear end / taillight evolution

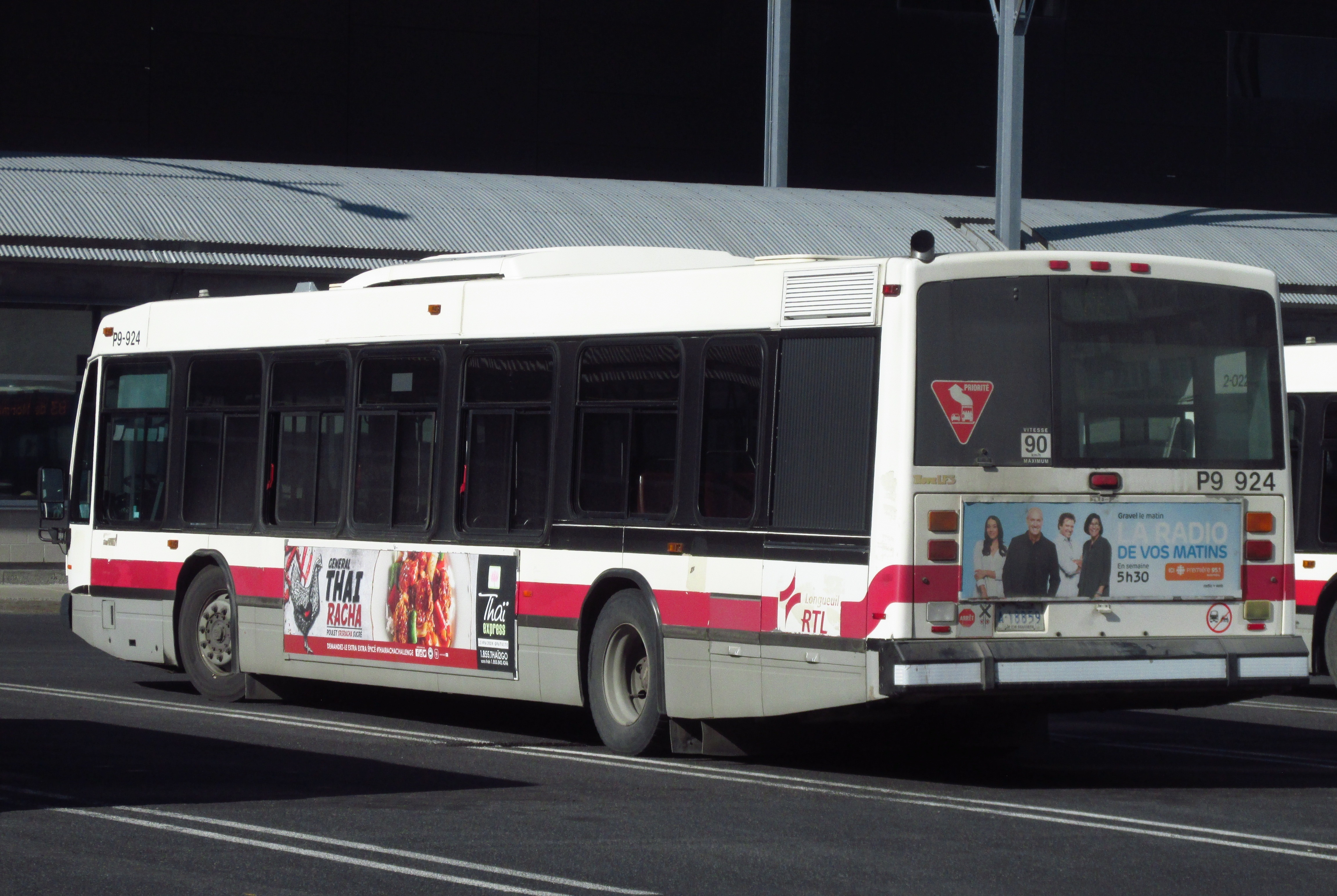
1st gen; cooling access hatch at left and rear window offset right, rectangular taillights

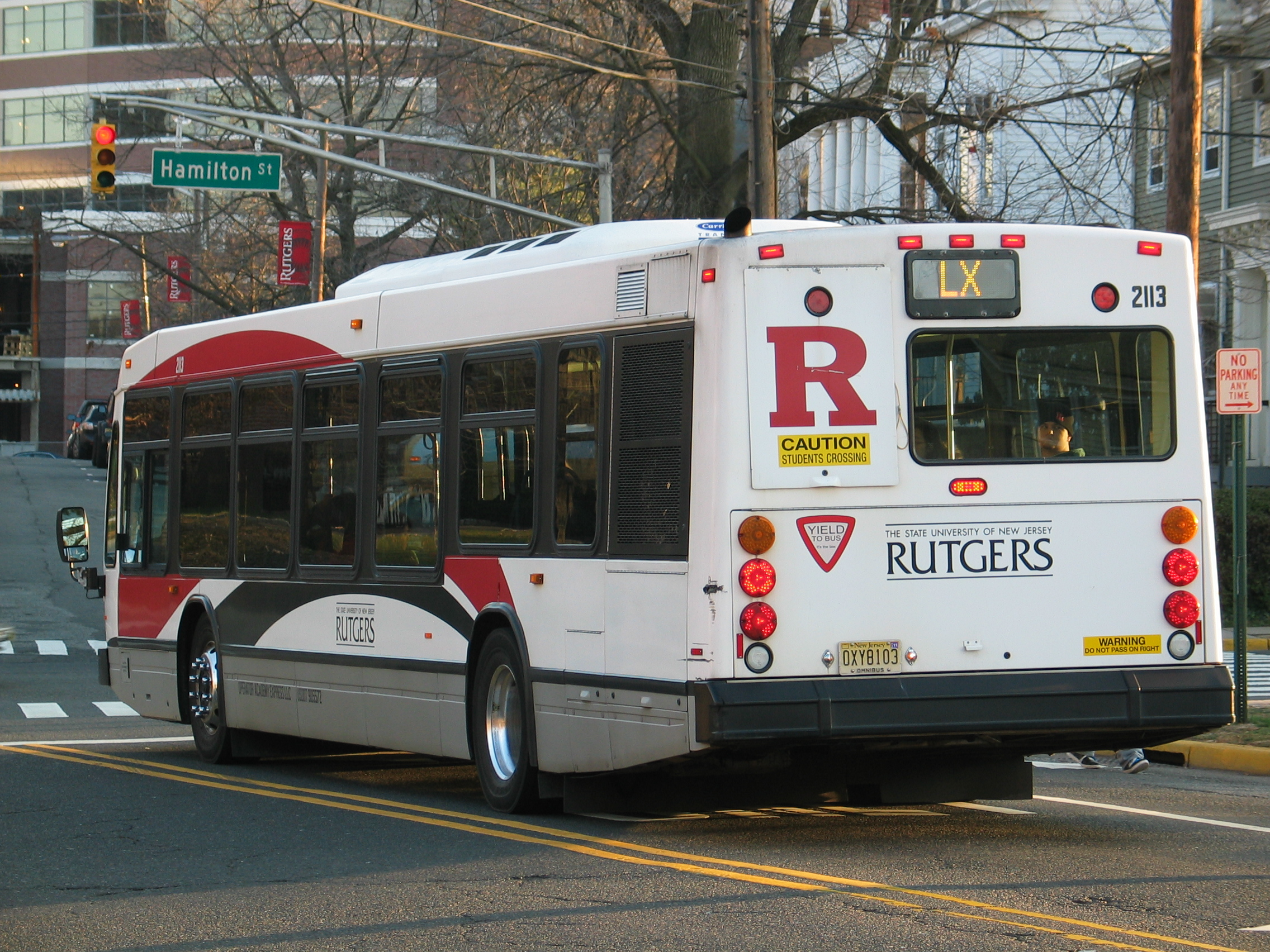
2nd gen; round taillights

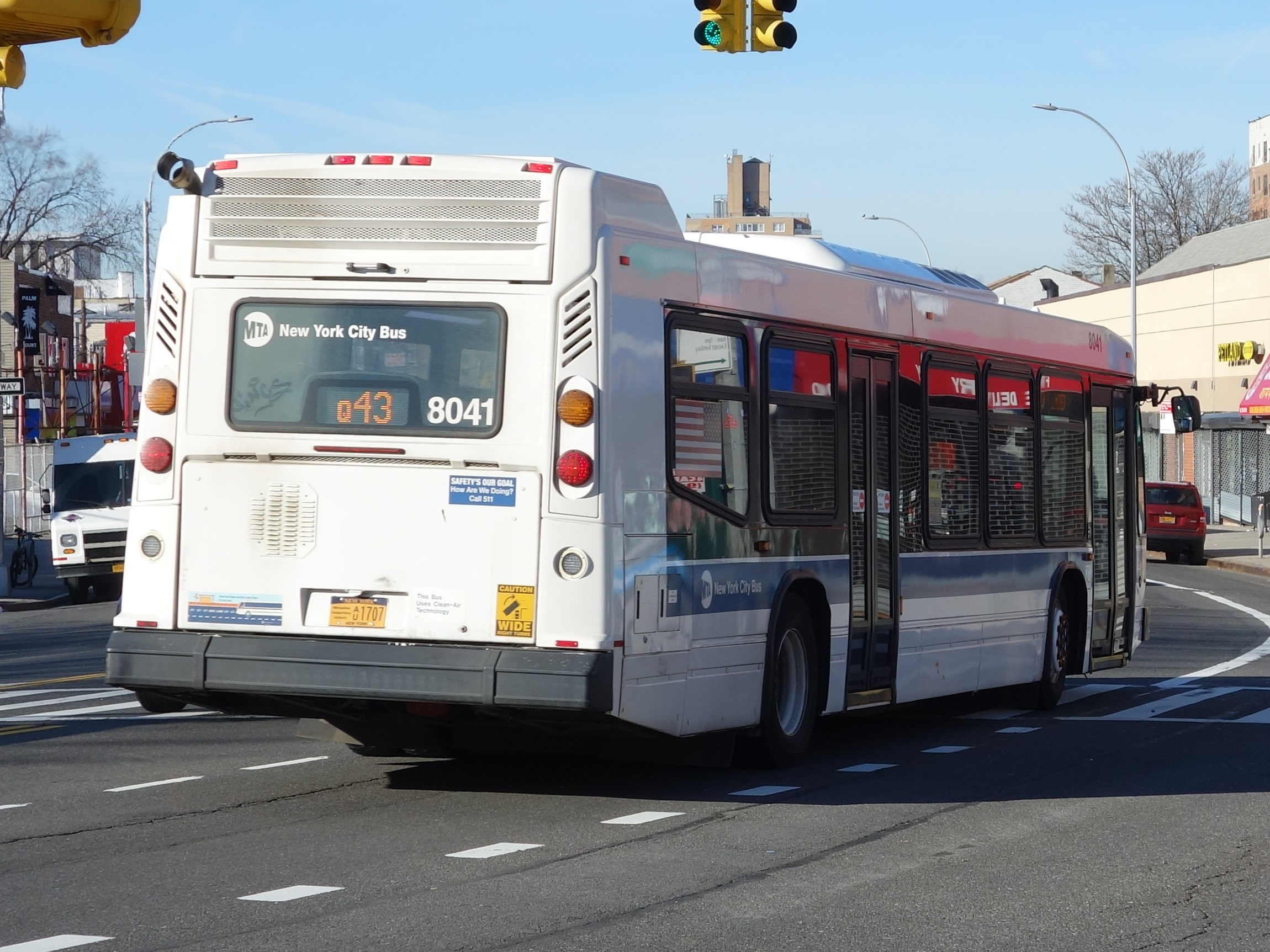
3rd gen; cooling above rear window, full-height taillight panel

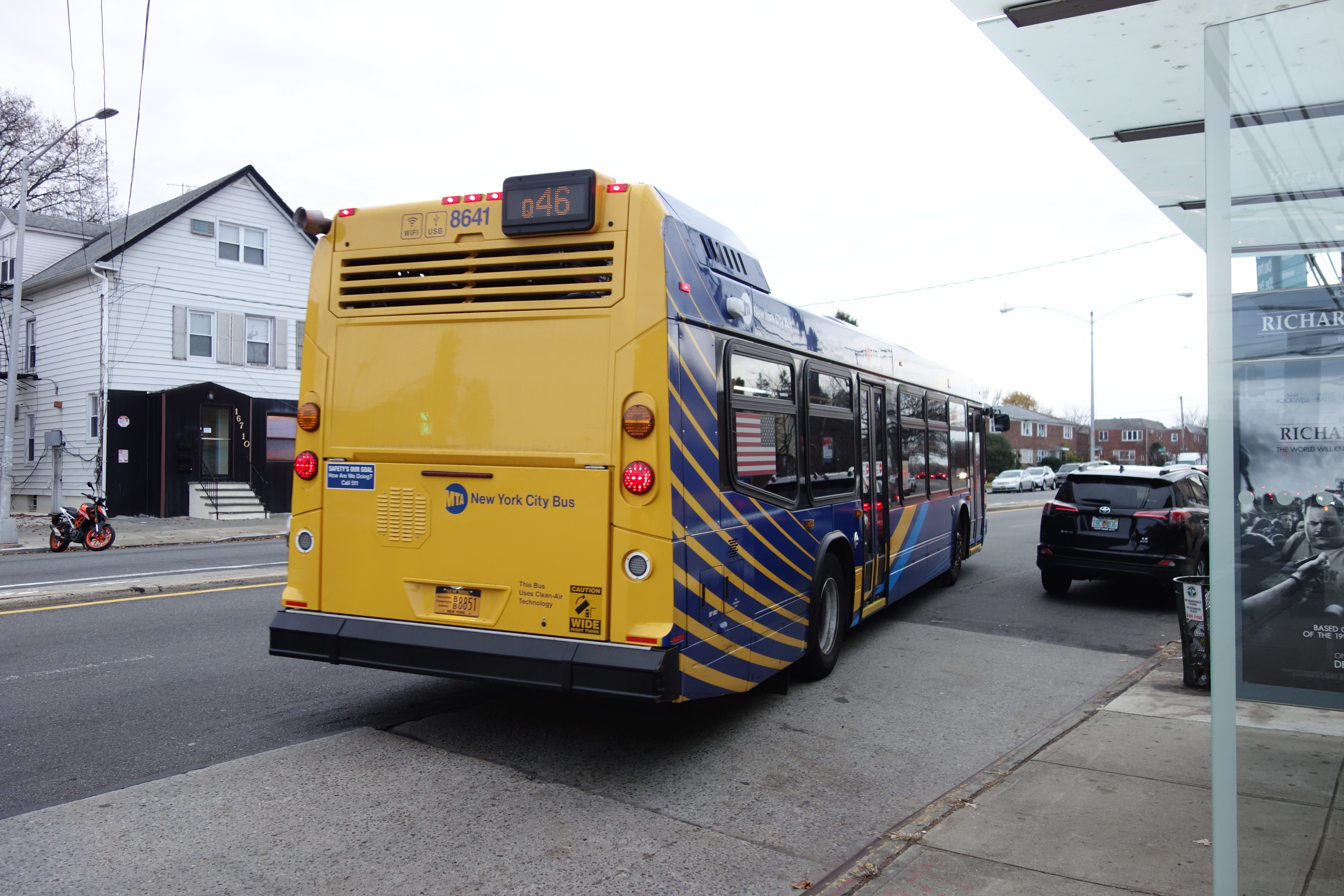
4th gen; revised cooling unit and taillight panel (sans rear window)

By the time the first LFS (delivered to STCUM as 16-004) entered revenue service at the end of 1996, about 400 LFS were already built, awaiting acceptance from the same Quebec properties. These early LFS were also plagued with reliability and serviceability problems, receiving 2,500 complaints during the first eighteen months of service; but unlike the Cummins-powered Classics, the problems were throughout the bus and not concentrated on the drivetrain.

Because the Den Oudsten bus from which it was derived had an option for a third passenger door, the engine compartment of the first generation LFS was displaced towards the driver's side, even though no agency took the third door option on the LFS. In addition, the reduced offset engine space meant that a smaller Cummins engine was fitted, leading some transit agencies to immediately disqualify the LFS from purchase. Frame material was switched to stainless steel in 1998 for the second generation due to premature corrosion of the early LFS buses; of the 451 that had been delivered to STCUM, 400 were scrapped before their mandated 16-year lifetime.

An interest in Nova Bus was acquired by Volvo Buses in 1997; Volvo took full control in 2004, leading to the third generation, which moved the engine to the centreline of the bus and dropped the option for the third door.

To meet 'Buy American' requirements for the United States market, LFS buses were assembled for the Chicago Transit Authority (and other transit agencies) in a plant in Niskayuna, New York until that plant closed in 2002 and Nova Bus withdrew to concentrate on the Canadian market. It re-entered the United States market in 2009 after opening a new plant in Plattsburgh, New York. The Chicago order, placed in 1998, was the first major US win for Nova Bus, with more than 400 LFS buses delivered.

By 2019, 12,500 LFS buses had been produced to 125 operators; annual production is approximately 1000 LFS buses per year, and Nova Bus has captured nearly 70% of the Canadian market.

== Models ==
The current LF is offered in several transit bus variants:

Model	Length		Type
Model	40 feet (12 m)	62 feet (19 m) articulated	Type
LFS			Standard
LFX			Bus rapid transit (BRT)
LFS HEV			Hybrid Electric Vehicle
LFS CNG			Compressed Natural Gas
LFSe/LFSe+			Battery electric bus

LFS Shuttle and LFS Suburban are additional variants outside of the regular transit bus products offered. The LFS Shuttle and the LFS Suburban have some features from commuter coaches, with all forward-facing seats and no rear exit. In addition, Nova Bus was working on an electric variant with multiple power source options, which came out in 2019 as the LFSe+.

=== Variants ===
NovaBus LFS variants
Series Generation				Notes
1st	2nd	3rd	4th	
LFS (1996+)				
				Generations are most easily distinguished by taillight configuration. 3rd & 4th generations have cooling units at rear roof.
Not produced		LFSA (2009+)		
Not produced		2012 Novabus LFSA Articulated (5887) lays up at Park Row & Beekman Street		Articulated, Introduced with 3rd gen.
Not produced	LFS Suburban (2005+)			
Not produced				Single-door, intended for longer distance "suburban" routes
Not produced	LFS HEV (2006+)			
Not produced				40' rigid Diesel-electric hybrid
Not produced		LFSA HEV (2011+)		
Not produced				62' articulated diesel-electric hybrid
Not produced		LFX 40' (2009+)		
Not produced				Bus rapid transit styling, offered with diesel-electric hybrid powertrain
Not produced		LFX 62' (2011+)		
Not produced				Bus rapid transit styling, offered with diesel-electric hybrid powertrain
Not produced		LFSe (2011+)		
Not produced				Battery-electric bus, offered only in 40' length.
Not produced		LFSe+ (2019+)		
Not produced		Not produced		Battery-electric bus, offered only in 40' length. Improved LFSe, includes modular battery pack with higher capacities.
Not produced		Not produced	LFS CNG (2013+)	
Not produced		Not produced		Formerly LFS Natural Gas. Uses compressed natural gas fuel, offered only for 40' length

== Generations ==
The LFS began production in 1995 and has since expanded to the current model range.

LFS regular production series
=== 1st generation (1995-99) ===
Description: Large, one-piece windshield; Large round headlamps; Mild steel space frame; Full low floor layout with a sloped floor over rear axle; Offset T-drive powertrain
Type	Models	Example (1998 & 1999 shown)
Transit	40 ft (12.2 m) × 102 in (2.59 m)	
=== 2nd generation (1999-2009) === 40' HEV 1st Generation
Description: Restyled rear end; Stainless steel space frame; Full low floor layout discontinued in 2005 for partial low floor layout (with steps to raised section over rear axle); Headlamp cluster restyled in 2007; Hybrid-electric (HEV) powertrain started as an option in 2007
Type	Models	Example (2007 shown)
Transit	40 ft (12.2 m) × 102 in (2.59 m)	
=== 3rd generation (2009-13) === 40' HEV 2nd Generation 60' HEV 1st Generation LFX 1st Generation LFSe 1st Generation Articulated 1st Generation
Description: Centered T-drive powertrain; Cooling system moved to roof to accommodate bulky smog control equipment creating a roof spoiler; Taillight configuration updated; Flush-mounted windows optional; Articulated variant available; Restyled front and rear; Rear window; Floor board material changed from plywood to synthetic honeycomb; 60' articulated HEV introduced in 2011; LFX 40' introduced in 2009; LFX 60' introduced in 2011; LFSe introduced in 2011
Type	Models	Example (2010 shown)
Transit	40 ft (12.2 m) × 102 in (2.59 m)	
Articulated	62 ft (18.9 m) × 102 in (2.59 m); Introduced April 2009; Articulated HEV introduced 2011; Higher (330 hp) engine rating to address increased weight	
=== 4th generation (2013-present) === 40' HEV 3rd Generation Articulated 2nd Generation 60' HEV 2nd Generation LFX 2nd Generation LFSe 2nd Generation LFSe+ 1st Generation CNG 1st Generation
Description: New rear design for EPA 2013 engines; Natural gas offered as fuel option; Restyled rear end and interior; Features electric cooling fans (prior generations used hydraulic fans); Rear window delete option; As of 2018, optional driver's side window without the additional side pillar; New A/C unit configuration introduced in 2021 on the MTA's new order of diesel LFS's; LFSe+ introduced in 2019
Type	Models	Example (2016 shown)
Transit	40 ft (12.2 m) × 102 in (2.59 m)	
Articulated	62 ft (18.9 m) × 102 in (2.59 m); Higher engine rating to address increased weight	

== See also ==
- Rapid Transit Series - the predecessor to the LFS.

Competitive models

- Gillig Low Floor
- Proterra ZX5
- New Flyer Xcelsior
- New Flyer Low Floor - Discontinued
- NABI BRT - Discontinued
- NABI LFW - Discontinued
- Neoplan AN440L - Discontinued
- Orion VII - Discontinued
