= London Electrobus Company =

British bus operating company

- Founded: April 1906
- Headquarters: 1 Earl Street, Westminster
- Service area: London
- Service type: Bus services

The London Electrobus Company, was a bus operator that ran a fleet of electric buses in London. The electrobus was the first practical battery-electric bus and a forerunner of the electric buses that are experiencing a major resurgence in the 21st century.

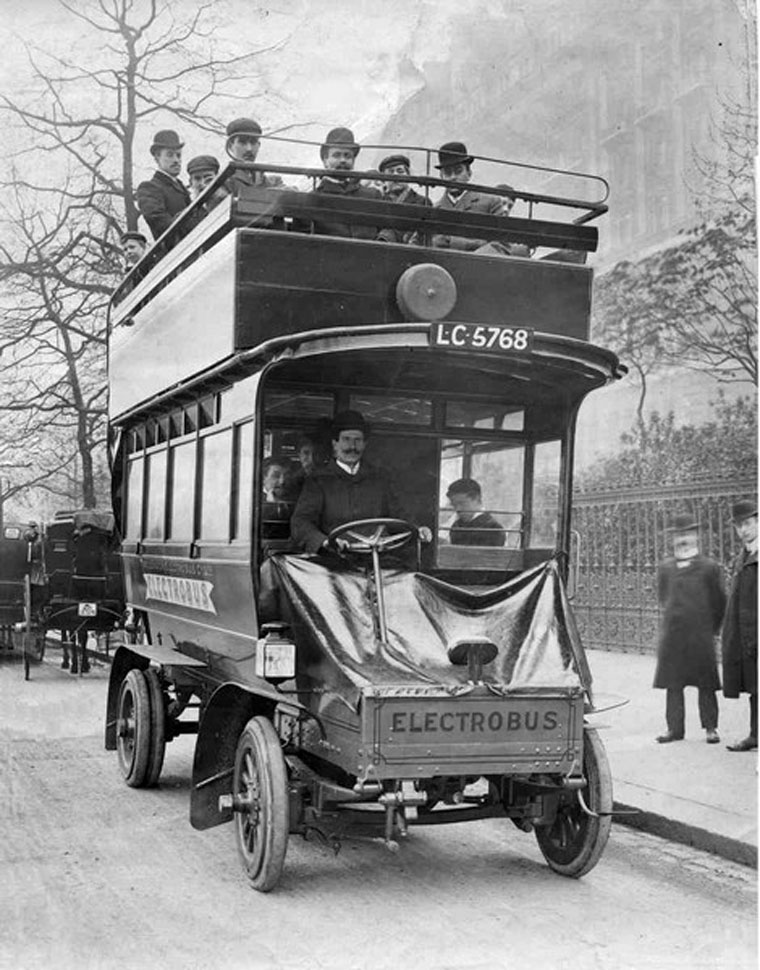
Electrobus in London (1906)

The company, which was first registered in April 1906, started running a service of electrobuses between London's Victoria Station and Liverpool Street on 15 July 1907. The clean and quiet electrobuses were popular with the travelling public. The company introduced a number of innovations and it was the first double-decker bus operator to experiment with a roof on the upper deck. At the peak of its success in late 1908 the company had 20 or so buses in operation and it started to run a second bus route from Victoria to Kilburn.

However, the London Electrobus Company was beset by financial chicanery throughout its short existence. By 3 January 1910 the electrobus service had ceased and the company went into liquidation amid accusations of fraud. Eight of the electrobuses were sold to the Brighton, Hove and Preston United company. The rest of the London electrobuses were broken up for spares. The Brighton bus company was taken over by Thomas Tilling in 1916 and the last electrobus in Brighton ran in April 1917. Tilling said that a lack of spare parts had forced it to stop running electrobuses.

== See also ==
- Buses in London
