= Sunu BRT =

Bus rapid transit

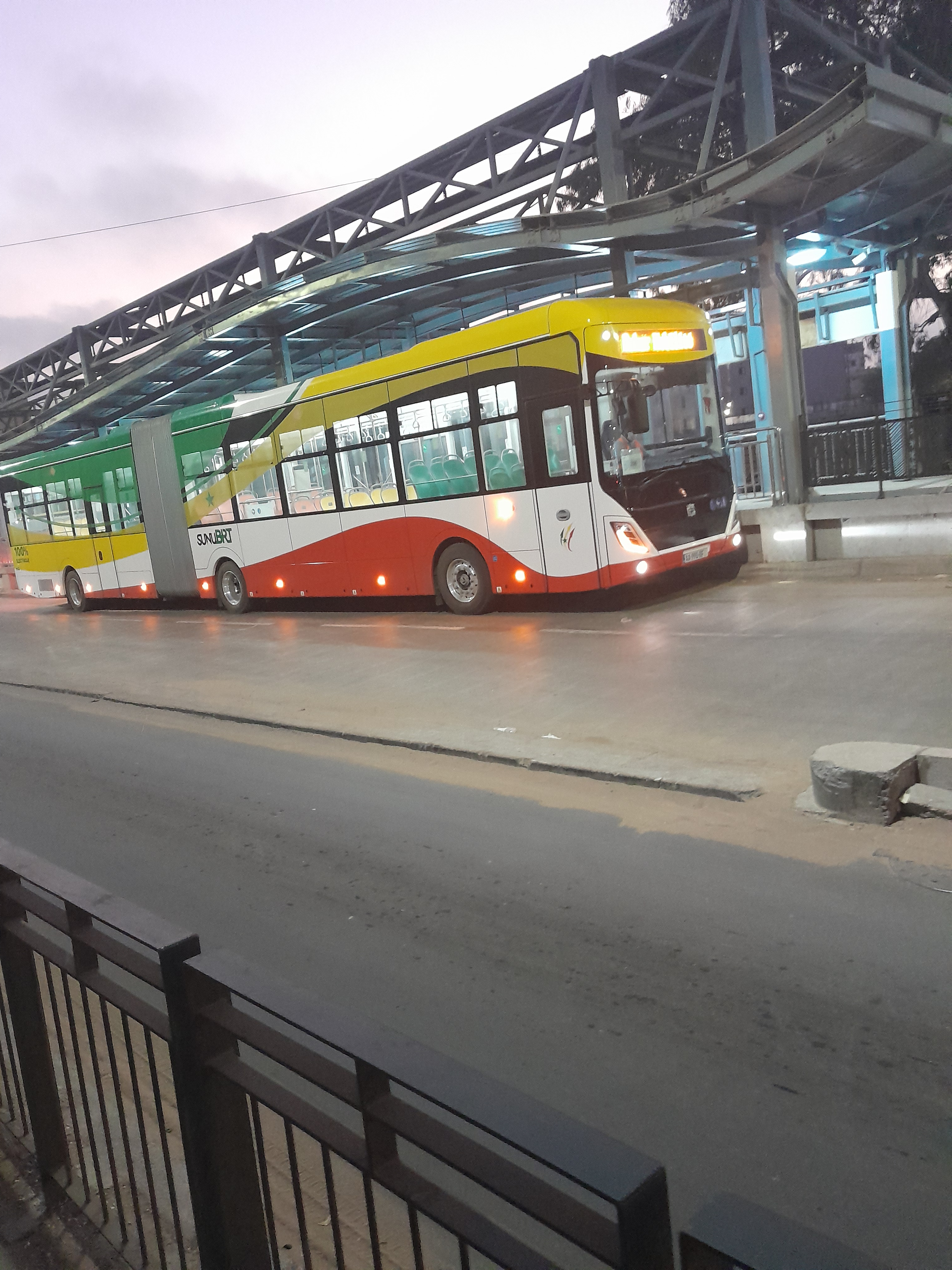
- Commenced operation: 14 January 2024
- Locale: Dakar, Senegal
- Routes: 2
- Stations: 23
- Website: https://www.sunubrt.sn/

Sunu BRT is a bus rapid transit (BRT) service using battery electric buses operating in Dakar, Senegal.

It currently has two lines: the B1 and the B2, connecting the Papa Gueye Fall station in downtown Dakar to the Guédiawaye department. Two more lines are also planned for the system: the B3 and B4 lines.

== History ==
Construction on the system began in 2020. The civil works contract was awarded to and carried out by China Road and Bridge Corporation (CRBC), and the operating vehicles were supplied by CRRC Group.

The network was inaugurated in January 2024 with the first two lines, the B1 and B2, operating between the stations of Papa Gueye Fall and Préfecture de Guédiawaye.

== Routes ==
The network includes a high-level bus service link with 14 stations spread over 18.3 kilometres (11.4 mi), equipped with a central platform and platform screen doors similar to those of a metro.

=== Line B1 ===
Line B1, also called the Omnibus, runs from the Papa Gueye Fall station in downtown Dakar to Préfecture de Guédiawaye. The route operates every 6 minutes from 6 A.M. to 9 P.M from Monday through Saturday. On Sundays and on holidays, it runs every 10 minutes from 6 A.M. to 11 A.M., and then every 7 minutes from 11 A.M. to 9 P.M.

=== Line B2 ===
Line B2, also called the Semi-Express, also runs from the Papa Gueye Fall station in downtown Dakar to Préfecture de Guédiawaye, although it only makes seven stops along the way, significantly less than the B1. Line B2 operates every 6 minutes from 6 A.M. to 9 P.M. on Monday through Saturday.

=== Planned lines ===
Sunu BRT has two more planned lines: the B3, and the B4.
