= Transbus =

Transbus may refer to:

- TransBus International, a division of Dennis Specialist Vehicles
- Transbus Program, a 1970s United States program to develop improvements to transit bus design
