= GM Whirlfire engine =

Free-turbine turboshaft engine

Whirlfire
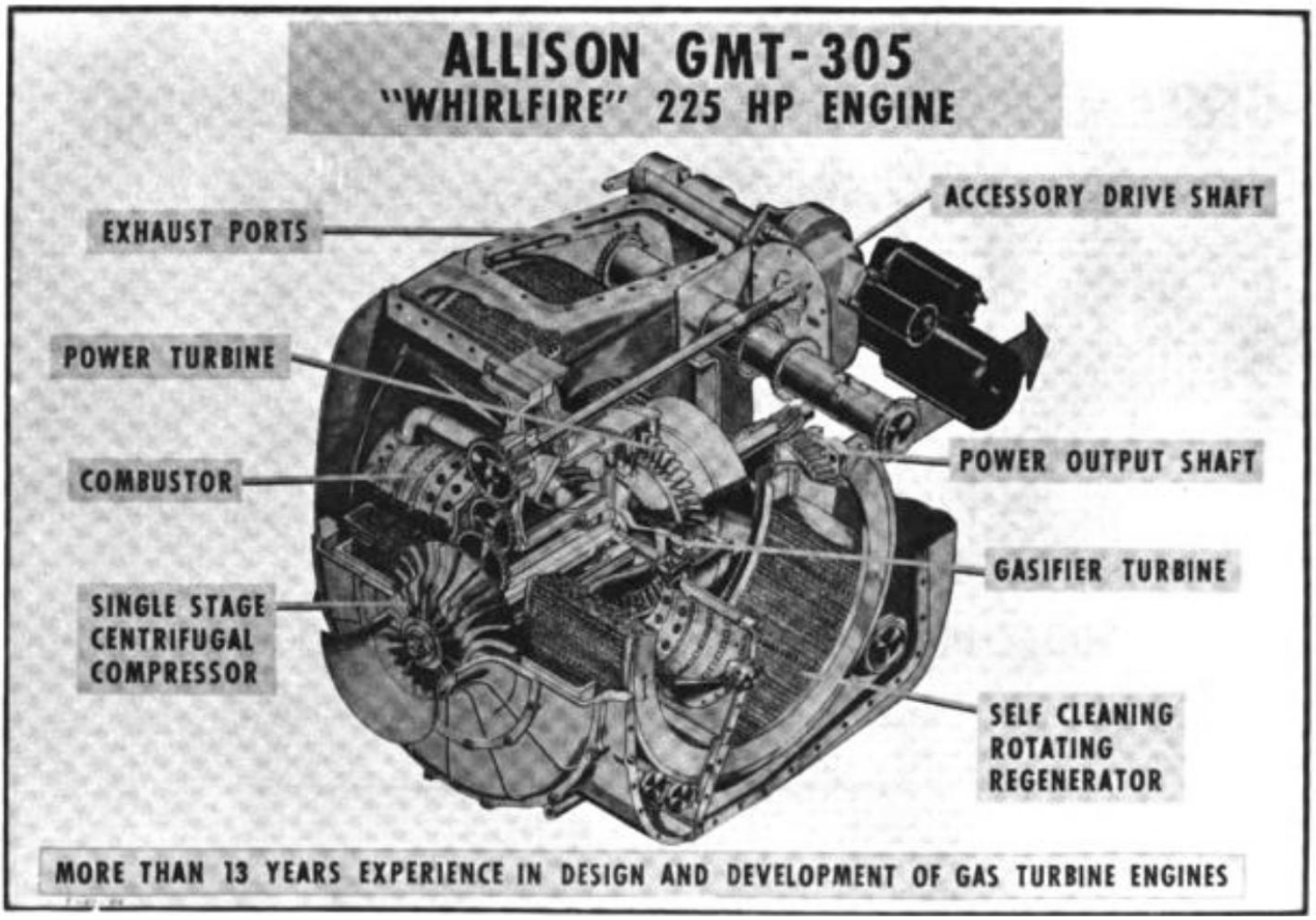
- Cutaway of the Detroit Diesel Allison GMT-305, the commercialized derivative of the GT-305 Whirlfire gas turbine engine

Overview
- Manufacturer: General Motors Research / Detroit Diesel Allison
- Production: 1953–83

Layout
- Compression ratio: single-stage, rotary

Combustion
- Operating principle: free-turbine turboshaft

The GM Whirlfire gas turbine engines were developed in the 1950s by the research division of General Motors Corporation and fitted to concept vehicles, including the Firebird concept cars, Turbo-Cruiser buses, and Turbo-Titan trucks through the 1960s. They are free-turbine turboshaft machines with two spools: one compressor/gasifier turboshaft and one power/output turboshaft sharing a common axis without a mechanical coupling between them. Fuel consumption of the first-generation GT-300 was high compared to piston engines, so thermal wheel regenerators were added to the second-generation GT-304, cutting consumption by approximately half.

Initially, the engines were built by GM Research, but starting with the third generation GT-305, the Allison Engine division took over responsibility for commercializing gas turbine technology. This division, later merged with Detroit Diesel and renamed Detroit Diesel Allison, would produce approximately one hundred of the final design GT-404 engines, which incorporated ceramic components. Cost, driven by exotic turbine alloys and materials, and fuel consumption proved to be insoluble issues compared to conventional piston engines and further development of gas turbine engines at General Motors was discontinued in the early 1980s.

== Design ==
Because the Whirlfire engines are free-turbine machines, maximum torque is developed when the output shaft is stalled (not turning), and is approximately double the torque developed at full power output. In addition, the lowest fuel consumption is achieved at full power.

=== Gas path ===
In the third-generation GT/GMT-305, the air intake is arranged axially with the turboshafts, which share a common horizontal axis. The single-stage rotary compressor draws air at atmospheric conditions through the intake and expels compressed air out radially into the side compartments, where the rotating drum-shaped regenerators preheat the compressed air using heat extracted from the exhaust gases. The compressed air is channeled through the combustors, where it is mixed with fuel and burned, and the resulting combustion gases are expanded through first the gasifier turbine, which is on the same shaft and is used to drive the rotary compressor, then through the power turbine, which is on the output shaft.

At the gasifier turbine inlet, the design temperature is 1,650 °F (900 °C). For the GMT-305, the rotary speed of the gasifier/compressor shaft is 33,000 RPM, while the power shaft turns at 24,000 RPM at full power; the power shaft speed is stepped down to 3,500 RPM through reduction gearing at the output to make it compatible with automotive components. A governor allows the output shaft to turn up to 4,500 RPM. An accessory shaft is driven from the gasifier/compressor shaft for engine ancillaries, including a gear-type lubrication oil pump.

=== Regeneration ===
Initially, the first engines developed (GT-300 and 302) did not have a regenerator, but adding regeneration to recapture heat from the exhaust gases was found to reduce fuel consumption by 1/2 for the second-generation GT-304, so subsequent generations of GM Whirlfire gas turbine engines incorporated a regenerator.

For the GT/GMT-305, two drum regenerators are arranged to either side of the turboshafts in large compartments; the regenerators turn at approximately 30 RPM. Within each side compartment, a vertical bulkhead divides the regenerators into low-pressure exhaust (occupying approximately 2/3 of the regenerator) and high-pressure inlet (the remaining 1/3) sections. As a regenerator rotates through the exhaust section, it picks up waste heat from the exhaust gases, then as it continues to rotate into the inlet section, the heat is transferred to the compressed air, preheating it before fuel is added in the combustors.

In addition to improving thermodynamic efficiency, the regenerators serve to muffle engine noise and heat, reducing exhaust temperatures. The exhaust section operates at a lower pressure than the inlet section, so regenerator sealing is important to minimize loss of high-pressure compressed air.

=== Engine braking ===
In a conventional piston engine, engine braking can be used to slow a vehicle without use of the friction brakes; because the power turbine is not mechanically connected to the compressor in a free-turbine turboshaft engine, a similar effect cannot be accomplished. During the development of the Whirlfire engines, GM found the gasifier turbine could generate more power than was required to operate the compressor, so for the fifth-generation GT-309 (1964), GM and Allison coupled the gasifier and power turboshafts using a clutch to extract some of that surplus power. The resulting system, which Allison branded Power Transfer, gave the GT-309 an engine braking effect and improved fuel economy at partial load.

=== Fuel ===
As external combustion engines, the GM Whirlfire gas turbines were capable of burning a wide variety of fuels; for example turbine engines burning powdered coal were fitted to a Cadillac Eldorado and Oldsmobile Delta 88 in the early 1980s as a response to the 1979 oil crisis. Other potential sources of fuel included methanol, ethanol, liquefied coal, and shale oil.

== Models ==
Whirlfire gas turbine specifications
Engine	Output		Turboshaft speed (RPM)		BSFC (lb/hp·hr)	Weight	Applications	Notes & Refs.
Engine	Power	Torque	Gasifier	Power	BSFC (lb/hp·hr)	Weight	Applications	Notes & Refs.
GT-300	325 hp (242 kW)		26,000	13,000	1.63	775 lb (352 kg)	Turbo-Cruiser I	No regenerator
GT-302	370 hp (280 kW)		26,000	13,000	1.63	775 lb (352 kg)	Firebird I	Two-burner version of GT-300
GT-304	200 hp (150 kW)		35,000	28,000	0.77	850 lb (390 kg)	Firebird II, Turbo-Titan I	First to be equipped with a regenerator to improve fuel consumption
GT-305	225 hp (168 kW)		33,000	27,000	0.55	600–650 lb (270–290 kg)	Firebird III, Turbo-Titan II	Commercialized by Detroit Diesel Allison Division as GMT-305
GT-309	280 hp (210 kW)	875 lb⋅ft (1,186 N⋅m)	35,700	35,000	0.45	950 lb (430 kg)	Turbo-Titan III, Turbo-Cruiser II/III, RTX, RTS 3T	"Power Transfer" system enables engine braking
GT-404	325 hp (242 kW)	595 lb⋅ft (807 N⋅m)	37,103	30,830	0.475	1,700 lb (770 kg)	GMC Astro, MCI MC-8, RTS (prototypes)	

=== GT-300/302 ===
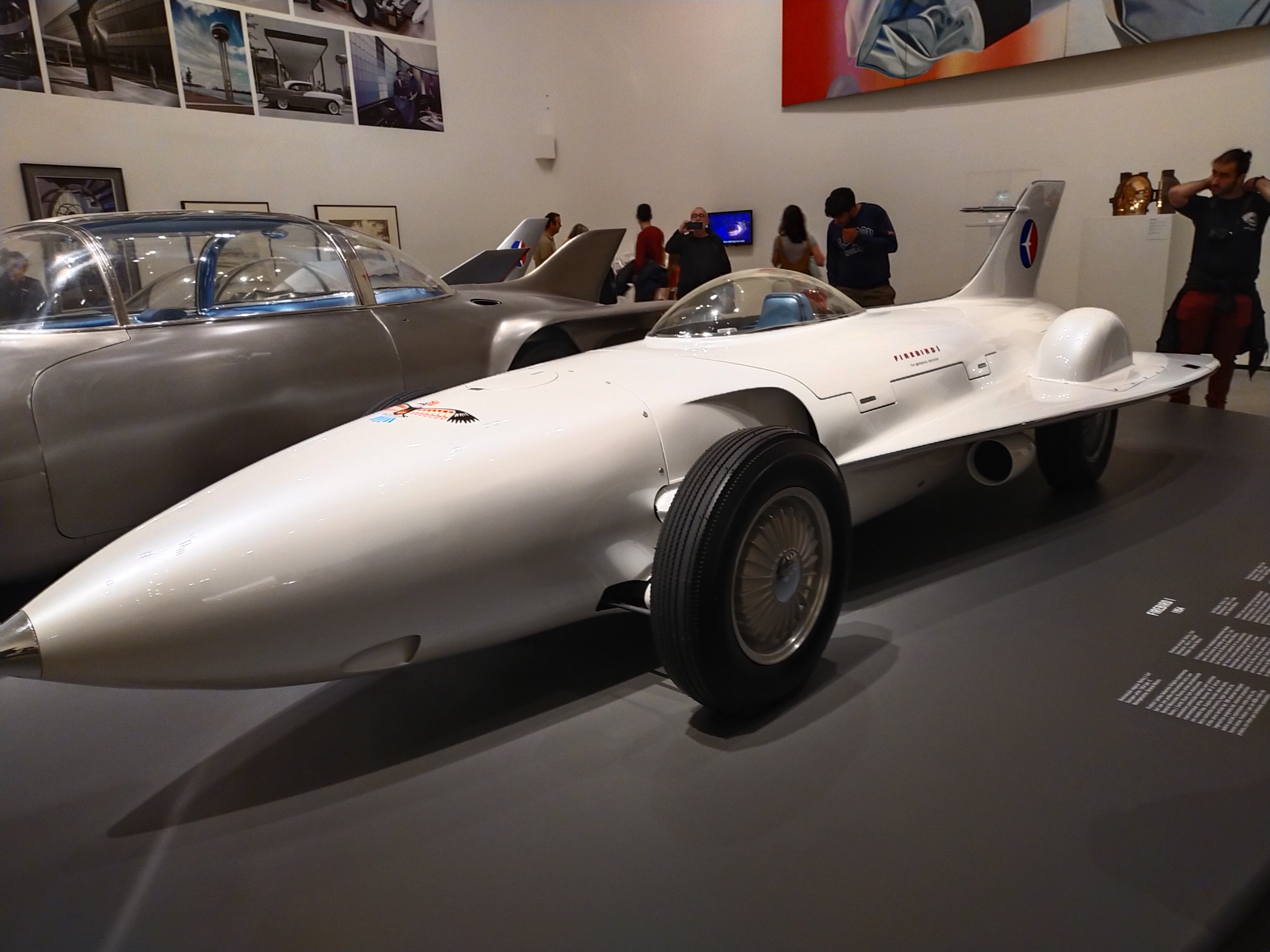
Firebird I / XP-21 is powered by the GT-302

The first engine, carrying an internal designation of GT-300 (1953), did not have a regenerator. The GT-300 had an output of 370 hp (280 kW) when the gasifier (compressor) turbine was spinning at 26,000 RPM and the free (power) turbine was spinning at 13,000 RPM. The weight of the entire engine unit was 775 lb (352 kg). The GT-300 was fitted to an "Old Look" transit bus, which was branded "Turbo-Cruiser". To reduce overall size, the single large burner was replaced by two smaller burners and the engine was re-designated GT-302, which was fitted to Firebird I (XP-21).

The GT-300 was designed with a 3.5:1 compression ratio and nominal design turboshaft speeds of 24,000 RPM (gasifier) and 12,000 RPM (power). Engine accessories are driven by the gasifier turboshaft through a perpendicular bevel gear arrangement; a conventional automotive starting motor is used to crank the accessory drive shaft (and gasifier turboshaft). A new nickel-base alloy, designated GMR-235, was developed and patented for the turbine blades in the Whirlfire engine.

Externally, the Turbo-Cruiser was distinguished from piston-powered buses by "turbocruiser" script lettering on the sides, blanked-out rear windows, and a large central exhaust stack at the roof. The rearmost seats were replaced by "a complete mobile laboratory with a large [rear-facing] instrumentation panel" for two engineers. Operating experience with the Turbo-Cruiser showed the engine's mechanical durability; according to W.A. Turunen, "on several occasions, pieces of instrumentation have passed through the machine. The turbine buckets were bent, but in no instance did they fail even after subsequent running of damaged parts." The bus accumulated 9,000 mi (14,000 km) in testing.

Brake-specific fuel consumption (BSFC) was a notable issue, which at 1.63 lb/hp·h was significantly greater than that of a comparable Detroit Diesel 8V71 diesel engine (approximately 0.40 lb/hp·h), even though the turbine was 1,500 lb (680 kg) lighter. Other planned improvements would target throttle lag, which was caused by accelerating the gasifier turbine to peak speed, and lack of engine braking.

=== GT-304 ===
GT-304 (1956) was the first GM gas turbine to include a regenerator, which used exhaust heat to warm intake air, improving fuel consumption to 0.77 lb/hp·h. As fitted to Firebird II, GT-304 output was 200 hp (150 kW) at a gasifier turbine speed of 35,000 RPM. The gasifier turbine idled at 15,000 RPM and the power turbine operated at up to 28,000 RPM. Overall compression ratio in the gasifier stage was 3.5:1. Turbine inlet temperature was increased to 1,650 °F (900 °C) from 1,500 °F (820 °C); after GM Research re-rated the temperature resistance of the GMR-235 superalloy. With the regenerators, the engine weight increased to 850 lb (390 kg); each regenerator was 150 lb (68 kg). 7.27:1 reduction gearing made the output shaft speed compatible with conventional automobile accessories. A fluid input coupling was used between the engine and transmission; in addition, larger accessories were powered from the transmission, not the gasifier turboshaft, as it had been discovered that at idle, accessory power draw could exceed available surplus power.

The GT-304 also was fitted to the first Turbo-Titan, a heavy-duty Chevrolet Model 10413 truck-tractor with tandem rear axles; Turbo-Titan was tested with various loads, demonstrating superior acceleration and gradeability compared to the Loadmaster V-8 engine that was removed, a 322 cu in (5.3 L) overhead valve V-8 with 195 hp (145 kW) output.

=== GT-305 ===
The GT-305 (1958) fitted to Firebird III had an output of 225 hp (168 kW) (at turbine speeds of 33,000 RPM gasifier / 27,000 RPM power) and weight of 600–650 lb (270–290 kg). With a regenerator and additional component refinements, GT-305 achieved a brake-specific fuel consumption of 0.55 lb/hp·h, an improvement of 25% compared to the earlier GT-304; similarly, the engine weight of the GT-305 was reduced by 25% compared to the 304. External dimensions were 37 in (940 mm) long, 27.8 in (710 mm) high, and 26 in (660 mm) wide. Exhaust temperature had been reduced considerably; the GT-305 exhaust was 520 °F (271 °C) at full power, decreasing to 275 °F (135 °C) at idle.

Firebird III had a two-cylinder auxiliary power unit for accessories and a special grade retarder to simulate engine braking, which Jan Norbye criticized as resulting from "the refusal of the turbine experts to tackle the problems at the base ... these two systems seem of dubious value except in an application where cost is no object".

The engine was redesignated GMT-305 in 1959 and further development for regular production was handed off from GM Research to Allison Transmission. As the GMT-305, it incorporated approximately 30 lb (14 kg) of nickel in alloys, including the turbine blades (GMR-235), turbine wheels (16-25-6), turboshafts (4340), turbine bolts (Inconel X), turbine and bulkhead casings (SAE 60347), and combustion chambers (Hastelloy X). The first GMT-305 prototypes began shipping in November 1959 for fitment to U.S. military vehicles, including the M56 Scorpion and a 28-foot personnel boat. The Whirlfire-powered M56 underwent winter conditions testing and accumulated 1,000 mi (1,600 km) of service with little trouble. In addition, the GMT-305 was fitted to an ore-hauling truck at an open-pit nickel mine in Sudbury, Ontario.

=== GT-309 ===
GT-307, a proposed successor to GT-305, was designed in 1960 but never built. Instead, GM moved away from passenger cars with GT-309 (1964), which was designed for heavy-duty applications, as demonstrated by its use in the Chevrolet Turbo Titan III truck and Turbo-Cruiser II/III buses; for this updated engine, the gasifier turbine and compressor were designed to operate at 35,700 RPM, generating 280 hp (210 kW) at a power shaft speed of 35,000 RPM (with reduction gearing, 4,000 RPM). Stall torque was 875 lb⋅ft (1,186 N⋅m) at idle. In addition, the GT-309 was fitted to a conventional GMC Astro-95 cabover tractor and the RTX transit bus prototype of 1969.

Compared to earlier engines, the turbine inlet temperature was increased again to 1,700 °F (930 °C). The gasifier (compressor) shaft idled at 15,000 RPM and BSFC was 0.45 lb/hp·h. A "power transfer" system was used to harness some of the gasifier turbine to the output shaft; with this engaged, engine braking was available at an effectiveness of two to three times the equivalent effect as using a piston engine. The engine used a single rotating drum regenerator, moved to the top of the engine with a single combustor. With this reconfiguration, GT-309 measured 36 in (910 mm) long, 30 in (760 mm) wide, and 35.5 in (900 mm) high, consuming air at a rate of 4 lb/s (110 kg/min) with a compression ratio of 3.9:1. Whenever the transmission was in gear, the engine operated at a ready-idle speed of 19,300 RPM (gasifier turboshaft) and was capable of accelerating to 32,130 RPM in 2.7 seconds to combat throttle lag. The single regenerator preheated the compressed air from 400 to 1,100 °F (204 to 593 °C), resulting in exhaust gas temperatures of less than 500 °F (260 °C).

Unlike the GT-305, commercial development of the GT-309 was handled by Detroit Diesel instead. However, Detroit Diesel and Allison were merged in 1970, resulting in the Detroit Diesel Allison Division of General Motors Corporation (DDAD), reuniting road vehicle gas turbine development in GM.

=== GT-404/505/606 ===
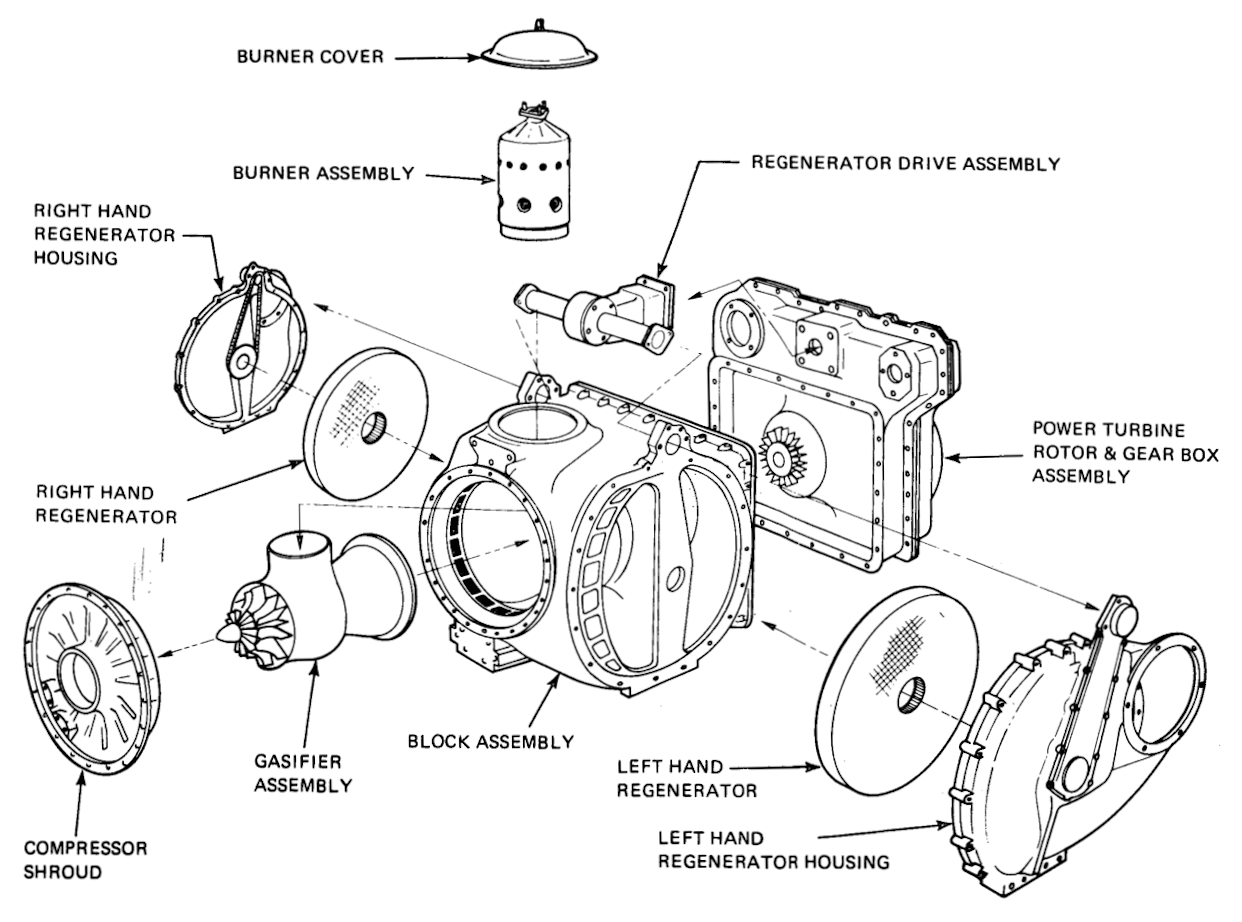
GT-404, exploded view

The final evolution of the GM gas turbine engine was the GT-404, which was developed by DDAD and had dropped the Whirlfire branding. GT-404 output was 325 hp (242 kW) at gasifier / power turbine speeds of 37,103 / 30,830 RPM, with a stall torque of 595 lb⋅ft (807 N⋅m) and BSFC of 0.475 lb/hp·h. Compared to the preceding GT-309, the 404 returned to dual side-mounted regenerators, although the 404 used discs rather than drums. The 404 was considerably larger and heavier than the preceding 309, at 47 in × 28 in × 39 in (1,190 mm × 710 mm × 990 mm) (W×L×H) and 1,700 lb (770 kg). A special version of the Allison Transmission HT-740 heavy-duty automatic transmission was planned to be mated with the GT-404, which omitted the torque converter and saved some space.

The first GT-404 engines were shipped from the Detroit Diesel Allison plant in Indianapolis to Detroit and Portland, Oregon in 1971, for installation in prototype over-the-road tractors. In addition, it served in the electrical power generator set for the MIM-104 Patriot surface-to-air missile fire unit. The list price of the first versions, at US$9,000 (equivalent to $50,000 in 2024), reportedly was "barely adequate to cover production costs" and not competitive with conventional diesel engines. Serial production was scheduled to begin in 1972, and GT-505 and 606 variants were planned to follow in 1973, with increased outputs of 400–450 hp (300–340 kW) (505) and 550 hp (410 kW) (606). Limited field experience with the 404 was obtained between 1974 and 1977, including use in MC-7 Super 7 Turbocruiser buses for Greyhound. Later versions of the 404 used advanced materials, including aluminum silicate ceramic disc regenerators.

The GM RTS-3T candidate prototype (1972) tested under the Transbus Program also used a GT-404. In the late 1970s, the U.S. Departments of Energy and Transportation jointly conducted the Gas Turbine Transit Bus Demonstration Program, using the DDA GT-404 gas turbine in both transit buses and highway coaches. 11 GT-404-4 engines were built for this program; this version was rated at a nominal 300 hp (220 kW) output with a turbine inlet temperature of 1,875 °F (1,024 °C); as-shipped, tested engine output varied from 282.8 to 304.3 hp (210.9 to 226.9 kW), with BSFC between 0.428 and 0.447 lb/hp·h. Under the demonstration program, four GT-404-powered RTS-II (T8H-603) transit buses and four MCI MC-8 Americruiser coaches were placed into revenue service for the MTA (in Baltimore, Maryland) and Greyhound Lines, respectively. The MTA terminated its test in July 1981 after three months in revenue service; by the time the study concluded in 1983, it had been placed under the auspices of NASA.

Because GM declined to convert the RTS-II buses to accommodate the turbine engines, a fabricator was contracted to custom install them; the GT-404-4 engines were hand-built at a per-unit cost of US$250,000 (equivalent to $1,210,000 in 2024). Externally, the modified RTS-II turbine buses for MTA required a boxy cover at back of the bus to accommodate the relocated air conditioning condenser, changing the profile from a slanted rear end to a boxier look. The turbine engines were installed in Greyhound MC-8 fleet numbers 5991 (engine T6), 5992 (T5, later T8), 5993 (T7), and 5994 (T5, later T9); and MTA RTS-II fleet numbers 3318 (T11), 3319 (T11, later T14), 3320 (T14, later T13), and 3321 (T13, later T15 & T12). Engine T10 was cannibalized for parts before being installed into a bus. Over 170,610 mi (274,570 km) of service with Greyhound, the four MC-8 buses averaged 4.26 mpg_{‑US} (55.2 L/100 km), less efficient than diesel piston-engined peer coaches, which achieved 5.66 mpg_{‑US} (41.6 L/100 km) on average. Similarly, over 19,660 mi (31,640 km) of revenue service with MTA, the four RTS-II buses averaged 2.7 mpg_{‑US} (87 L/100 km), consuming more than peer transit buses, which averaged 4.3 mpg_{‑US} (55 L/100 km) on similar routes.

== See also ==
- Chrysler turbine engines, prototype contemporaneous engines with comparable levels of development
