= Allison V730 =

The Allison V730 is a three-speed automatic transmission used in several makes of transit bus including the RTS, Canadian-produced Classic buses derived from the GM New Look, and Grumman Flxibles. Later production buses in the GM and Flxible line had the Allison V731 transmission, which is essentially the same unit but controlled electronically, with a keypad replacing the familiar shifter-lever in the driver's compartment.

The Allison V730/V731 family transmissions moreover come in versions with a built-in retarder (the VR731), and a version allowing transit agencies and others to use right-turning Detroit Diesel family motors (variously the V731R or V731RH) instead of the standard left-turning units found in Flxibles, GM New Looks and RTS equipment.

Most installations of the V730/V731 have them coupled to the DDA 6V92TA two-stroke diesel engine, with the exception of GM 'Classic' T6H-5307 buses produced in Canada, where these were instead mated to the then-standard 6V71N engine. Some Canadian production 1982 "New Look" models featured the 6V92 mated to the V730, such as Vancouver, B.C.'s 1982 T6H-5307 "Hillclimber" buses. An example resides at "TRAMS" in British Columbia.
