= New York Bus Service =

Defunct bus company in New York City

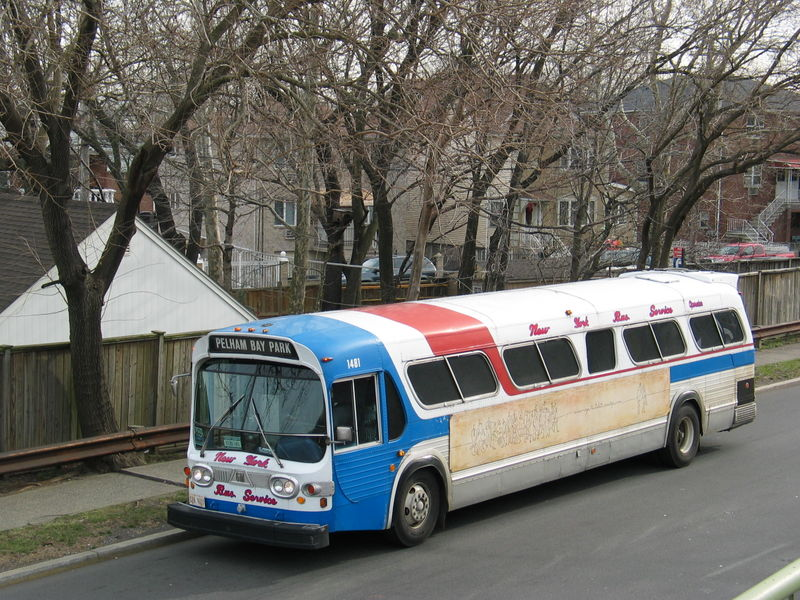
- A former GM Fishbowl bus built in 1982.
- Founded: 1944 or 1945
- Defunct: 2005
- Headquarters: Tillotson Avenue near Conner Street; Eastchester, Bronx, NY, 10475-1398
- Service area: Bronx, Manhattan, Queens

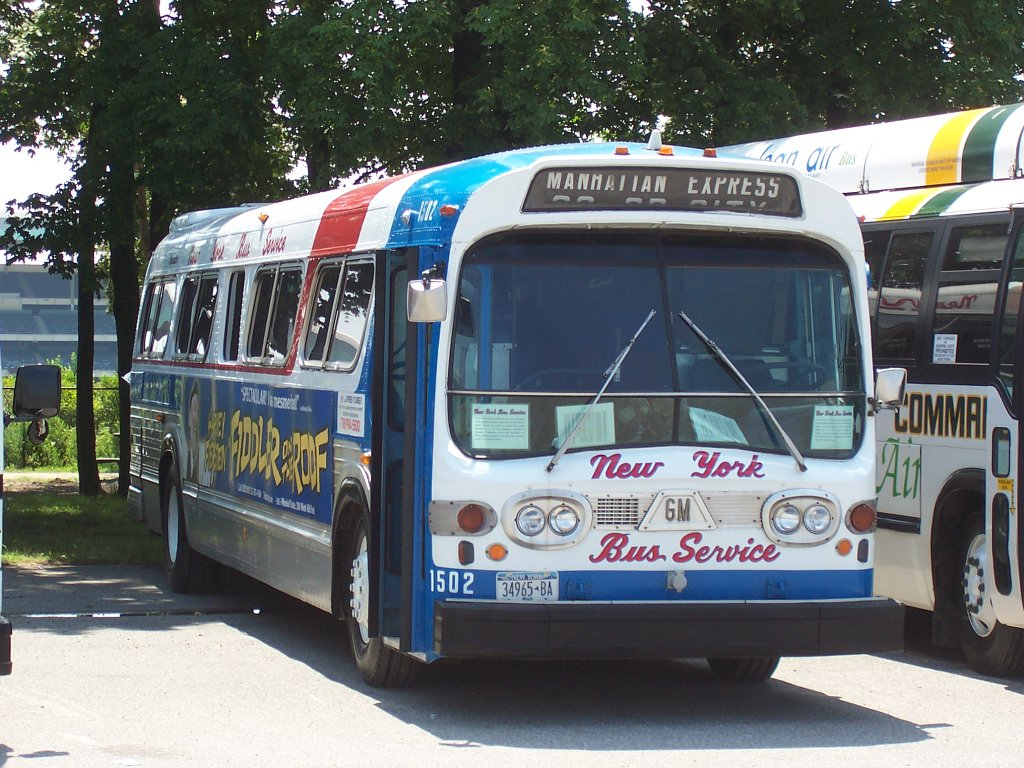
- #1502, now in the museum fleet of the MTA

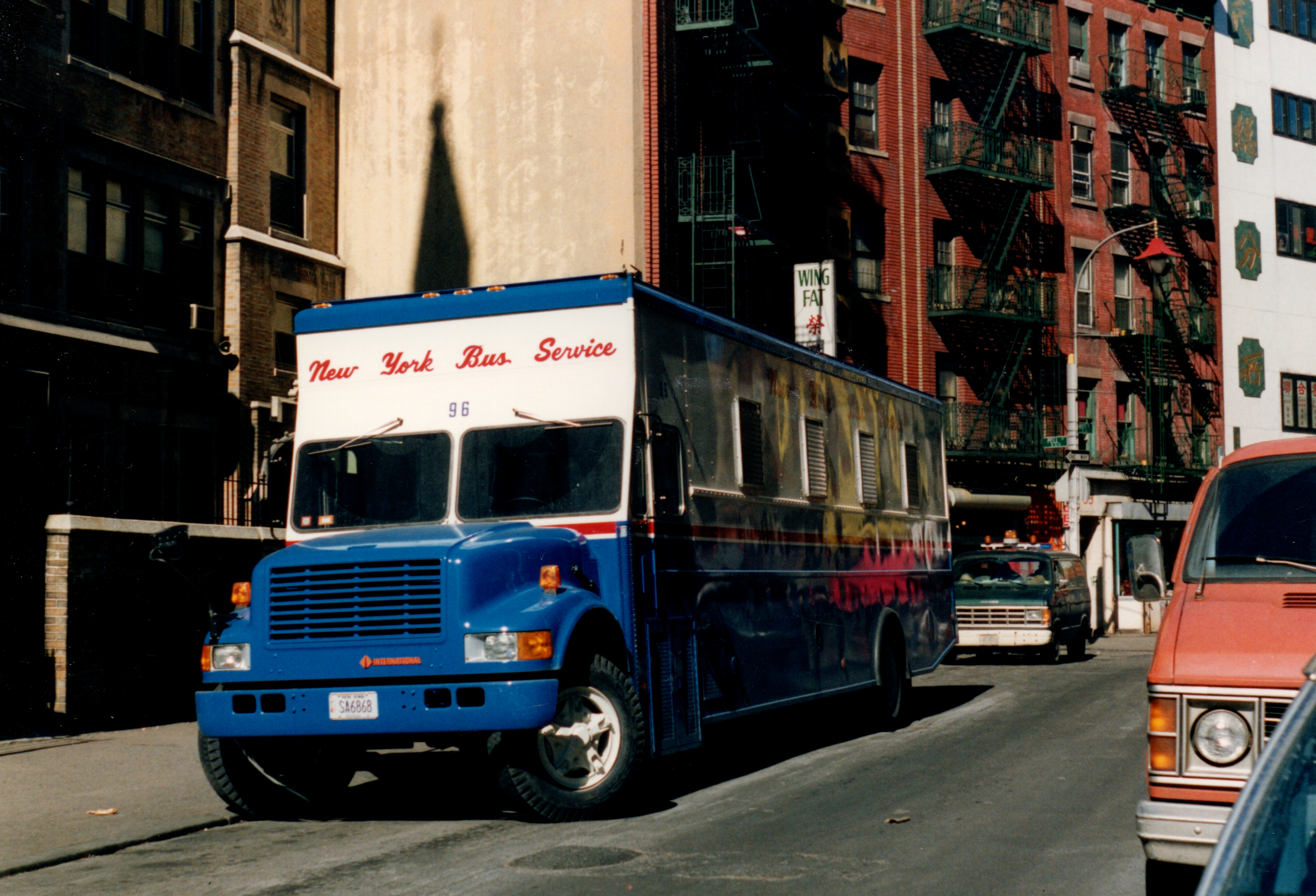
A mobile classroom in lower Manhattan in February 1990

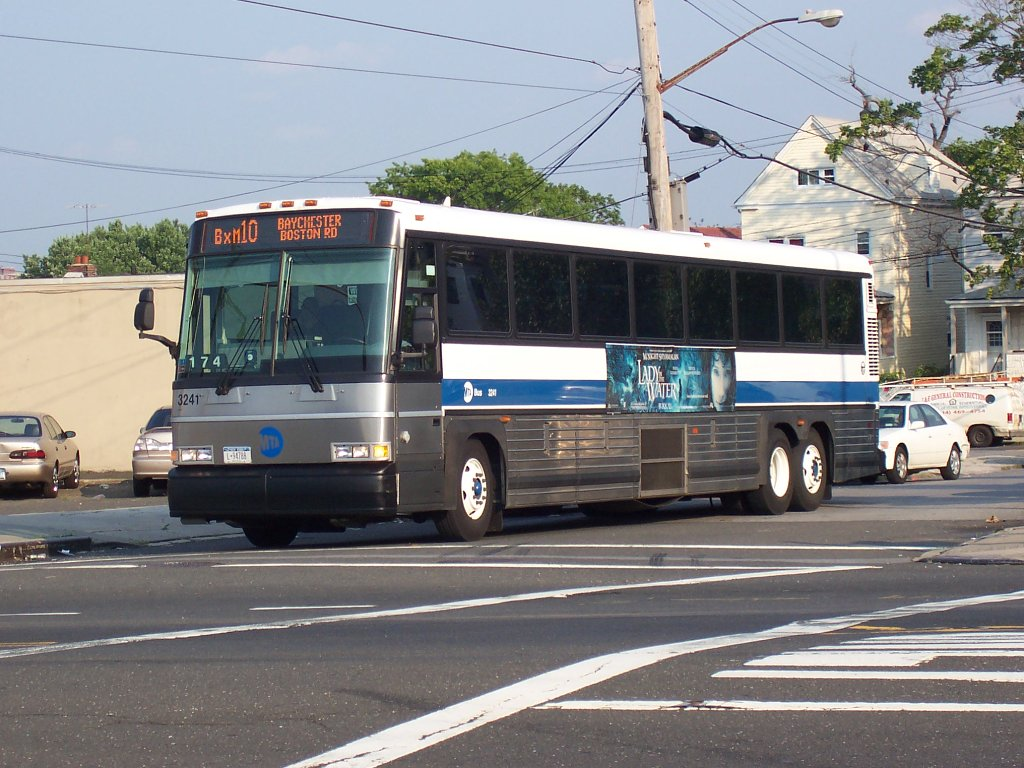
An MCI D4500CL on the Bxm10

New York Bus Service was a private bus company in New York City. Originally a school bus company founded in the mid-1940s, it was known for providing express bus service between Midtown Manhattan and eastern sections of the Bronx from 1970 until July 1, 2005, when the city (MTA) assumed the company's operations from longtime owner Edward Arrigoni. Former NYBS routes operate under the MTA Bus Company brand of the Metropolitan Transportation Authority, out of the former NYBS facility in Eastchester, Bronx.

== History ==
The company began as the "station wagons-for-hire" business of Ferdinand E. Arrigoni. It was officially founded in either 1944 or 1945 under the name Parochial Bus Service to provide school bus service. It began operating racetrack]services from the Bronx and Upper Manhattan in 1949, then operating as New York Bus Tours. In 1964, contemporary owner Edward F. Arrigoni took over the company after the death of his father. The company later operated service to the 1964 New York World's Fair (under the subsidiary Ferdinand Arrigoni, Inc.) and to New York Mets games at Shea Stadium beginning in 1966, both from the George Washington Bridge Bus Station in Washington Heights, Manhattan. The Shea Stadium service would also operate from Fordham Plaza, Parkchester, and several other locations in the Bronx. By 1968, the company began operating under the name New York Bus Service.

With the institution of off-track betting legislation in 1970, the demand for transportation to the race track diminished. NYBS needed to find another niche in the bus transportation sector. Under the leadership of Arrigoni, NYBS commenced Parkchester - Manhattan express bus service (now the BxM6) on August 24, 1970. Six more lines were added including a Co-Op City to Wall Street express bus service, later to be done away with. These express bus routes would run frequently during AM and PM peak periods.

== City takeover and current status ==
As part of a major takeover of the remaining private bus operators, on March 23, 2005, New York City announced it had agreed to take over NYBS operations. The city made an initial buyout payment of two million dollars for rights to the Bronx express bus lines NYBS operated. The MTA Bus Company (the successor to the private line operations) meanwhile agreed to pay Arrigoni and the other NYBS owners six million dollars annually for use of its depot and maintenance facilities for a period of twenty years, with an option to purchase afterwards. On July 1, 2005, NYBS ceased operations and the former bus routes began operating under MTA Bus. The MTA has since renamed the garage to Eastchester Depot. The large facility provides heavy maintenance services, along with a body shop for collision rebuilding and repairs for many MTA, and NYCT buses, stores "system reserve" buses, and handles much of the scrapping duties, including usable parts removal with components salvage and removal operations from all retired buses. MCI D4500 2926 was donated to the Friends of the New Jersey Transportation Heritage Center in 2021, renumbered 1803 and was given a New York Bus Service livery.

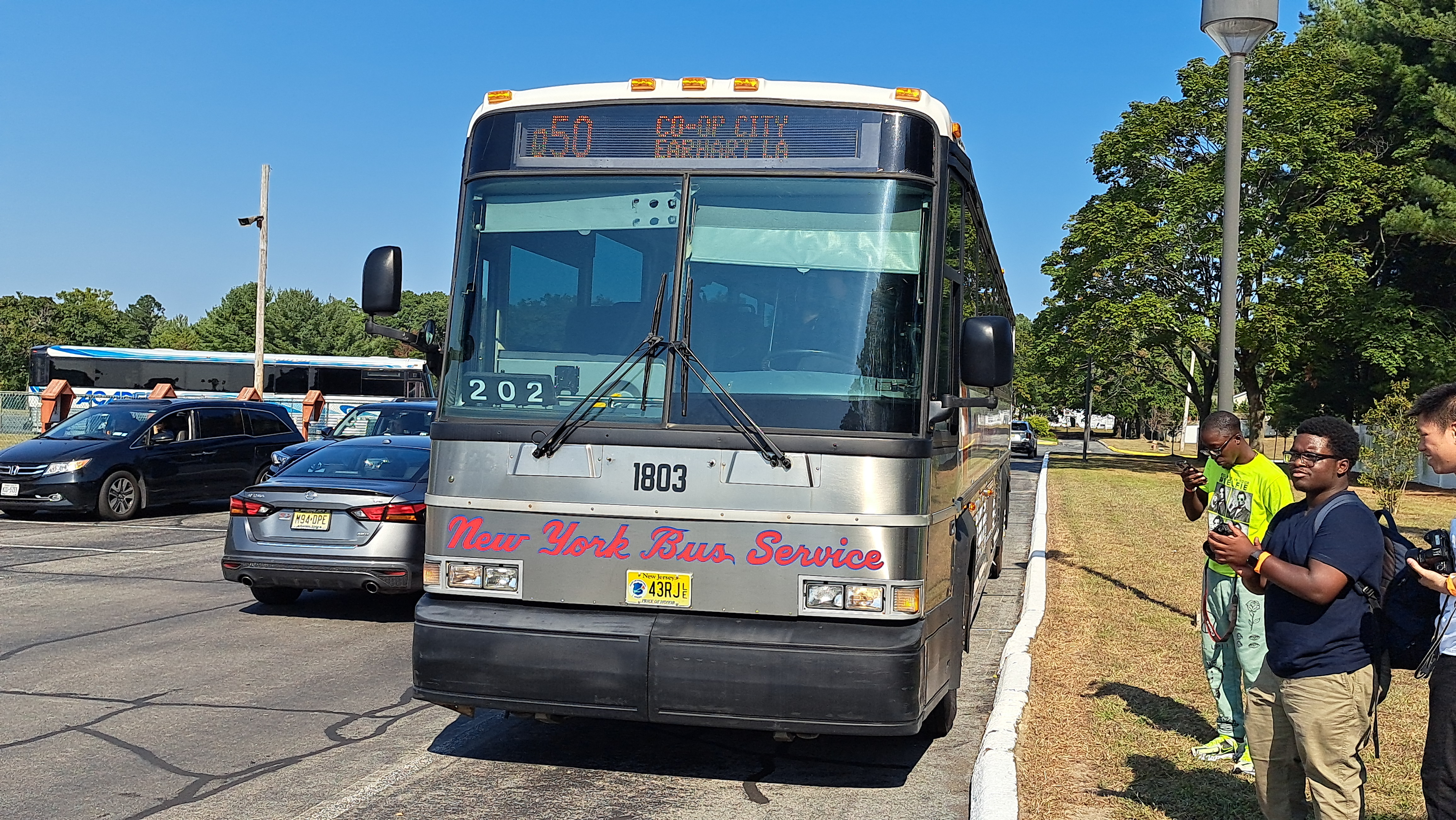
#1803 in September 2024, signed as a Co-Op City-bound Q50

== Bus routes ==
Prior to the MTA Bus takeover, NYBS operated the following express bus routes with starting dates:

| Route (Name) | Terminal A | Major streets of travel | Terminal B | Notes |
Bronx-Manhattan Express
| BxM-6 (Parkchester; Express) | Midtown Manhattan; East 23rd Street and Madison Avenue | Manhattan: 5th Avenue (southbound), 3rd and Madison Avenues (northbound), 72nd Street (eastbound); Bronx: East 177th Street, Metropolitan Avenue | Parkchester; Metropolitan Oval | Established; August 24, 1970 |
| BxM-7 (Co-Op City; Express) | Midtown Manhattan; East 23rd Street and Madison Avenue | Manhattan: 5th Avenue (southbound), 3rd and Madison Avenues (northbound), 72nd Street (eastbound); Bronx: Hutchinson River Parkway East, Co-Op City Boulevard | Co-op City; Dreiser Loop | Established January 18, 1971 |
| BxM-7A(Pelham Bay; Express) | Midtown Manhattan; East 23rd Street and Madison Avenue | Manhattan: 5th Avenue (southbound), 3rd and Madison Avenues (northbound), 72nd Street (eastbound); Bronx: Westchester Avenue, Bruckner Boulevard | Pelham Bay; Pelham Bay Park subway station ( 6 <6> trains) | Established; January 10, 1972; Now BxM-8 |
| BxM-7B (City Island; Express) | Midtown Manhattan; East 23rd Street and Madison Avenue | Manhattan: 5th Avenue (southbound), 3rd and Madison Avenues (northbound), 72nd Street (eastbound); Bronx: Westchester Avenue, Bruckner Boulevard | City Island; City Island Avenue and Rochelle Street | Established; January 7, 1980.; Eliminated by the MTA on June 27, 2010, due to budget cuts.; Replaced by two extended BxM8 trips. |
| BxM-9 (Throggs Neck; Express) | Midtown Manhattan; East 23rd Street and Madison Avenue | Manhattan: 5th Avenue (southbound), 3rd and Madison Avenues (northbound), 72nd Street (eastbound); Bronx: Randall Avenue, Harding Avenue, Throgs Neck Boulevard (outbound), Clarence Avenue (inbound) | Throggs Neck; Layton Avenue and Ellsworth Avenue | Established; August 2, 1976 |
| BxM-10 (Morris Park; Express) | Midtown Manhattan; East 23rd Street and Madison Avenue | Manhattan: 5th Avenue (southbound), 3rd and Madison Avenues (northbound), 72nd Street (eastbound); Bronx: Morris Park Avenue, Eastchester Road | Morris Park Morris Park Avenue & East 180th Street East 180th Street subway station ( 2 5 trains); or: Baychester Eastchester Road and Boston Road | Established; January 7, 1980; Currently the northern terminus is recognized as being in Williamsbridge |
Bronx Local Buses (1968–1972)
| Bx70 | Co-op City | | Eastchester; Dyre Avenue subway station ( 5 train) | Discontinued in 1972 due to low ridership. |
| Bx71 | Co-op City | Baychester Avenue | Wakefield; Wakefield-241st Street subway station ( 2 train) | Discontinued in 1972 due to low ridership. |
