= Chevrolet Turbo Titan III =

Turbo Titan III

Overview
- Manufacturer: Chevrolet
- Production: 1965

Body and chassis
- Layout: FR
- Platform: Chevrolet tilt-cab

Powertrain
- Engine: GT-309 regenerative gas turbine
- Transmission: Allison MT-40, 6-spd auto

Dimensions
- Wheelbase: 3,099 mm (122 in)
- Length: 6,350 mm (250 in)
- Width: 2,438 mm (96 in)
- Height: 2,540 mm (100 in)

Chronology
- Predecessor: Turbo Titan I/II

The Chevrolet Turbo Titan III was a gas turbine-powered concept cabover heavy truck designed and built as a working prototype by General Motors in 1965. It was accompanied by a matching custom trailer built in stainless steel; the Turbo Titan III was first shown to the public during the 1965 season of the 1964 New York World's Fair.

== History ==
GM designed and built prototype trucks in the 1950s using the same gas turbine engines as the ones used in its Firebird concept sports cars, including the Turbo Titan I (GT-304 turbine, also fitted to Firebird II) and II (GT-305, Firebird III).

Rival Ford had built a similar turbine-powered Big Red concept truck, first shown at the 1964 New York World's Fair. The dual-turbine GM Bison was also exhibited at the 1964 World's Fair; under most operating conditions, the Bison would drive on its GT-309 turbine engine, using the auxiliary 700 hp (520 kW) turbine as needed for loads, grades, or acceleration.

Reportedly, the Turbo Titan III prototype was destroyed in the late 1960s.

== Design ==
The Turbo Titan III was built around the General Motors GT-309 gas turbine engine and featured streamlined Space Age-styling.

=== Styling ===
The cab was built using fiberglass and steel, with prominent air intakes for the GT-309 engine on either side of the front fascia. At the time, the head of design for General Motors was Bill Mitchell. The chassis was a conventional Chevrolet tilt-cab cab-over-engine, first marketed in 1960. Both the headlight units and front turn signals retracted into the body when not in use. The interior featured aircraft-like gauges and a "twin dial" steering unit.

=== GT-309 gas turbine ===
The GT-309 was derived from earlier GM gas turbine engines developed for the Firebird concept cars of the 1950s. For the GT-309, the turbine and compressor were designed to operate at 35,700 RPM, with reduction gearing used for the upper output shaft, generating 280 hp (210 kW) at a shaft speed of 4,000 RPM. Stall torque was 875 lb⋅ft (1,186 N⋅m) at idle. The GT-309 has a free-turbine turboshaft design in which the output shaft is not mechanically coupled to the compressor shaft, but to maintain a nearly-constant operating temperature and provide for engine braking, the engine was fitted with a variable clutch that coupled the gasifier (compressor turbine rotor) with the output shaft; this system was developed jointly with Allison Transmission and branded "Power Transfer". Raw exhaust gas temperature was 1,700 °F (930 °C) at the gasifier inlet, but a regenerator was used to muffle noise and recover heat energy by preheating inlet air, resulting in tailpipe exhaust temperatures of 300 to 500 °F (149 to 260 °C). Compared to a diesel engine of similar output, the GT-309 was more compact and was only 1/3 of the weight.

The GT-309 was also fitted to GM New Look bus prototypes, as the Turbo-Cruiser II and III, and other bus prototypes including the RTX and later RTS-3T that competed in the Transbus Program.

== See also ==
- Ford Big Red
