= Transbus Program =

Plan to improve US transit bus design

Transbus

Overview
- Manufacturer: AM General; Flxible/Rohr; General Motors

Body and chassis
- Class: Transit bus

Dimensions
- Length: 41 ft (12 m) (over bumpers)
- Width: 102 in (2,600 mm)
- Height: 114 in (2,900 mm) (with A/C)
- Curb weight: 27,500 to 28,500 lb (12,500 to 12,900 kg) (est.)

Chronology
- Predecessor: Flxible New Look bus; GM New Look bus
- Successor: Rapid Transit Series; Flxible Metro

Transbus was announced in December 1970 as a United States Urban Mass Transportation Administration (UMTA) program to develop improvements to existing transit bus design; at the time, the US bus market was dominated by the GM New Look and Flxible New Look buses, and bus ridership was declining. The improvements had been suggested earlier by the National Academy of Sciences in 1968 to improve operating costs, reduce pollution, and stimulate ridership, and included innovations such as a low floor for easier entry and seats cantilevered from the wall to expand passenger space.

In 1971, Booz-Allen Applied Research won the contract to serve as the Systems Manager for the Transbus program. Three manufacturers (Note: AM General, General Motors, and Rohr/Flxible) were selected to participate in the Transbus program in 1972 and each produced prototypes for evaluation by late 1974; some were tested at a proving ground, (Note: The Dynamic Systems, Inc. proving grounds near Phoenix, Arizona) others were subjected to crash testing, and the rest were placed into revenue service during a nationwide tour of four cities (Note: From October 1974 to March 1975, three Transbus prototypes (one from each manufacturer) were tested in Miami, New York, Kansas City, and Seattle.) in 1974 and 1975 to gather rider feedback, which was subsequently incorporated into a specification developed between 1976 and 1978. However, none of the three prototype manufacturers submitted a bid in response to a joint procurement of 530 buses (Note: The request for bid was issued jointly by SCRTD, Metrobus, and SEPTA, the transit agencies serving Los Angeles, Miami, and Philadelphia, respectively. The three-agency consortium had been formed in October 1977 at an American Public Transit Association meeting, and were privately told there by UMTA representatives that an order of at least 500 Transbuses would "put us over the hill in moving the Transbus program forward." The final bid request was for 230 (Los Angeles), 110 (Miami), and 190 (Philadelphia) Transbuses.) to the Transbus specification in 1979. Although no Transbuses were ever ordered, some of the program's goals were incorporated into the successor Advanced Design Buses introduced in the mid-1970s.

== History ==
The Transbus program had five major goals; ancillary goals to achieve the first five were added in 1977:

1. Increase bus ridership
2. Improve safety
3. Improve environmental adaptability
4. Improve maintenance and service
5. Reduce barriers to the elderly, handicapped, and young
6. Improve aesthetics (exterior & interior)
7. Improve performance

=== Early development ===
The interest in newer transit buses was sparked in part by laws passed in the late 1960s and early 1970s granting federal subsidies for public transportation equipment, including buses. General Motors (GM) began developing a replacement for its ubiquitous New Look bus in 1964, demonstrating a three-axle, turbine-powered (Note: The RTX used the same GT-309 gas turbine engine previously developed and installed in the 1966 prototype Chevrolet Turbo Titan III truck.) prototype named Rapid Transit eXperimental (RTX) in 1968. That same year, the National Academy of Sciences (NAS) published a report providing recommendations for buses that would reduce costs and improve ridership. Although RTX would have met many of the objectives from the 1968 NAS report, testing and evaluation showed several issues: the lowered floor of the RTX, at 22 in (560 mm), meant novel chassis, suspension, and brake components were needed, adding to the complexity, weight, and cost of the RTX design.

GM wrote a letter to United States Department of Transportation Secretary John Volpe in 1971, complaining that it had begun work on the RTX-derived Rapid Transit Series (RTS) to meet the goals of the 1968 NAS report, but could not start serial production until UMTA changed its low-bid policy to allow federal subsidies for the RTS. At the time, the three major U.S. transit bus manufacturers offered 'New Look' style buses that were functionally equivalent, (Note: These were the GM New Look, Flxible New Look, and AM General Metropolitan.) and to qualify for federal subsidies, the transit agency was required to award its bus procurement contracts to the lowest bidder. GM later reversed its stance and announced in May 1973 it would begin producing the RTS. The first RTS prototype was produced in 1974, followed by the 1975 RTS-II prototype, which was evaluated in demonstration service by several transit agencies.

The Transbus program was intended to design a standardized transit bus, which had the goals of reducing purchase, operating, and maintenance costs, similar to how the Presidents' Conference Committee had designed the PCC streetcar in the 1930s. Transbus was meant to design a successor to the de facto New Look standard, running in parallel with the contemporaneous 1970s effort that designed the US Standard Light Rail Vehicle as the PCC's successor. Transbus development would begin with the production and evaluation of candidate prototype designs from separate manufacturers.

=== Prototype testing ===
Transbus candidate prototypes

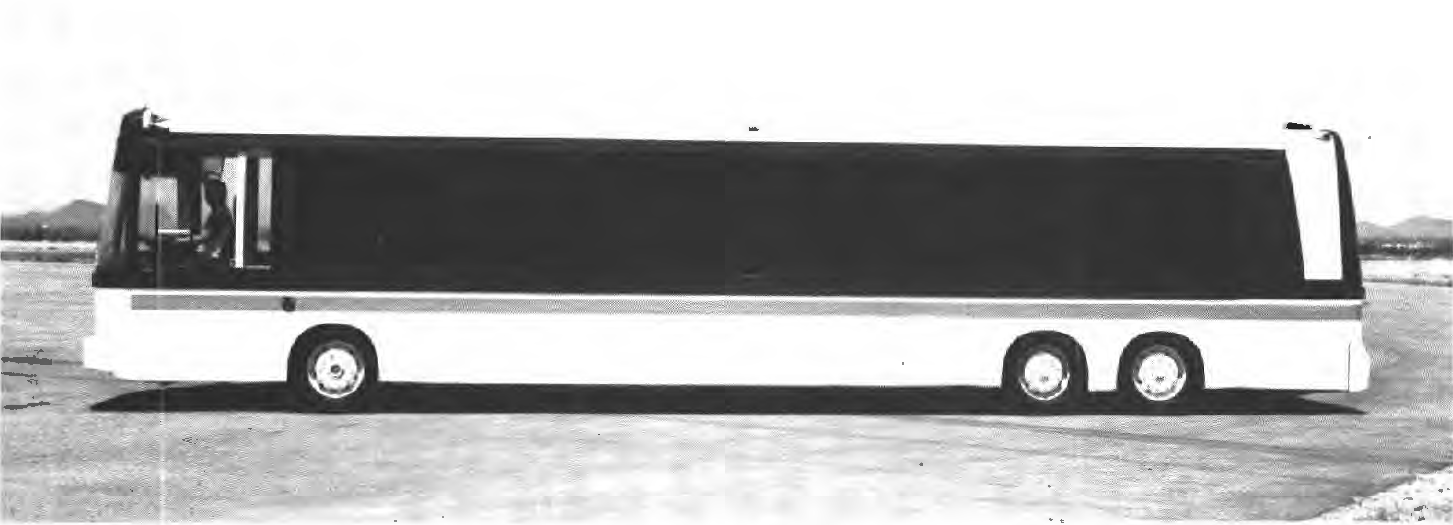
AM General

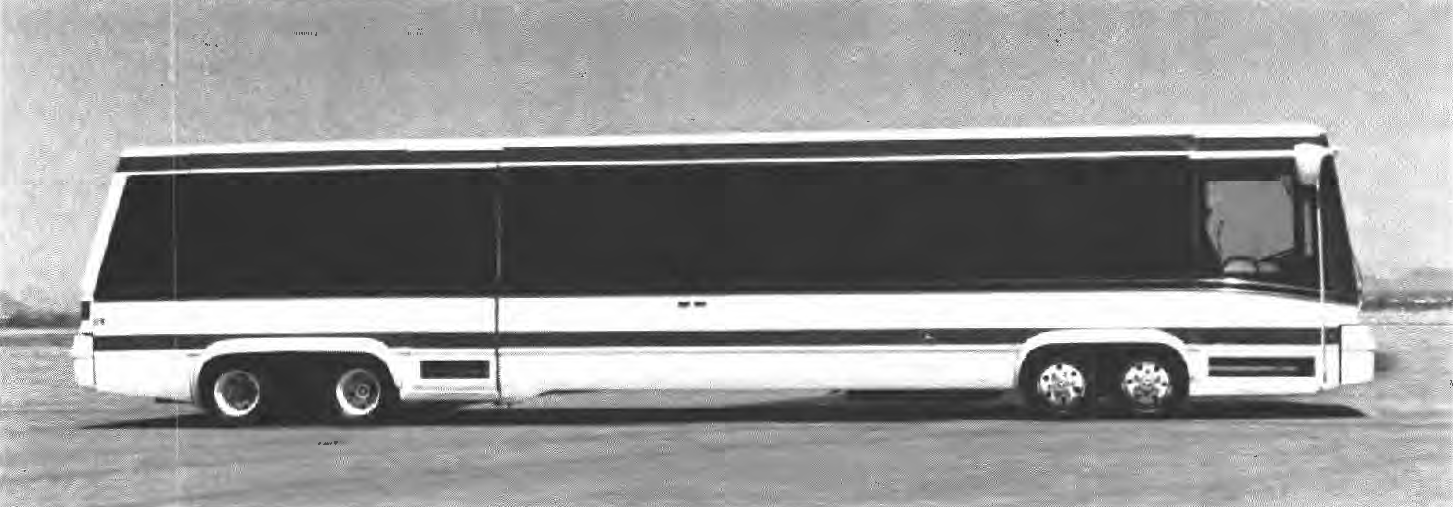
Flxible/Rohr

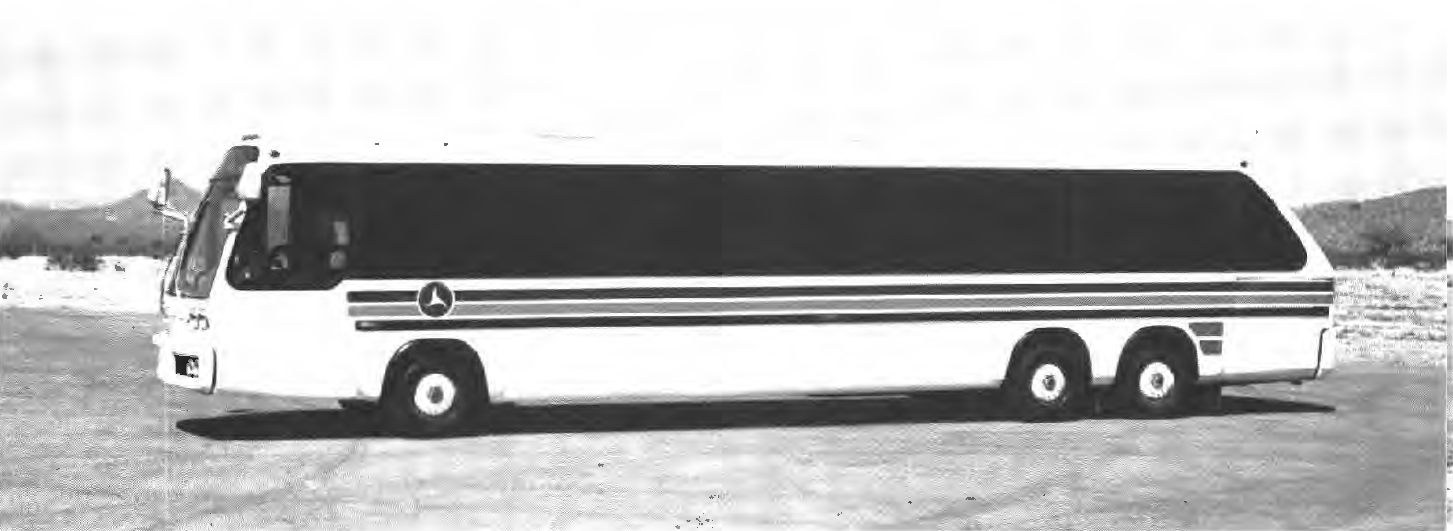
General Motors

Photographed during testing in Arizona.

The initial prototyping contracts were awarded to AM General, General Motors, and Rohr's Flxible division in 1972 to build nine Transbus candidate prototypes (three from each manufacturer) for further testing and evaluation at a total cost of US$28,000,000 (equivalent to $210,480,000 in 2024). Booz-Allen would test and evaluate each design, then composite the best ideas from each into a standardized procurement specification. This was to be followed by the procurement of 100 to 600 preproduction Transbuses for further development and testing in revenue service. In March 1973, representatives from UMTA testified before Congress they intended for each manufacturer to produce 100 preproduction prototypes. The American Public Transit Association proposed for each manufacturer to produce 200 preproduction prototypes for evaluation in service, then hold a two-year production moratorium to gather feedback.

Due to the Rehabilitation Act of 1973, which was passed in September 1973, the goals of Transbus shifted to allow full accessibility for public transit vehicles, and the candidate designs were modified to incorporate a ramp or a lift. The nine prototypes were delivered in 1974. Three would be crash tested, three would be tested in Phoenix and Buffalo, and the remaining three would enter demonstration service for evaluation in four cities. On May 13, 1975, one of the Flxible prototypes caught fire during testing in Arizona and was destroyed, but no one was injured; at the time, it was carrying two technicians, instruments, and sandbags to simulate a full passenger load.

In 1975, the UMTA canceled its initial plans to procure the larger fleet of preproduction Transbuses for further testing. This had been intended to mature the technologies required to support the Transbus priority goals, and the cancellation of the preproduction fleet left these technologies underdeveloped. By 1980, of the six prototypes that had been tested, one had been destroyed in a fire, another had been returned to Flxible, and the other four were being stored in Phoenix, Arizona.

=== Shifting requirements ===
In January 1975, UMTA Administrator Frank C. Herringer announced the prototypes would be used to create a composite performance specification for Transbus and that new bus procurements would need to meet the Transbus specification to qualify for federal subsidies; his intent was to quash GM's competing RTS bus design. GM was undeterred and continued development of the RTS, and Herringer soon left UMTA to head the Bay Area Rapid Transit District. One of his successors, Robert E. Patricelli, quietly encouraged GM to continue developing the RTS; by that time, GM already had concluded the Transbus project requirements were impossible to implement. GM made its first sale for the RTS to a consortium of transit agencies in May 1976; GM was the sole bidder for that contract.

Patricelli would go on to effectively kill Transbus by issuing a policy order in July 1976 stating the specified Transbus floor height of 22 in (560 mm) was impractical, adding that Advanced Design Bus (ADB) designs (Note: 'Advanced Design Bus' collectively refers to the General Motors Rapid Transit Series and the Rohr/Flxible 870/Metro designs.) then under development would qualify for federal subsidies. In February 1977, Patricelli made the ADB specification a requirement for buses procured using federal subsidies, shutting out AM General, who had not developed an ADB in parallel with their Transbus prototype, as GM and Flxible had.

Changing requirements for Transbus also led to considerable confusion. The Transbus Procurement Requirement (TPR) specifications were first promulgated in 1976, but amended numerous times, occasionally in conflict with prior versions. For instance, in March 1978, TPR were amended to require a single rear axle, but were subsequently amended that August to require tandem rear axles.

AM General filed a lawsuit against the United States Department of Transportation in 1976 over the "exclusionary" specifications in the GM RTS contract awarded by the consortium, asserting the new ADB specification requirement to qualify for federal subsidies essentially shut them out of the transit bus market altogether; the lawsuit effectively halted all transit bus procurement nationwide. AM General lost their suit in April 1977.

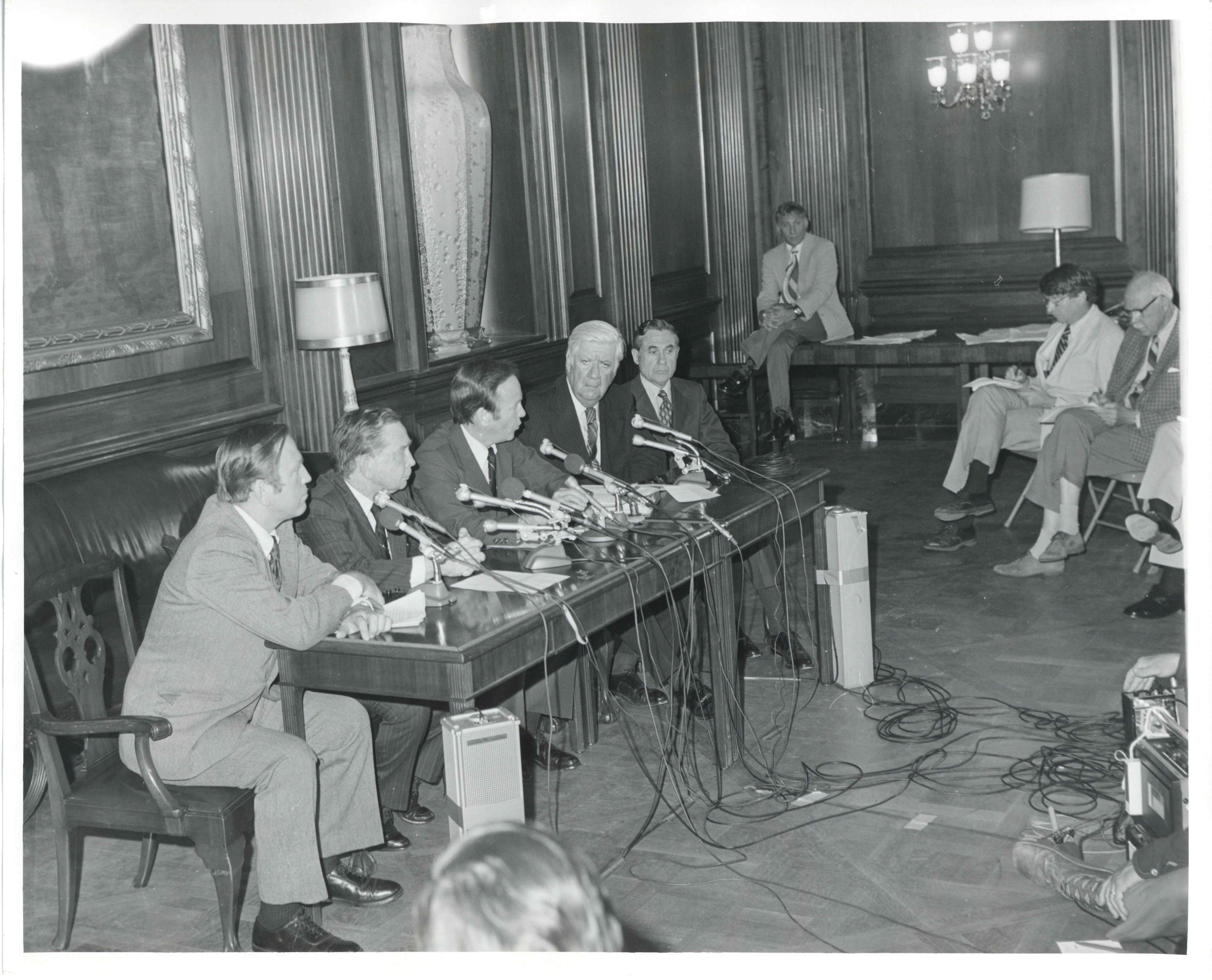
Brock Adams (center), at a press conference while serving as a member of Congress (Sep 1976). Seated, L-R: John Brademas, Carl Albert, Adams, Thomas P. O'Neill, and John J. McFall.

Incoming Secretary of Transportation Brock Adams revived the Transbus project, and in May 1977, stated that by October 1979, new buses would have to meet the Transbus specifications to qualify for federal subsidies. In 1978, the San Francisco Municipal Railway ruled out Transbus for its forthcoming procurement of accessible buses, noting the lowered floor and undercarriage would get caught on the city's hills.

=== Bid failure ===
The Transbus specification requirement led three transit agencies to request bids for a joint procurement of 530 buses in January 1979. It was estimated that a single Transbus would cost 60% more than a comparable New Look bus, driven mainly by the low-floor requirement, which in turn would require significant investments to develop axle, drivetrain, suspension, and tire technologies. In addition, the terms of the 1979 procurement made the bidders responsible for significant risks and performance guarantees.

By March 1979, Grumman Flxible (Note: Grumman acquired Flxible from Rohr on January 3, 1978 for US$55,000,000 (equivalent to $265,150,000 in 2024). The acquisition included two hand-built prototypes of and the design for the Model 870.) announced it did not intend to bid on the new contract, and GM stated it was unlikely to bid. The president of Grumman Flxible, Thomas J. Bernard, said that internal estimates put the bid price at US$230,000 (equivalent to $996,000 in 2024) per bus, nearly double the US$120,000 (equivalent to $520,000 in 2024) cost per conventional New Look bus, and added the Department of Transportation "has been seeking a more productive bus. We believe that a bus that weighs more, gets fewer miles per gallon, has fewer seats and less standing room is not a more productive bus." Flxible also stated that component suppliers (such as Rockwell International, who built transit bus axles) would need federal support to develop the new technologies needed for Transbus, as the limited transit bus market meant most component suppliers were unwilling to develop them.

When the bidding period closed that May, neither GM, Flxible, nor any foreign manufacturers had provided a bid. Secretary Adams said he was "deeply disappointed" that no bids had been received; the companies countered the Transbus design was impossible to implement and their ADB designs already met accessibility requirements. A Congressional hearing was held later in May regarding the failure of the procurement. With the failure of the 1979 procurement, the requirement to procure new, federally subsidized buses to the Transbus specification was suspended in August.

== Legacy ==
Advanced Design Bus

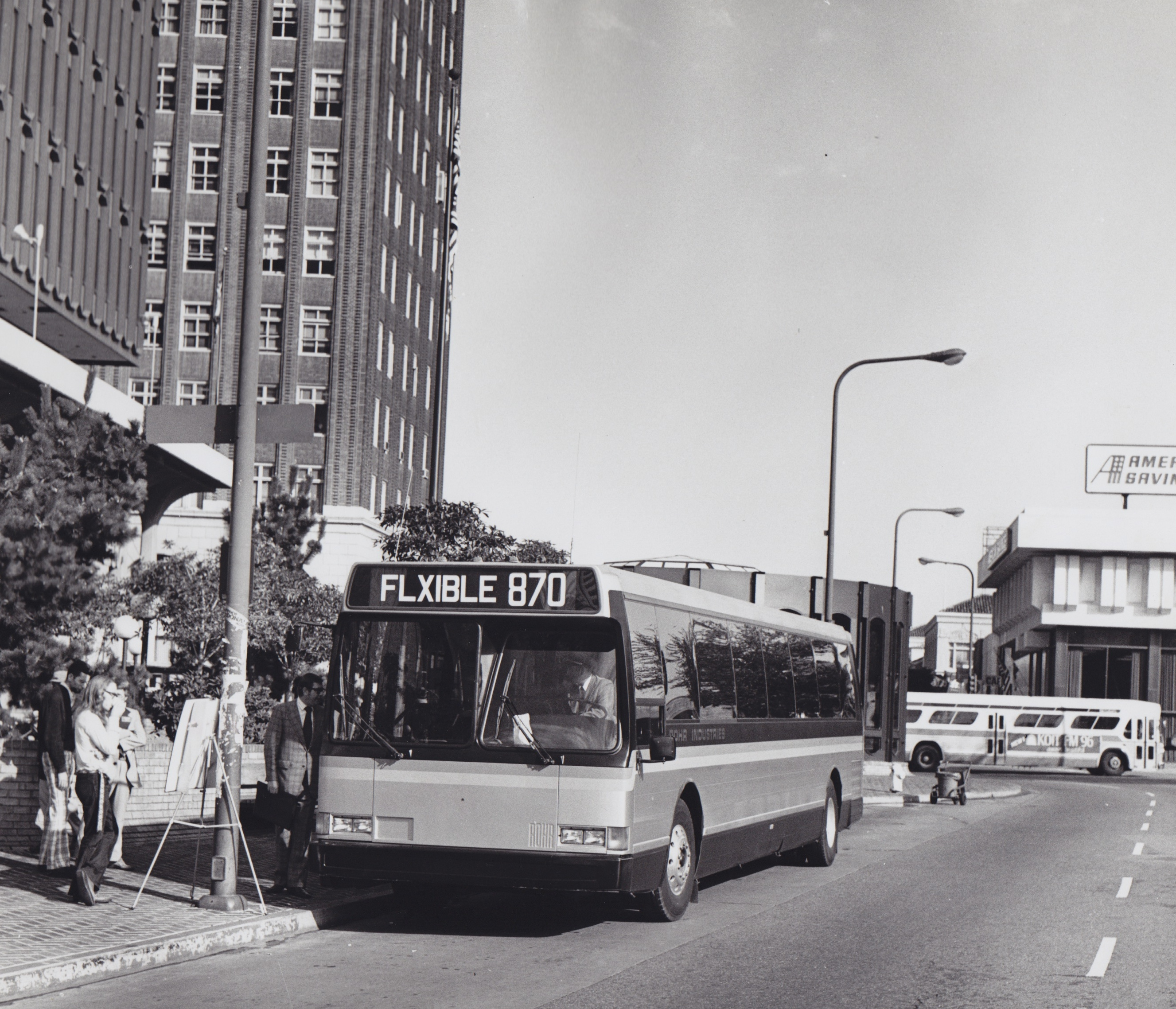
Flxible Metro/870 (1976)

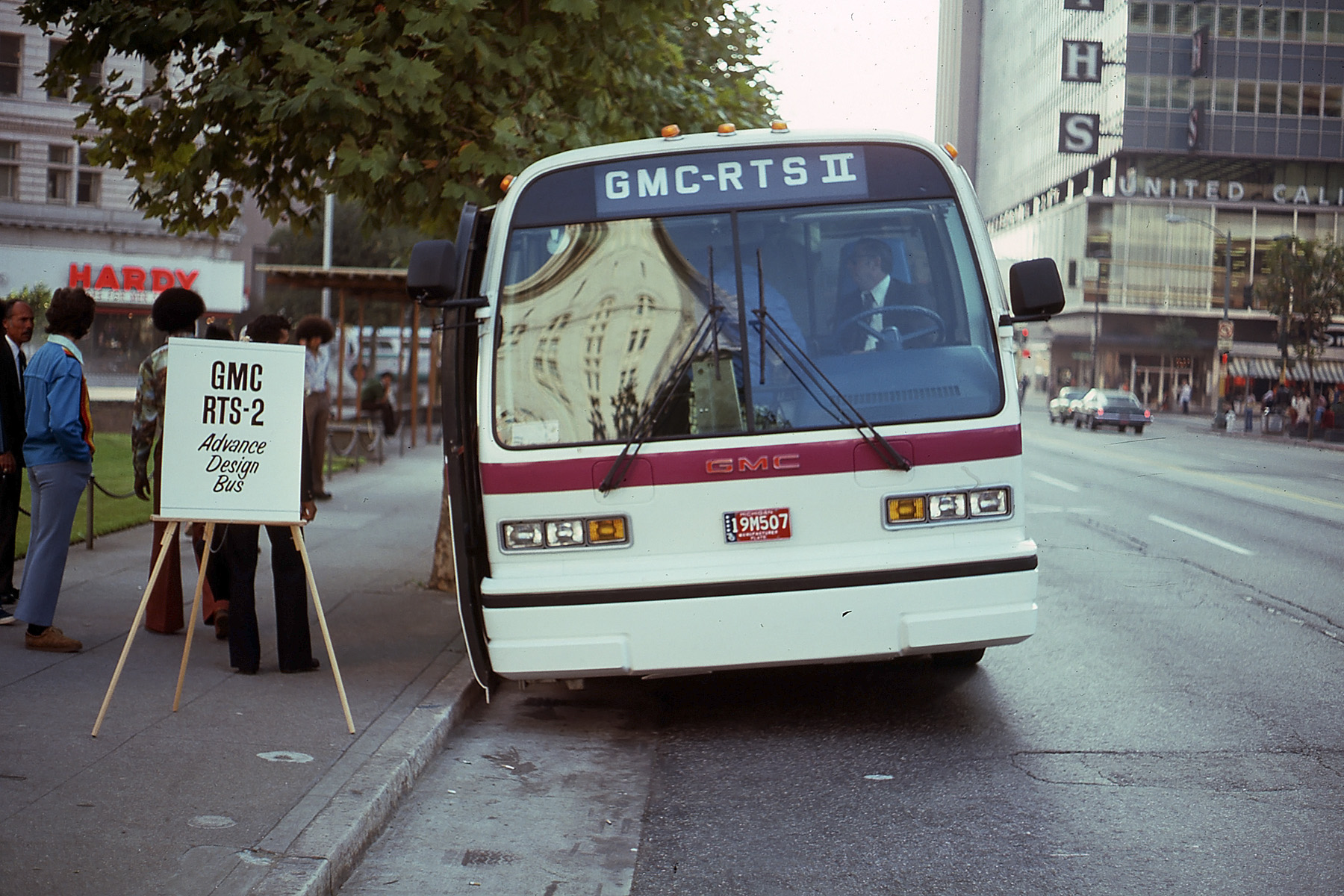
GM RTS-II (1975)

During testing with AC Transit

Transbus is credited with inspiring the simplified ADB specification, changing bus procurement processes, and bringing awareness to the changes that were later made for wheelchair accessibility on transit buses, including the addition of lifts and kneeling bus features.

Each of the three Transbus manufacturers began marketing transit buses in the 1970s, although each of these newer bus designs had a conventional (high) floor and multiple steps in the entryway. AM General began assembling the Metropolitan, a licensed version of the New Look-based Flyer D700, in 1974. The other two bus designs were ADBs, developed independently by GM and Flxible and incorporated some of the Transbus features such as cantilevered seats, smooth exterior construction, and standard air conditioning: GM announced the RTS in 1973 and Rohr/Flxible announced the Metro/870 in 1976.

Prior to the Transbus project, procurement contracts traditionally were awarded to the lowest bidder. After GM and Flxible introduced their ADB designs, UMTA developed a "White Book" model transit bus procurement specification that provided functional targets with price adjustments for features inherent to the ADBs.

All three of the Transbus candidate prototype manufacturers eventually left the transit bus market. After losing their suit, AM General left the transit bus market altogether in June 1978. AM General's exit was preceded by Rohr (who sold Flxible to Grumman in January 1978) and followed by GM (who sold the RTS design and tooling to Greyhound Lines in January 1987).
