= GM New Look bus =

American public transit bus

GM New Look
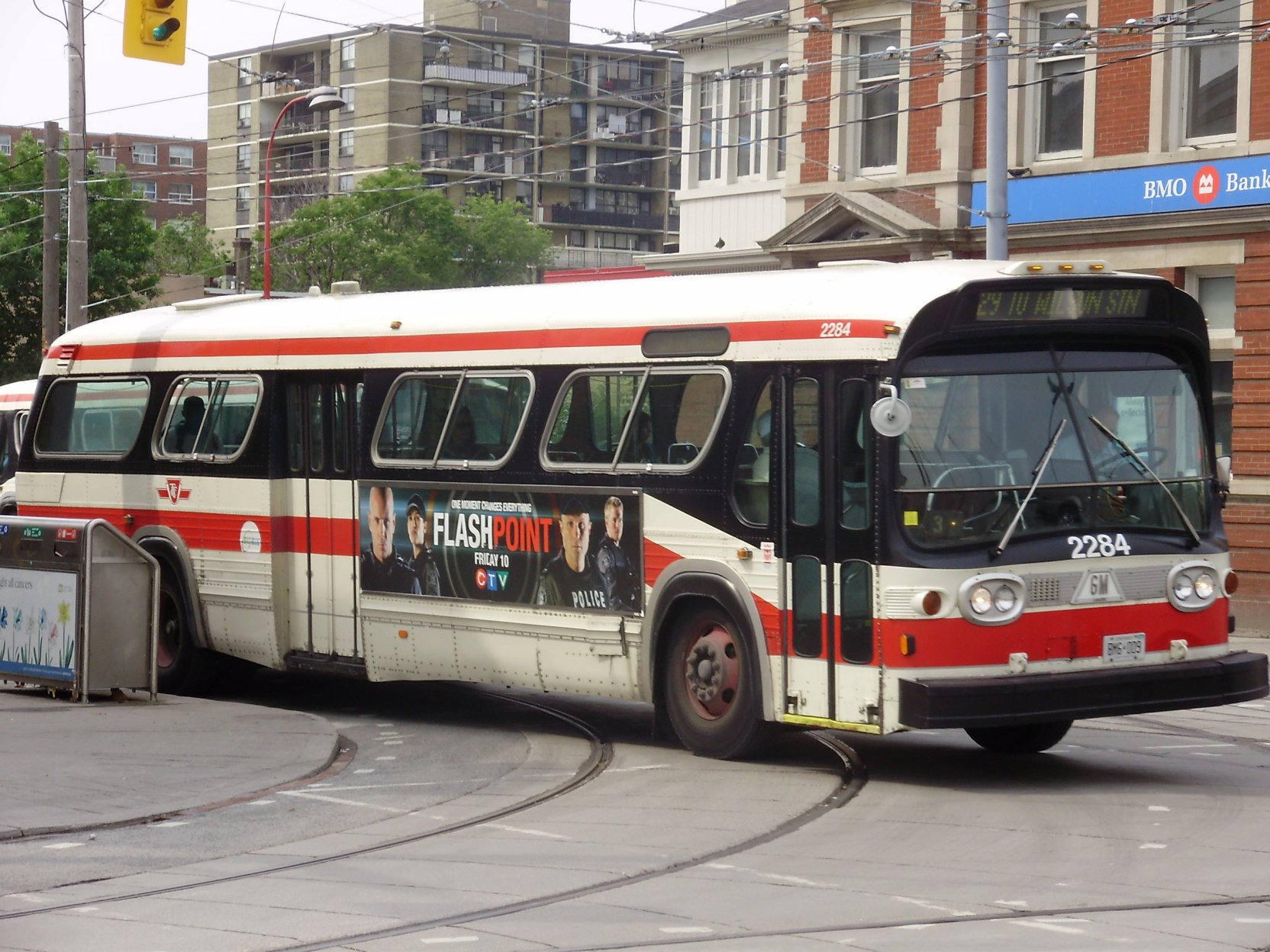
- A GM "New Look" bus model T6H-5307N in service for the Toronto Transit Commission (2008)

Overview
- Manufacturer: GM Truck and Bus (United States); GM Diesel Division (Canada)
- Production: 1959–1977 (U.S.); 1962–1986 (Canada)
- Assembly: United States: Pontiac, Michigan; Canada: London, Ontario; Saint-Eustache, Quebec

Body and chassis
- Class: Transit bus
- Body style: Monocoque stressed-skin

Powertrain
- Engine: 7.0 L (426 ci) Detroit Diesel 6V71 V6 diesel; 9.3 L (568 ci) Detroit Diesel 8V71 V8 diesel; 9.0 L (552 ci) Detroit Diesel 6V92TA V6 diesel
- Transmission: 4-speed non-synchromesh manual; 1-speed Allison VH automatic; 2-speed Allison VS-2 automatic; 3-speed Allison V730 automatic

Dimensions
- Wheelbase: 162 in (4.11 m), 235 in (5.97 m), or 285 in (7.24 m)
- Length: 29 ft (8.84 m), 35 ft (10.67 m), or 40 ft (12.19 m)
- Width: 96 in (2.44 m) or 102 in (2.59 m)
- Height: 121 in (3.07 m) (height over roof hatches)

Chronology
- Predecessor: GM/Yellow Coach "old look"
- Successor: GM RTS II (U.S.); GM Classic (Canada)

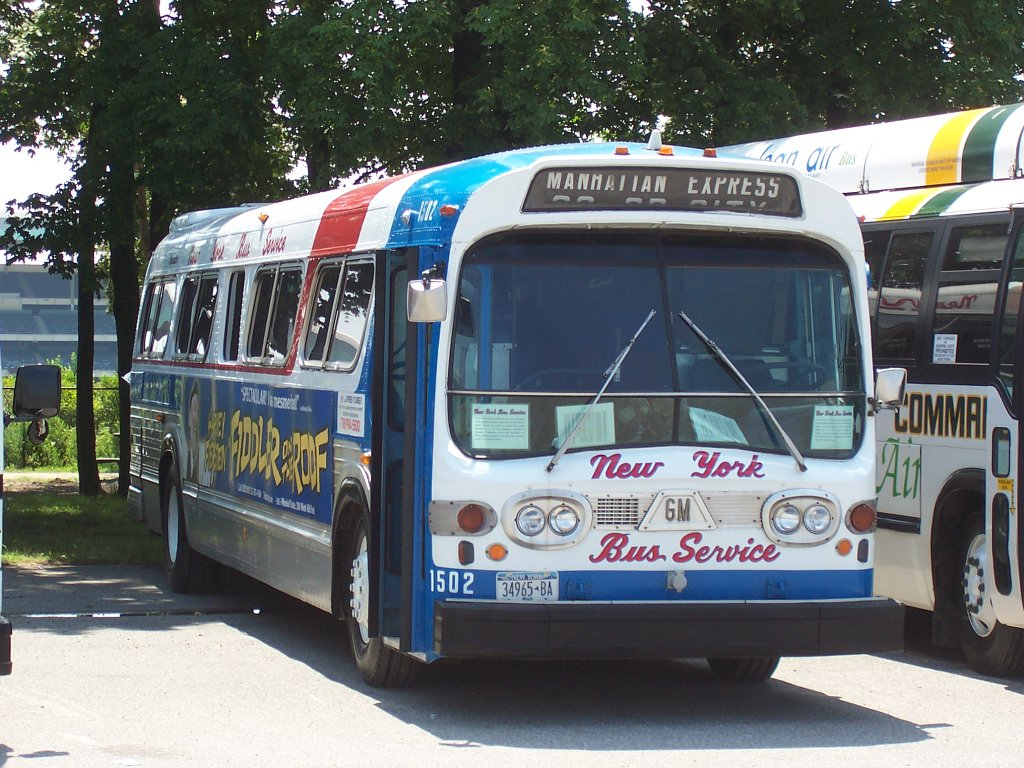
A restored GM "New Look" bus of the former New York Bus Service (now the MTA)

The GM New Look bus was a municipal transit bus that was introduced in 1959 by the Truck and Coach Division of General Motors to replace the company's previous coach, retroactively known as the GM "old-look" transit bus which was introduced in 1940.

Also commonly known by the nickname "Fishbowl" (for its original six-piece rounded windshield, later replaced by a two-piece curved pane), it was produced until 1977 in the United States, and until 1985 in Canada. The side windows were trapezoidal in shape, featuring a forward slant, and GM introduced quad headlights, which had first appeared in cars in 1958. More than 44,000 New Look buses were built. Its high production figures and long service career made it an iconic North American transit bus. The design is listed as U.S. patent D182,998 by Roland E. Gegoux and William P. Strong. Also introduced in 1959 was the competing Flxible New Look bus, which was similar looking but used flat panes of glass for the windshield.

The New Look was followed 18 years later in 1977 by the Rapid Transit Series (RTS), which was more modern-looking but did not sell as well and would be the last transit bus before GM exited the market.

== Production overview ==
44,484 New Look buses were built over the production lifespan, of which 33,413 were built in the U.S. and 11,071 were built in Canada (GM Diesel Division). Separated by general type, the production figures comprised 510 29-foot (8.8 m) city buses (all U.S.-built); 9,355 35-foot (10.7 m) city buses (7,804 U.S.-built, 1,551 Canadian); 31,348 40-foot (12.2 m) city buses (22,034 U.S., 9,314 Canadian) and 3,271 suburban coaches (of which only 206 were built in Canada). The total production of New Looks was 41,213 transit coaches and 3,271 suburban coaches.

Other than demonstrators, Washington, D.C., was the very first city to take delivery of any GM New Look buses, specifically TDH-5301s built in 1959 for O. Roy Chalk's D.C. Transit System, which operated in Washington, D.C., and the suburbs of Maryland and Virginia.

Several different models were introduced over the following years, and modifications made to the design. See the section below, headed "Description".

Production of the New Look in the U.S. ceased in 1977, when it was replaced by the RTS transit bus. Production continued after this, however, at General Motors Diesel Division in Canada, due to the RTS design being rejected by Canadian transit agencies, with the name plate changing from "GM" to "GMC". Few were produced after 1983 due to the GMDD's introduction of the Classic in that year. The last New Looks to be built were an order for Santa Monica Municipal Bus Lines (now Big Blue Bus) of Santa Monica, California, in 1986. The completion of that order brought a final end to New Look production in April 1986. At least one transit property, the Société de transport de l'Outaouais in Gatineau, Quebec, operated the model until at least 2015 nearly 60 years after introduction and more than 30 years after mass production ended, but has since retired the type from active use.

The last American-built New Look GM buses were ordered by the city of Wausau, Wisconsin, which placed an order for twelve 35-foot (10.7 m) transit buses, model T6H-4523N, the last of which was delivered in March 1977.

The GM Buffalo bus, a group of intercity bus models built between 1966 and 1980, shared many mechanical and body parts with the fishbowl models, and were discontinued by the Pontiac, Michigan, plant shortly after the RTS replaced fishbowl model production there.

GM later sold the rights to produce both Classic and RTS models to other manufacturers, and exited the heavy-duty transit and intercity markets for full-sized buses, although production of some medium-duty and light-duty chassis products sold in these markets continued.

== Description ==
Like GM's over-the-road buses, including the Greyhound Scenicruiser, the air-sprung New Look did not have a traditional ladder frame. Instead it used an airplane-like stressed-skin construction in which an aluminum riveted skin supported the weight of the bus. The wooden floor kept the bus's shape. The engine cradle was hung off the back of the roof. As a result, the GM New Look weighed significantly less than competitors' city buses.

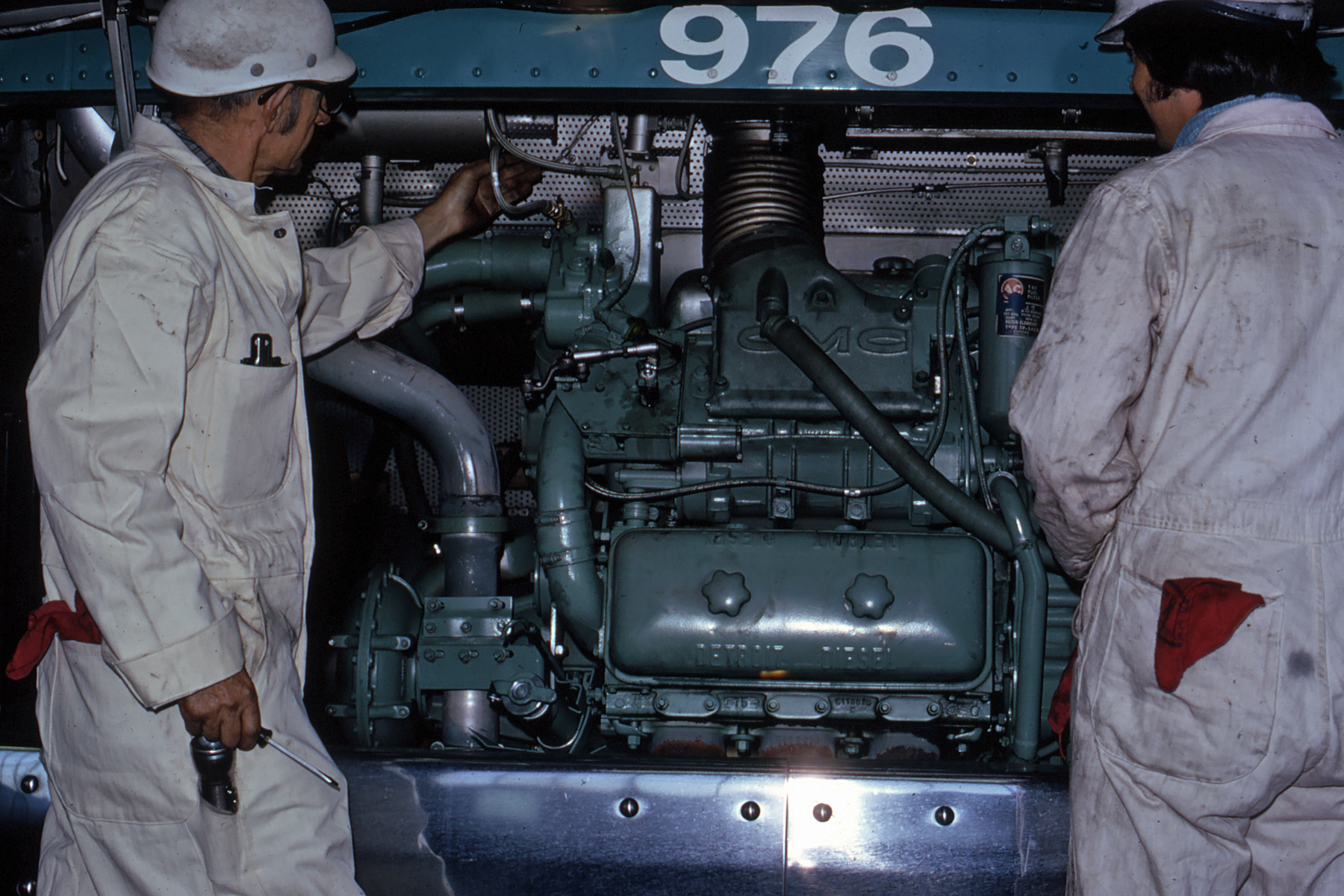
AC Transit mechanics examine the 6V71 engine of bus no. 976

Virtually all New Look buses were powered by Detroit Diesel Series 71 two-cycle diesel engines. The original engine was the 6V71 (V6). GM buses used a unique "Angle-drive" configuration with a transverse mounted engine. The transmission angled off at a 45-or-so degree angle to connect to the rear axle. The engines were canted backwards for maintenance access; in fact, the only parts not accessible from outside the bus were the right-hand exhaust manifold and the starter. The entire engine-transmission-radiator assembly was mounted on a cradle that could be quickly removed and replaced, allowing the bus to return to service with minimal delay when the powertrain required major maintenance. Originally, all New Looks were powered by the 6V-71. GM resisted V8 power but eventually gave in to pressure from customers.

(The exception to the above was the 29-foot (8.8 m) TDH-3301, which was powered by the GMC DH-478 Toroflow four-stroke V6, and had a more conventional T-drive transmission.)

Original transmission choices were a four-speed non-synchronized manual transmission with solenoid reverse and the Allison Automatic VH hydraulic transmission. The latter was essentially a one-speed automatic transmission which drove the wheels through a torque converter. At sufficient speed a clutch bypassed the torque converter and the engine drove the rear wheels directly. A later option was the VS-2, similar to the VH but with a two-speed planetary gearset with three modes: Hydraulic, direct (1:1), and direct-overdrive. The very last batch of American-built New Looks and most Canadian-built New Looks from 1977 through 1987 use the Allison V730 transmission, a traditional three-speed automatic with a lockup torque converter. These four transmissions were the only V-drive transmissions made.

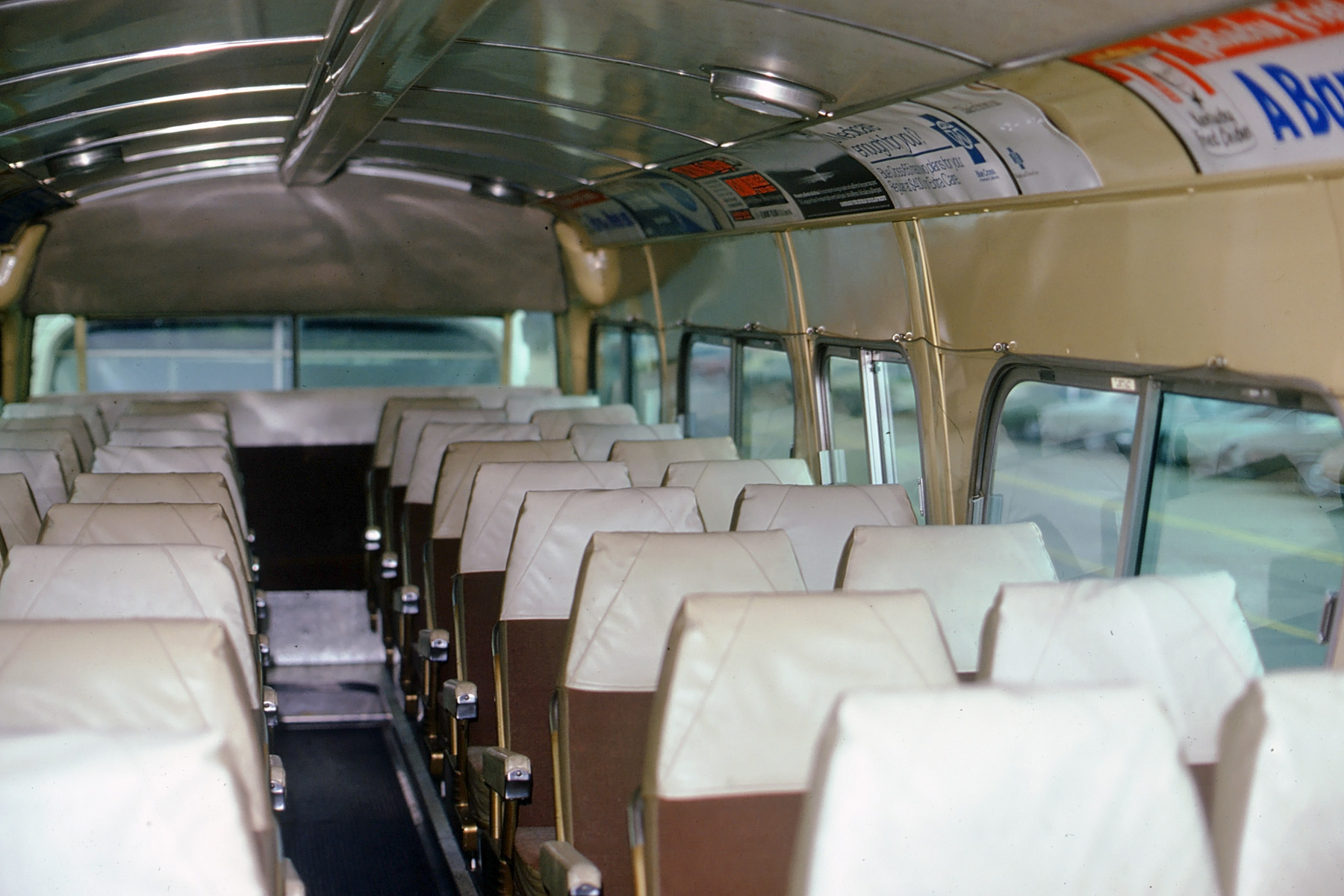
"Suburban" interior with high-back seats and "dropped" center floor

New Looks were available in both Transit and Suburban versions. Transits were traditional city buses with two doors; Suburbans had forward-facing seats (four-abreast), underfloor luggage bays, and had only one door. The floor beneath the seats was higher than the center aisle to accommodate the luggage bays. There were also "Suburban-style" transits which had forward-facing seats on slightly raised platforms that gave the appearance of a dropped center aisle. GM refused to install lavatories on these buses; at least one transit authority (Sacramento Transit Authority in Sacramento, California) added its own.

The New Look was built in 30 ft (9.1 m), 35 ft (10.7 m) and 40 ft (12.2 m) lengths and 96 and 102 in (2.44 and 2.59 m) widths. 35 and 40 ft (10.7 and 12.2 m) buses had different-length side windows, so the profiles of both buses looked very similar, but not the same. In the 1970s, AC Transit shortened several 35' New Look buses to 29' by removing a section from the middle for dial-a-ride demand-responsive service, maintaining common parts and drivers with the remainder of its fleet.

Double-width exit doors were offered as an option for 40-foot buses, in two styles: a single folding door or a pair of butterfly doors side-by-side. Where either type was used, the side window immediately behind the door was the size normally used in 35-foot buses.

In 1967 and 1968, Red Arrow Lines tested a GM New Look bus converted to operate as a railbus on its interurban routes and the Norristown High Speed Line.

=== Variants based on the New Look ===
Turbine engines

General Motors had been interested in developing gas turbine engines for highway use and showed the General Motors Firebird series of turbine-powered sports car concepts in the 1950s; to demonstrate the engine's practicality, GM fitted a copy of the same GT-300 "Whirlfire" engine from Firebird I into an "old-look" TDH-4512 transit bus and called it the "Turbo-Cruiser". For the 1964 New York World's Fair, the latest version of the gas turbine engine, designated GT-309, was fitted to a New Look bus (TDH-5303, serial #0001) and named "Turbo-Cruiser II"; the GT-309 was also fitted to the Chevrolet Tilt-Cab truck chassis and called "Turbo Titan III". The GT-309 developed power and torque comparable to the 8V-71 and weighed less, but fuel consumption and emissions proved to be intractable problems. The same TDH-5303 was later equipped with a continuously-variable transmission and rebranded "Turbo-Cruiser III". Production records also indicate a "Turbo-Cruiser V" was built using a T8H-5305A in 1969. The Turbo-Cruiser III drivetrain also was used on the "RTX" (Rapid Transit eXperimental) bus of 1968, prototyping the styling and features of the Rapid Transit Series, which succeeded the New Look buses starting in 1977.

Trolley buses

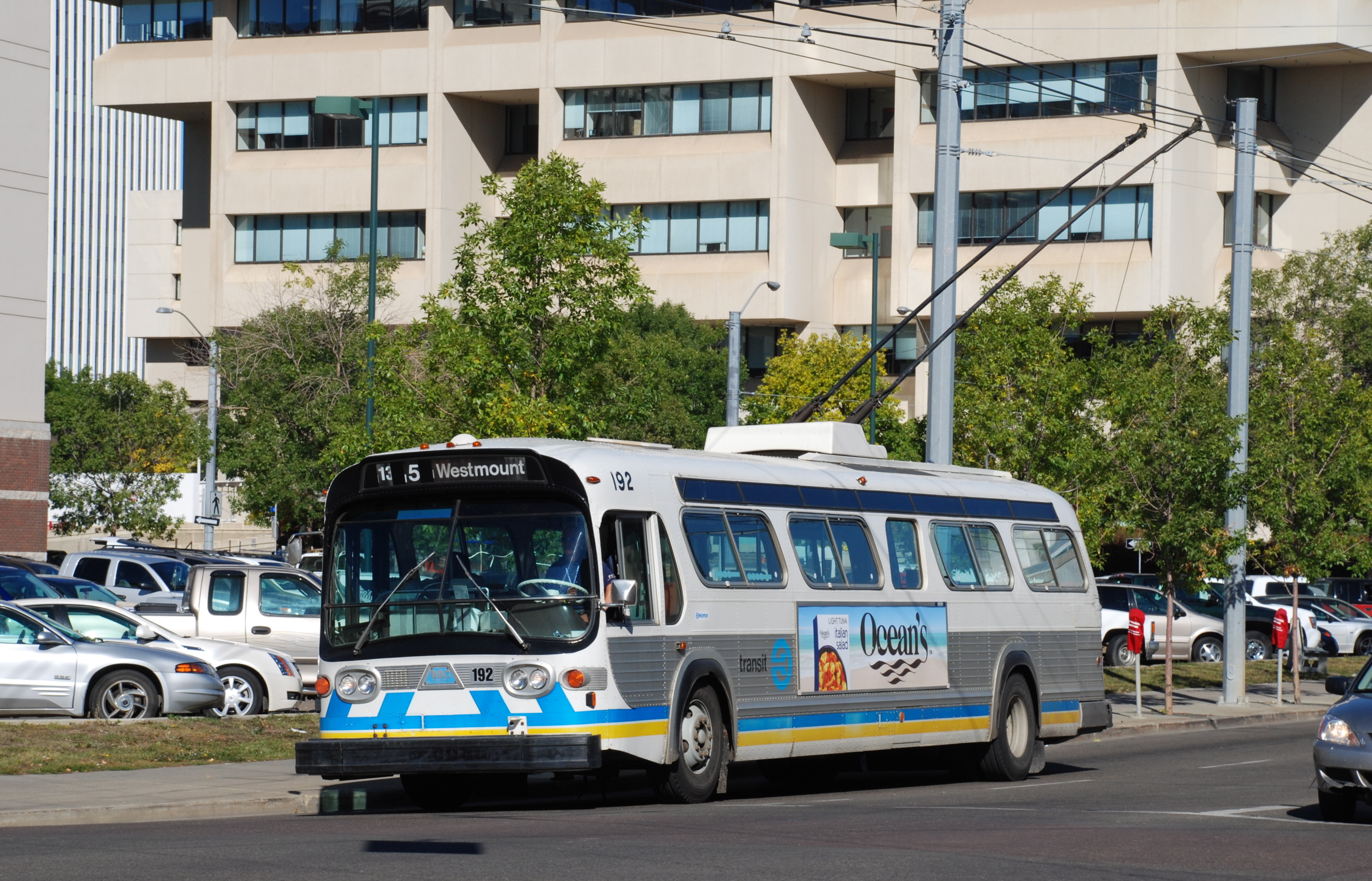
Brown Boveri trolleybus number 192

In 1981–82, Brown Boveri & Company constructed 100 model HR150G trolley buses from 40-foot (12.2 m) New Look bus shells for the Edmonton Transit System (ETS). Two coaches (No. 192 and 197) were sent to the Toronto Transit Commission (TTC) in late 1989 for evaluation as potential supplements to the aging Flyer E700 vehicles in the TTC's trolley bus system's fleet and placed in revenue service in January 1990; pleased with the results, TTC leased 38 more for a three-year term, starting in June 1990. All of the leased buses were in the group of ETS fleet numbers between #149 and #199; in TTC service, the leased buses were renumbered with a leading 9 but retained their ETS livery (color scheme). TTC decided to discontinue trolley bus service in January 1992 to reduce operating costs; as ETS would not allow an early return of the leased buses, TTC continued to run the leased buses on two reopened routes until July 1993.

Back in Edmonton, 19 of the returned trolley buses were retired and used for spare parts, while the rest of the fleet remained in use for 27 years until the Edmonton trolley bus system was shut down in 2009. Two were sold to the Greater Dayton Regional Transit Authority in 1996, where they were fitted with wheelchair lifts and operated in revenue service for approximately a decade to supplement the existing Flyer E800 fleet until both types were replaced by ETI 14TrE trolley buses. In December 2009, 28 were purchased by the private operator of the Plovdiv trolleybus system in Bulgaria, but upon arrival in the port of Burgas the trolleybuses were arrested by customs authorities over unpaid import duties. In 2012 the Plovdiv trolleybus system shut down as well, and in 2015 the trolleybuses were finally auctioned off and transferred to Yambol for scrapping.

The Dayton trolleybuses (#109 and 110) were moved into storage in 2004. Two others were preserved after Edmonton shut down the trolleybus system in 2009: the Illinois Railway Museum received #181 in Fall 2009 and the Seashore Trolley Museum received #125 in 2010.

Articulated buses

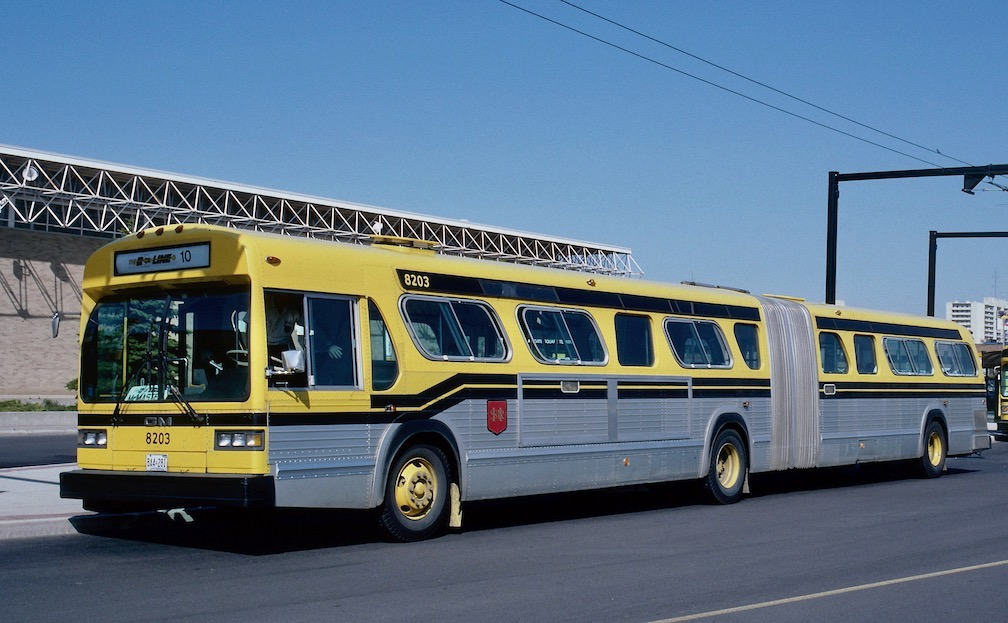
The articulated version, built only in 1982, had a New Look body but a Classic front end.

A 60-foot (18.3 m) articulated version was designed and built in 1982 for a Government of Ontario demonstration project. While a New Look body was used, a newer front (to allow a wider entrance), which would eventually be incorporated into the Classic transit bus, was used. For this reason, this model is sometimes not described as being a New Look and is not included in New Look production figures.

Series production took place in 1982–1983, and a total of only 53 were built. With the newer front and older body, these buses, which were model TA60-102N (for Transit Articulated 60 feet long × 102 inches wide No air-conditioning), were a transitional model. Unlike most other articulated buses with an engine in the front section and a powered middle axle, the TA60-102N utilized a "pusher" design that used a conventional New Look drive train and a specially designed anti-jackknifing articulated joint that limited the angle between the two section to 7° at normal speeds (while traveling straight forward) and to less than 2° at highway speeds. 12 were tested by TTC in 1982, but TTC chose to purchase a fleet of Orion III articulated buses instead.

== Model naming ==
The model naming for the GM New Look bus is shown below. Examples of model names are TDH-5301, T8H-5305N, T6H-5307N, S6H-4504A, and T6H-4521N. (Note that not all possible combinations were constructed.) The front end of the bus remained essentially the same through the production of the New Look.

Type	Engine	Transmission		Nominal seating capacity	Series	Air conditioning
T = transit bus S = suburban bus	1st & 2nd generation D = diesel G = gasoline 3rd & 4th generation 6 = Detroit Diesel 6V71; 6 = Detroit Diesel 6V92TA^{1} 8 = Detroit Diesel 8V71^{2}	H = hydraulic (automatic) transmission M = manual transmission	-	33 = 29 feet (8.8 m)^{3} 45 = 35 feet (10.7 m); 53 = 40 feet (12.2 m)	two digits^{4}	A = Air conditioning N = No air conditioning^{5}
NOTES: 1. The Detroit Diesel 6V92TA was available on 53-series buses as an alternative to the Detroit Diesel 6V71 and 8V71.; 2. Only 40-foot (12.2 m) buses were available with an 8V71 engine.; 3. The 33 passenger model was not offered in a Suburban version.; 4. For 40-foot buses: fourth digit odd, 102 inches wide; fourth digit even, 96 inches wide.; 5. "N" used for fourth generation only.

=== First generation (1959–1962) ===
Description: Distinctive 6-piece windshield, earning the nickname "Fishbowl" for the bus.; Tail lights were housed in streamlined nacelles modeled after afterburners.; Side roof signals were in geometric chrome strips.; "GM" logo was on a plaque with a black background.; In the first year of production, buses were built with pantograph wipers instead of single arm wipers.
Type	Models	Example (TDH-5301 shown)
Transit	4516: 35 ft (10.7 m) × 102 in (2.59 m); 4517: 35 ft (10.7 m) × 96 in (2.44 m); 5301: 40 ft (12.2 m) × 102 in (2.59 m); 5302: 40 ft (12.2 m) × 96 in (2.44 m)	
Suburban	4501: 35 ft (10.7 m) × 96 in (2.44 m); 5301: 40 ft (12.2 m) × 96 in (2.44 m)	
=== Second generation (1963–1967) ===
Description: Tail light nacelles were removed.; Side roof signals were placed in small bullet-pods.; Prototype XMC-53 (TDH-5303) with 8V71 was built in 1967 and tested by SF Muni, later entered revenue service as AC Transit #625.
Type	Models	Example (TDH-4519 shown)
Transit	4518: 35 ft (10.7 m) × 102 in (2.59 m); 4519: 35 ft (10.7 m) × 96 in (2.44 m); 5303: 40 ft (12.2 m) × 102 in (2.59 m); 5304: 40 ft (12.2 m) × 96 in (2.44 m)	
Suburban	4502: 35 ft (10.7 m) × 96 in (2.44 m); 5302: 40 ft (12.2 m) × 96 in (2.44 m)	
=== Third generation (1968–1971) ===
Description: same windshield as previous generation.; Tail lights were enlarged and given less flair.; Because of new FMCSA regulations, three roof head and tail lights, commonly called "Michigan markers", were added as standard equipment (they had been optional on first- and second-generation New Looks). First-generation New Looks had these lights installed in a roof-mounted bracket, called "Manhattan style"; thereafter each light was mounted directly on roof.; Third clearance light added at top center on either side, previously only at top corners. Bullet-pods of second-generation New Looks were eliminated.; Alternator-based electrical system introduced; previous generations used DC generators.; Slight update of driver's instrument panel: Voltmeter replaced previous generator warning light; separate left and right turn signal indicators replaced previous single DIR. SIGNAL light.; The logo was changed to "GMC" over a silver background.; The GM 8V71 engine became an option on 40-foot buses.; From this point on, only the 40 ft (12.2 m) transit model would be available in a 102 in (2.59 m) width.
Type	Models	Example (S8M-5303A shown)
Transit	3301: 29 ft (8.8 m) × 96 in (2.44 m); 4521: 35 ft (10.7 m) × 96 in (2.44 m); 5305: 40 ft (12.2 m) × 102 in (2.59 m); 5306: 40 ft (12.2 m) × 96 in (2.44 m)	
Suburban	4503: 35 ft (10.7 m) × 96 in (2.44 m); 5303: 40 ft (12.2 m) × 96 in (2.44 m)	
=== Fourth generation (1972–1977 U.S.; 1972–1986 Canada) ===
Description: Same front as the third generation.; For units built for American operators, the exhaust system was shifted from below the bus to the left of the rear window. Also used by Canadian operators; called Environmental Improvement Package.; A ventilation system on the right of the rear window became a popular option.; Roof ventilation/escape hatches introduced as an option from 1974, also very popular.; NEXT STOP lights introduced 1976–1979; allows bell to ring only once for each stop.; Starting in 1981, the 6V92TA engine became an engine option for the 5307 transit and 5304 suburban model.; 5309 and 5310 were developed for the Metropolitan Transportation Authority, in New York, as a variant of the 5307.; Front logo plate changed from "GMC" to "GM" around 1980–1982.
Type	Models	Example (T6H-5307N shown)
Transit	3302: 29 ft (8.8 m) × 96 in (2.44 m)^{1}; 4523: 35 ft (10.7 m) × 96 in (2.44 m); 5307: 40 ft (12.2 m) × 102 in (2.59 m); 5308: 40 ft (12.2 m) × 96 in (2.44 m); 5309: 40 ft (12.2 m) × 102 in (2.59 m)^{2}; 5310: 40 ft (12.2 m) × 102 in (2.59 m)^{2}	
Suburban	4504: 35 ft (10.7 m) × 96 in (2.44 m); 5304: 40 ft (12.2 m) × 96 in (2.44 m)	
NOTES: 1. The 3302 ceased production in 1973.; 2. The 5309 & 5310 were sold only to the New York MTA in 1972–1973. The 5309 had perimeter seating, while the 5310 had forward-facing suburban seating. They were assigned to MABSTOA, MSBA, NYCTA, and one 5310 police bus by the NYPD.

Manufacturing location was indicated by the serial number. No prefix was used for Pontiac, Michigan, C (Canada) indicated London, Ontario, and M (Montreal) Saint-Eustache, Quebec. All buses with 17-digit VINs were built in Saint-Eustache.

== Production figures by model ==
Production totals are through August 1980, when serial numbers changed to 17-digit vehicle identification numbers.

=== Transit ===
Model	U.S.A.		Canada	
Model	Quantity	Built	Quantity	Built
TGH-3301	13	1969–1971	0	-
TDH-3301	113	1969–1971	0	-
TDH-3301A	161	1969–1971	0	-
TDH-3302A/TDH-3302N	223	1972–1973	0	-
TDH-4516	149	1960–1962	0	-
TDH-4517	1,799	1959–1964	66	1962–1964
TDM-4517	6	1960–1962	0	-
TDH-4518	124	1963–1965	0	-
TDH-4519	1,959	1963–1967	401	1963–1968
TDM-4519	08	1963–1967	0	-
T6H-4521	369	1968–1971	329	1968–1972
T6H-4521A	849	1968–1971	0	-
T6H-4523A/T6H-4523N^{1}	2,562	1971–1977	537 + 95M	1972–1980
TDH-5301	3,794	1959–1964	186	1961–1964
TDM-5301	30	1961	0	-
TDH-5302	774	1960–1962	10	1964
TDM-5302	20	1961	0	-
TDH-5303	6,205	1963–1967	1,069	1963–1968
TDM-5303	65	1964–1967	0	-
TDH-5304	2,062	1963–1967	145	1963–1968
TDM-5304	57	1963–1965	0	-
T6H-5305	298	1967–1971	783	1968–1972
T6H-5305A	723	1968–1971	0	-
T6M-5305A	41	1968	0	-
T8H-5305	454	1968–1971	0	-
T8H-5305A	212	1968–1971	20	1970
T6H-5306	381	1968–1971	72	1968–1972
T6H-5306A	889	1968–1971	0	-
T6M-5306	50	1968	0	-
T8H-5306	5	1969–1970	0	-
T8H-5306A	344	1969–1971	0	-
T6M-5306A	46	1969	0	-
T6H-5307A/T6H-5307N^{2}	446	1972–1979	2,444 + 2,006M	1972–1979
T8H-5307A	3,131	1971–1977	62 + 77M	1973–1979
T6H-5308A/T6H-5308N	300^{3}	1971–1979	209^{4}	1972–1976
T8H-5308A/T8H-5308N^{5}	447	1972–1979	0	-
T6H-5309A	434	1972–1973	0	-
T6H-5310A	106	1972–1973	0	-
All Canadian figures are for London, Ontario, except for totals marked "M".: 1. No T6H-4523As were built in Canada.; 2. No T6H-5307As were built in Canada.; 3. Only one T6H-5308N was built in the U.S.^{(for Martucci Bus Company of West Orange, NJ)}; 4. No T6H-5308As were built in Canada.; 5. No T8H-5308Ns were built.

=== Suburban ===
Model	U.S.A.		Canada	
Model	Quantity	Built	Quantity	Built
SDH-4501	90	1960–1961	0	-
SDM-4501	116	1960–1962	19	1962
SDH-4502	53	1963–1967	33	1965–1968
SDM-4502	162	1963–1967	41	1963–1966
S6H-4503	3	1968–1971	8	1969
S6H-4503A	31	1968–1971	0	-
S6M-4503	16	1968–1969	2	1968
S6M-4503A	29	1968–1971	0	-
S6H-4504A	13	1972–1973	0	-
S6M-4504A	2	1972–1973	0	-
SDH-5301	3	1960–1961	0	-
SDM-5301	589	1960–1962	2	1963
SDH-5302	96	1963–1967	15	1965
SDM-5302	1,079	1963–1967	104	1964–1968
S8H-5303A	48	1969–1971	6	1970
S8M-5303A	298	1968–1971	3	1968
S8H-5304A	236	1972–1976	0	-
S8M-5304A	171	1972–1976	0	-

== In popular culture ==
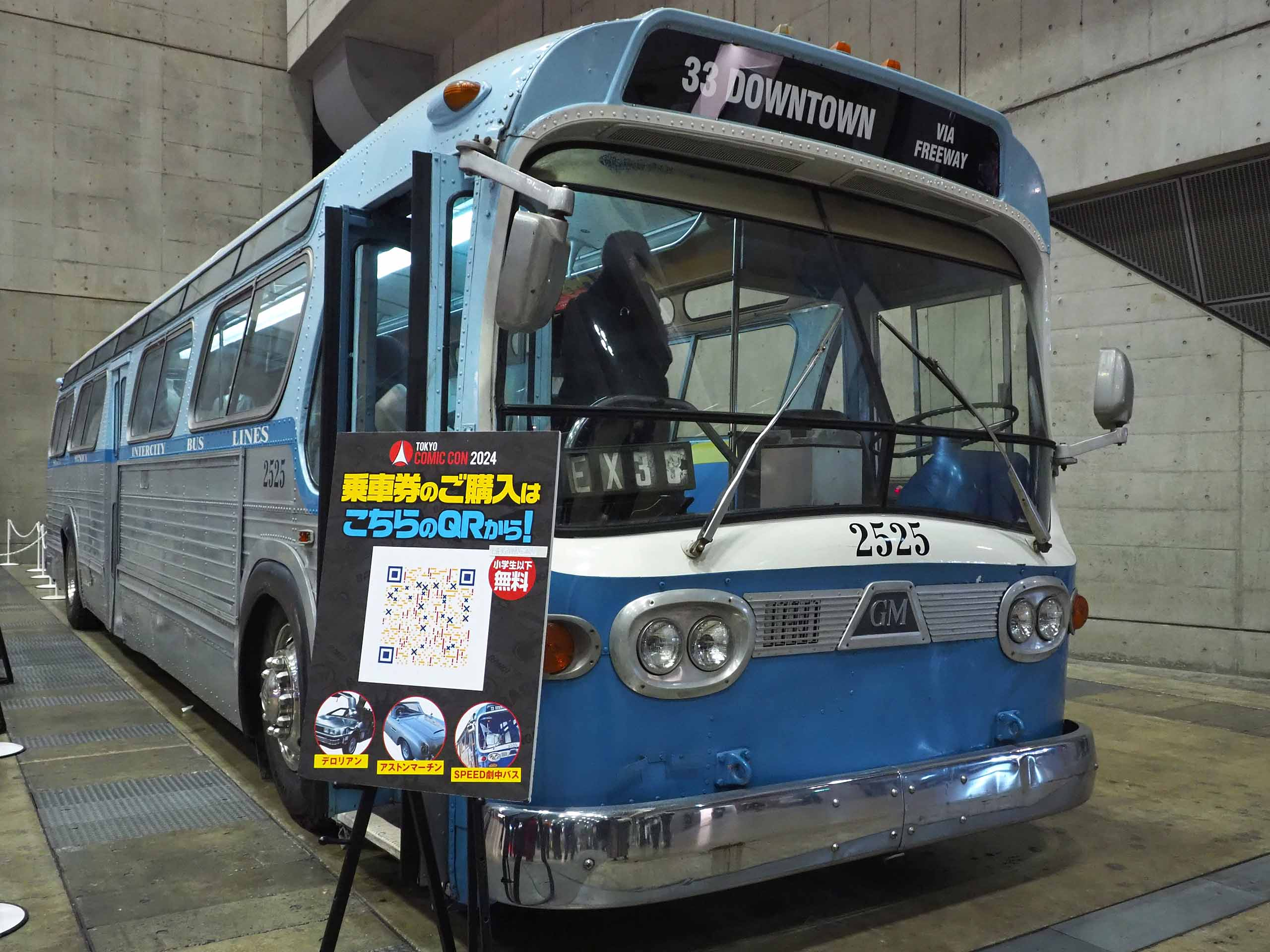
A GM New Look Bus featured in the 1994 action film Speed.

- One of the GM New Look models built in 1966 based in the livery of the Santa Monica Intercity Bus Lines has been featured in the 1994 film, Speed, along with the other New Looks.
- A Toronto Transit Commission GM New Look bus numbered 2481, then known as 8981, was seen in the 2010 film, Scott Pilgrim vs. The World, which was set in Toronto.
- A San Diego Transit Commission GM New Look model built in 1972 has been featured in the 1997 film, The Lost World: Jurassic Park, where it was involved in a chase with a Tyrannosaurus before it crashed into a Blockbuster store.

== See also ==
- GM "old-look" transit bus – predecessor model
- Flxible New Look bus – its main competitor
- Flyer 700/800/900 series – another competitor
- Rapid Transit Series – one of two successor models
- Classic (transit bus) – the Canadian successor model
- List of buses
