= 4340 steel =

Medium-carbon low-alloy strength steel

4340 steel is an ultra-high strength steel classified a medium-carbon, low-alloy steel. 4340 steel has high strength, ductility, toughness, creep resistance, and fatigue resistance relative to most other steels. Hardness ranging from 24 to 53 HRC can be achieved, depending on the heat treatment.

== Chemical Composition ==
Chemical composition, %
%	Iron (Fe)	Nickel (Ni)	Chromium (Cr)	Manganese (Mn)	Carbon (C)	Silicon (Si)	Molybdenum (Mo)	Phosphorus (P)	Sulfur (S)
Minimum	95.10	1.65	0.7	0.65	0.38	0.15	0.2	-	-
Maximum	96.27	2	0.9	0.9	0.43	0.35	0.3	0.010	0.010

== Mechanical Properties ==
The mechanical properties of 4340 are highly dependent on the heat treatment. 4340 can commonly have yield strengths of 740-1860 MPa, tensile strengths of 860-1980 MPa, elongations of 11-23%, and plane strain fracture toughness of 53-110 MPa√m.

The machinability of 4340 steel in the annealed condition is rated at 57%, based on AISI1212 (Free cutting, .12% C) as 100% speed reference.

== Applications ==
Applications of 4340 steel include heavy shafting, fasteners, aircraft, automotive, and hydraulic systems.

== Equivalent Grades ==
4340 Steel Equivalent Grades
USA	EU	Germany	Japan	France	England	Italy	China	Russia	Inter
4340	34CrNiMo6	1.6582	SNCM447	35NCD6	817M40	35CrNiMo6	40CrNiMo	40KHN2MA	36CrNiMo6
