= List of recreational vehicle manufacturers =

This is a non-exhaustive list of recreational vehicle manufacturers.

Manufacturer	Image	Location	Class A	Class B	Class C	Truck camper	Caravan (travel trailer)	Static caravan	5th wheel	Popup / hybrid	Other	Notes
AEONrv		Reno, Nevada, United States			X							
Adria Mobil		Novo Mesto, City Municipality of Novo Mesto, Slovenia	X	X	X		X			X		
Aliner		Mount Pleasant, PA, Pennsylvania, United States					X					The original A-frame manufacturer. Privately owned.
Airstream		Jackson Center, Ohio, United States		X			X					Subsidiary of Thor Industries. Provides trailers to the US Government
Auto-Sleepers		Broadway, Worcestershire, United Kingdom		X	X		X					
Auto-Trail		Grimsby, Lincolnshire, United Kingdom		X	X							
Bailey of Bristol		Bristol United Kingdom										
Beaver Motorcoach Corporation		Coburg, Oregon, United States										
Bedford Dormobile		Folkestone, Kent, United Kingdom		X	X							Defunct
Blue Mountain Camper Co.		Pilot Mountain, North Carolina					X					Builds Tiny Rot-Free Composite Campers
Boles Aero		Burbank, California, United States					X					Defunct.Produced travel trailers from 1946 to 1980.
Caravans International		Saffron Walden, Essex, United Kingdom					X					Defunct. Formed by Sam Alper. After becoming defunct, assets sold to Cosalt|
Caraboat		Lemon Tree Passage, New South Wales, Australia										
Casita		Rice, Texas, Texas, United States					X					
Coachman Caravans		Hull, East Yorkshire, United Kingdom										
Cosalt		Grimsby, Lincolnshire, United Kingdom					X	X				No longer manufacturing. Bought most of the assets/brands of collapsed Caravans International. Sold touring caravan assets to Swift Leisure, later spinning-out static caravan assets via MBO
Cortes Molded Fiberglass Trailer	Molded fiberglass	Euclid, Ohio, United States										Defunct
Elddis		Consett, County Durham, United Kingdom					X					Subsidiary of Hymer
The Explorer Group		Consett, County Durham, United Kingdom					X					Part of Elddis, subsidiary of Hymer.
Fendt Caravan		Mertingen, Donau-Ries, Germany										
Fleetwood Enterprises		Riverside, California, United States	X		X							Merged into Allied Specialty Vehicles in 2010. Part of REV Group.
Forest River RV		Elkhart, Indiana, United States	X		X				X	X	X	A Berkshire Hathaway company.
Giottiline		Colle di Val d'Elsa, Province of Siena, Italy										
GMC motorhome		Pontiac, Michigan, United States	X									
Grand River RV		Cambridge, Ontario, Canada					X	X		X		
Gulfstream Coach		Nappanee, Indiana, United States										
Heartland Recreational Vehicles		Elkhart, Indiana, United States							X			Subsidiary of Thor Industries
Holdsworth Motorhomes		Woodley, Berkshire, United Kingdom		X								Defunct
Holiday Rambler		Coburg, Oregon, United States	X	X	X							Part of REV Group.
Hymer		Bad Waldsee, Baden-Württemberg, Germany	X	X	X		X					
Jayco		Middlebury, Indiana, United States	X		X		X		X	X		Subsidiary of Thor Industries.
Jurgens Ci Caravans		Ga-Rankuwa, Gauteng, South Africa										
Keystone RV		Goshen, Indiana, United States					X		X		X	Subsidiary of Thor Industries.
Kimberley Kampers		United States, Australia		X			X		X	X	Motorhome	
Livin Lite RV		Shipshewana, Indiana, United States										
Martin Walter of Folkestone		Folkestone, Kent, United Kingdom										Products produced under the Dormobile brand
Mauck Special Vehicles		Worthington, Ohio, United States										
Millennium Luxury Coaches		Sanford, Florida, United States										
Mini Wildgoose		Worthing, Sussex, United Kingdom										
Monaco Coach Corporation		Decatur, Indiana, United States	X									Part of REV Group.
REV Group		Milwaukee, Wisconsin, United States										
Safari Motorcoach Corporation		Harrisburg, Oregon, United States										
Safari Trek Motorhome		Harrisburg, Oregon, United States										
SEA Group		Trivolzio, Lombardy, Italy										
Shasta		Los Angeles, California, United States					X					A division of Forest River, Inc.
Spacecraft Manufacturing		Concordia, Missouri, United States							X			Manufactures the largest fifth wheel trailers as full size semi-trailers from 40 to 57 ft (12.2 to 17.4 m) that require a tractor unit as the towing vehicle.
Sportsmobile		Huntington, Indiana, United States		X								
Swift Leisure		Cottingham, East Yorkshire, United Kingdom	X	X	X		X					Purchased former assets of Cosalt
Thor Motor Coach		Elkhart, Indiana, United States	X	X	X							Subsidiary of Thor Industries. The number one retail selling motorhome brand in North America, January 1, 10 through December 31, 2011. Formerly Damon Motor Coach and Four Winds International
Tonke		Wagenberg, North Brabant, Netherlands										
Toppola		Sweden										
Travco		Brown City, Michigan, United States	X									
Triple E Recreational Vehicles		Winkler, Manitoba, Canada		X	X							
Tuscany Luxury Motorhomes		Elkhart, Indiana, United States	X									Subsidiary of Thor Industries. Builds only diesel pushers in the United States and Canada
Vixen (RV)		Pontiac, Michigan, United States	X									
Volkswagen Westfalia Camper		Rheda-Wiedenbrück, Westphalia, Germany										
Wanderlodge		Fort Valley, Georgia, United States	X									Defunct
Westfalia		Rheda-Wiedenbrück, Westphalia, Germany		X								Defunct. Now a brand of the Volkswagen Group
Winnebago		Forest City, Iowa, United States	X	X	X		X		X			
Xplorer Motorhomes		Elkhart, Indiana, United States		X								
Zone RV		Coolum, Sunshine Coast, Australia					X			X		
