= Tonke =

Tonke may refer to:

== People ==
- Laura Tonke (born 1974), German actress
- Tonke Dragt (born 1930), Dutch writer and illustrator

== Other ==
- Tonke (company), Dutch manufacturer of motorhomes

== See also ==
- Tonka, US brand of toy trucks
