= Sea Group =

Sea Group may refer to:

- Sea Limited, an e-commerce and video game development company. The company is formerly known as Garena and currently does business as Garena.
- S E A Holdings, a real estate developer based in Hong Kong. Also known as SEA Group
- SEA Group, Italian headquartered motorcaravan manufacturer
