= Auto-Trail =

British motorhome manufacturer

- Industry: Recreational Vehicles
- Founded: 1982
- Headquarters: Europarc, Grimsby, Lincolnshire, UK
- Products: Motorhomes
- Website: https://www.auto-trail.co.uk/

Auto-Trail is a British motorhome manufacturer, established by Bill Boasman and Barry Holmes in 1982. As of 2022, the company employed around 200 staff members at its manufacturing site in Grimsby, Lincolnshire.

== History ==
After both working at Astral, Boasman and Holmes worked together at Cosalt in Grimsby, and together founded the caravan division known as Humber Caravan Co. alongside Len Funnell. This caravan division was then renamed as Abbey Caravan Company. Boasman left in 1971 to begin working at Mustang.

In 1982, Boasman created the first coach-built Auto-Trail motorhome, the Auto-Trail Cheyenne, with the Peugeot 504 chassis.

The early 1990s found the Mohawk and Cheyenne models growing in popularity. The Cheyenne range was originally a budget build for the hire fleets, but it became popular with private buyers, so Auto-Trail developed the Rico luxury pack and Sport range.

Auto-Trail was bought out by A.B.I Caravans although Auto-Trail remained at its Grimsby factory. ABI went out of business in 1998 and Auto-Trail was sold to the Italian Ci Group, owned by the larger Trigano Group in 1999.

In 2015, Auto-Trail began an expansion for their Grimsby site. The new production lines were designed to be more efficient and roughly doubled production numbers.

Auto-Trail added the Tribute range into the main Auto-Trail line-up in 2017 after manufacturing moved from Italy to the company's main premises in Grimsby.

== Current ranges ==
Auto-Trail currently produces both camper vans and motor-homes. Additionally, they provide vehicle servicing in the Auto-Trail factory in Grimsby, UK.
