= The Feel Good Family =

The Feel Good Family is an Australian family travel group, consisting of Paul Guerin, Katie Guerin, and their son Jasper, who document their full-time caravan travels around Australia. The family produces weekly travel videos and social media content about their caravan travels in Australia. They run a YouTube channel titled The Feel Good Family – Lap Around Australia Series, which features their ongoing "Big Lap" around the country and family travel adventures. Since 2019, the Guerins have developed a digital presence that includes podcasts and television programs related to their travels.

== Background ==
Paul and Katie Guerin are from the Gold Coast, Queensland, and both had established careers in entertainment and media before embracing a travel-focused life. Paul Guerin worked in children's entertainment and television production, performing for brands such as Warner Bros., Cartoon Network, and Walt Disney Television Australia, and holding production roles on programs like The Voice, Young Talent Time, and The Amazing Race. He also served in management positions including Entertainment Supervisor at Warner Bros. Movie World, Entertainment Director at Australia Zoo, and General Manager of Education, Creative & Community Engagement at the National Trust of Australia (Queensland). Katie Guerin's background is in events and corporate management – she worked closely with high-profile figures like Steve Irwin and Terri Irwin at Australia Zoo and executives from eBay and PayPal, and produced large-scale events and tourism award campaigns.

After the birth of their son Jasper (born after a lengthy IVF journey), Paul and Katie began rethinking their lifestyle and priorities. They cited a desire to prioritise family time as a factor in their decision to travel full-time. In 2017, the couple set in motion a two-year plan to downsize, save money, and prepare for a life on the road. By September 2019, they had "packed up [their] lives and hit the road for full time travel around Australia" in a caravan, departing their traditional jobs to pursue an open-road family adventure. The article states that the couple left their previous employment to travel full-time with their child. They started out as complete newcomers to caravanning, learning as they went and hoping to encourage others to "take their own leap of faith" toward outdoor exploration.

== YouTube and digital media presence ==
The Feel Good Family's travels are primarily showcased on their YouTube channel, which features weekly episodes of their Lap Around Australia travel series. On the channel, Paul and Katie produce fully edited travelogues under the series title Family Travel Australia, highlighting destinations, road trip tips, and day-to-day life in a caravan. By 2025, their YouTube channel had more than 50,000 subscribers and featured hundreds of travel videos. The content is family-friendly and informative, documenting their route across every state and territory and accumulating over 160,000 km (99,000 mi) of journeying by late 2023. Their content includes travel advice related to RV travel, outdoor cooking, and homeschooling.

In addition to video content, The Feel Good Family produces an audio series, the Travel Australia Podcast by The Feel Good Family. Launched during their travels, this weekly podcast provides a forum for deeper discussions about Australian destinations, travel tips, and interviews with fellow travellers and experts. The podcast is hosted by Katie and Paul and covers topics ranging from road safety and RV maintenance to personal stories from around the country. It has been noted for including segments on RV industry news and special guest interviews, further engaging their community of listeners. Through their active presence on YouTube, podcast platforms, and other social media (such as Instagram and Facebook), Paul and Katie have fostered an online community of travel enthusiasts. They often interact with their followers by sharing travel guides, answering questions about caravan life, and encouraging a spirit of adventure. According to the family, the camaraderie among viewers and fellow travellers "has impacted us the most," creating a supportive community around camping and caravanning.

== Television appearances ==
Beyond digital media, The Feel Good Family's adventures have been featured on Australian television. In 2024, the family debuted their own TV series called Feel Good Road Trips on the Seven Network. The series premiered nationally on 7TWO on 3 March 2024 and is presented in partnership with Stratus Outdoors, an outdoor gear brand. Feel Good Road Trips is a six-part travel program produced by Channel 7 (Seven Network) in which Paul, Katie, and Jasper explore different regions by road. Season 1 of the show focuses on journeys through South Australia – highlighting the Flinders Ranges, Eyre Peninsula, and other locales – with the family sharing itinerary tips, local history, and on-the-road experiences. The television series includes travel segments on Australian destinations and interactions with local residents. By the time of the show's launch, Jasper was seven years old, and the family had been travelling for four years continuously.

In addition to their dedicated series, the Guerins have made guest appearances on several other programs and news segments. They were featured on Channel 7 Queensland's long-running travel and outdoors show Creek to Coast in 2022, joining the show's crew to demonstrate an "easy camping meals" segment filmed on K'gari (Fraser Island). The family has also been interviewed on ABC Radio National (ABC RN) about their lifestyle change and experiences, and profiled in a human-interest segment on the 7 News network. These media appearances typically highlight the growing trend of young families undertaking "Big Lap" journeys around Australia, with Paul and Katie sharing how they manage work, education for Jasper, and finances while on the road. Coverage of their story has appeared in print and online outlets as well – for example, a 2019 feature in Ocean Road Magazine introduced The Feel Good Family to readers as "an ordinary Australian family creating extraordinary experiences" by swapping the routine for full-time travel. The family has noted that such exposure has helped broaden their audience and connect them with like-minded travellers.

== Community television ==
The Feel Good Family's travelogue series is also broadcast on Australian community television, expanding its reach to free-to-air audiences. Since the early 2020s, Paul and Katie have partnered with Channel 31 (C31) in Melbourne and Channel 44 (C44) in Adelaide to air weekly episodes of their series on those community TV stations. The show, typically just titled The Feel Good Family on television, occupies a prime-time slot (for example, 7:00 pm on Sundays) on these channels. According to cited sources, the series drew an estimated monthly viewership of over 50,000 on community television.

In 2023, the new national streaming platform CTV+ was launched to host community television content online, and The Feel Good Family's episodes became available there as well. Viewers across Australia (and later in New Zealand) can stream the family's back-catalogue of travel episodes on CTV+ at any time, effectively giving the series a wider digital broadcast footprint. Community TV involvement has been mutually beneficial: the Guerins receive broader exposure and credibility by airing on public television, while C31/C44 gain fresh travel content that appeals to a younger demographic of "road tripping" families. Channel 31 Melbourne's general manager noted that community TV provides a space for independent and diverse content that mainstream media may overlook, and The Feel Good Family's program is an example of that appeal. As of 2025, the family's show is also set to be broadcast on Sky TV in New Zealand, marking their expansion beyond Australia's borders. Their presence on community television and online platforms exemplifies how grassroots creators can find a place in traditional media through community broadcasters.

== Awards and recognition ==
Paul and Katie Guerin's work with The Feel Good Family has earned recognition in the Australian community media sector. In October 2023, their series won the Antenna Award for Best Outdoor and/or Recreational Program. The Antenna Awards are the national awards for community television, the series won the 2023 Antenna Award for Best Outdoor and/or Recreational Program, an award decided within the community television sector. The award was presented at a ceremony in Melbourne and highlighted the Guerins' achievement in creating engaging recreational content for a broad audience. Channel 31 (Melbourne) and Channel 44 (Adelaide) both acknowledged the family's accolade; in press releases and news updates, the stations listed The Feel Good Family as the category winner and praised the diversity of content on community TV that year. Winning an Antenna Award, which is peer-judged within the community broadcasting industry, affirmed the family's successful transition from private sector careers to independent filmmakers and presenters.

Recently, The Feel Good Family won the award for Outstanding Digital Engagement by a Program at the 2025 Antenna Awards, was held in November 2025 from Melbourne.

Aside from the Antenna Award, The Feel Good Family has been recognised informally through positive media coverage and community feedback. Their story has been featured by organisations such as the National Trust of Queensland, which partnered with the family early in their journey as travel ambassadors for heritage and conservation sites. The National Trust noted the innovative approach the Guerins took to promote cultural and environmental heritage by documenting their visits to historical sites while on the road. The family's commitment to eco-conscious and educational travel content also aligns with broader trends in the caravanning industry, sometimes dubbed the rise of "green nomads" – younger families choosing sustainable travel lifestyles. Industry groups and travel brands have commended The Feel Good Family for their authentic style of promotion; for instance, caravan manufacturers and tourism boards (such as Zone RV and Capricorn Enterprise in Queensland) have collaborated with the family and highlighted the value of their content in inspiring everyday Australians to explore their country. While these are not awards per se, they illustrate the reputation and influence the family has built within the travel and camping community.
