= Sam Alper =

English caravan designer (1924–2002)

Samuel Alper OBE (25 April 1924 – 2 October 2002) was an English caravan designer and manufacturer responsible for the famous Sprite caravan, founder of the Little Chef chain of roadside restaurants, a viticulturist who revived the ancient Roman winery at Chilford Hall, a sculptor, the founder of the Curwen Print Study Centre for teaching printmaking and a philanthropist who sent caravans abroad to aid in disaster relief programmes.

== Early life ==
Alper was born in Forest Gate, then in Essex, now part of the London Borough of Newham. On leaving school at 14 he went to night school to study electrical engineering. When the Second World War was declared, he volunteered for the Navy and found himself serving with the Fleet Air Arm where his electrical engineering training was put to good use rewiring Swordfish biplanes.

== Career ==
=== Sprite caravans ===
On the cessation of hostilities, Alper went to work for his brother Henry in his newly established caravan company, Alperson Products, in Stratford, east London. Henry soon left leaving Sam with the company. Materials were in short supply in the austerity of post-war Britain and Alper had to make the first caravans out of what he could get. By 1947 he had designed and made his first touring caravan with magnesium wheels and suspension and the brakes from a Spitfire fighter aircraft. The roof was made out of the material from barrage balloons.

Those first caravans were, in Alper's opinion, too expensive and he decided to try to produce a cheaper, lighter version that could be towed by an ordinary family saloon car. Within a year the Sprite was launched. Built from tempered hardboard, it sold for less than £200. One of Alper's relatives suggested the name and it soon caught on as he sold 500 caravans in the first year of production. In 1951 he towed one of his caravans to an international caravan rally in Florence, Italy as a publicity stunt.

The following year he tried something a bit more ambitious, a 10,000-mile (16,000 km) trip round the Mediterranean towing a caravan behind a 3.5-litre SS Jaguar. Roads in Yugoslavia and Greece were found to be impassable so he had to go part of the way by train, and in the Sahara he had to be rescued by local tribesman who dug him out of the sand. A 1956 test carried out at Motor Industry Research Association (MIRA) proving grounds near Nuneaton in Warwickshire, saw 30,000 miles (48,000 km) of testing produce just one broken gas mantle.

The Alperson Sprite proved so popular that production was moved to Newmarket in Suffolk and in 1959 the Sprite Caravan Owners' Club was launched.

=== Caravans International ===
By 1963, Alper had founded Caravans International, which had purchased the Eccles brand and merged with Bluebird Caravans, and distributed these and the Sprite brand to Europe, South Africa, Canada and the United States. In 1966 Caravans International won the Queen's Awards for Enterprise and Alper was made OBE for his services to exports.

Soon there were several models in different sizes. The Sprite 400 was designed to be towed by smaller family cars such as the Volkswagen Beetle. Originally launched in 1960 it went through several incarnations until being withdrawn in 1976 but made a brief reappearance in 1985.

In 1970 Caravans International decided to cater for the small car owner and introduced the Sprite Cadet, just 8' 6" long and with a door located unusually at the rear. It had a small wardrobe, basic kitchen and compact small dinette at the front. Designed to sell at £227 the model was first launched with a large plastic roof vent which soon earned it the name of the bubble-top. After one season the model was withdrawn and launched again for the 1971 season with a new sleeker shell.

Alper served as treasurer and then chairman of the National Caravan Council, the industry body, for many years. He was also among those who set up the European Caravan Federation and served as president for almost a decade. Recognising the up and down nature of the caravan industry and its seasonal character Alper spread his interests further, developing the first successful table football game, Soccerette, he built yachts for a time and was also responsible for the first popular brand of roadside diner in Britain.

The recession of the 1980s took a heavy toll on the British caravan industry, and in 1982 Caravans International went into liquidation. The rights to the various brands were sold to Hull-based Cosalt, who kept the CI brand but renamed the division Cosalt International. Cosalt today still manufacture static caravans under the CI brand, but sold the touring caravan business to Swift Leisure.

=== Little Chef ===
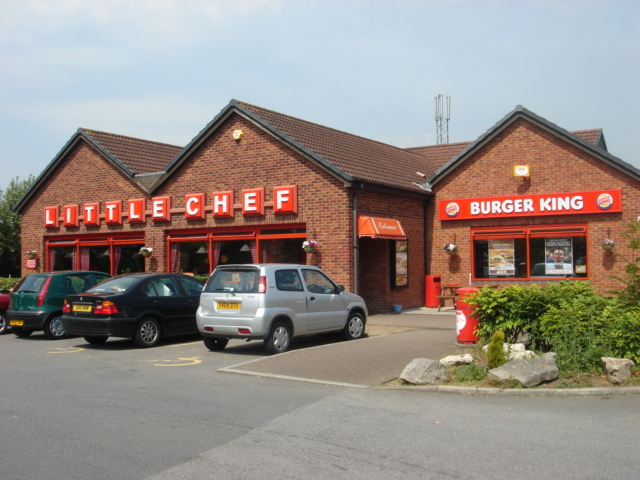
A Little Chef outlet on the A64 near Askham Richard

Alper based the Little Chef concept on the small diners he had seen while marketing his caravans in the United States. The first restaurant opened near Reading in Berkshire in 1958 and had just eleven seats. Based principally on Britain's A-roads, they were ideally suited to the new breed of travellers taking to the expanding road network and soon Little Chefs with their now iconic logo were springing up all over the country. With little or no commercial competition they proved remarkably popular and within ten years the brand had been subsumed into the Gardner Merchant group of companies which eventually became a part of Trust House Forte. Continuing to innovate, Little Chef introduced cheap travellers' hotels alongside some of the restaurants. By 1996 the brand was taken over by Granada plc at which point Alper sold his interest in the company.

=== Chilford Hall ===
In 1966, Alper bought a group of old farm buildings in Linton near Cambridge with a view to turning them into a conference, banqueting and cultural centre. The oldest building at Chilford Hall is the Little Barn, built in the early 18th century. The Great Hall is a Grade II listed building dating from 1820 and the house itself dates from 1840 although there has been a farm at the site since Saxon times. Alper added to the property over the years adding an art gallery in 1971 and the Pavilion from 1968 with major alterations made in 1997. The barn complex was destroyed by arsonists in 2012.

In 1972 he planted 18 acres of vineyard which was extended between 1974–76 and he established a winery making a range of English wines using nine different grape varieties. He set up the East Anglian Wine Growers' Association and served as a Board Member of the English Vineyard Association. His wines have won numerous awards and Alper, displaying his usual flair for publicity would regularly promote the wine by taking part in the Great English Wine Rally, driving samples of his wine to the George V Hotel, Paris in his 1930s Phantom II Rolls-Royce.

Privately, he was an opera enthusiast and a collector of modern art and was himself a sculptor in stone who appreciated fine architecture. He incorporated some examples into the buildings at Chilford Hall including some marble pillars from the Long Bar at Waterloo railway station to be found in the wine cellar and the pink marble staircase from the old London Stock Exchange building can be found in the bar in the Great Hall.

His artistic interests also saw Alper bring the Curwen Studio to Chilford Hall in 1989 when he became aware that the studio's lease of Tottenham Court Road, London, was about to expire. The Curwen Press had been established in 1863 by the Reverend John Curwen in Plaistow. His grandson Harold transformed the business from being principally a music printers into a fine art printers and lithographers and they established a reputation for excellence that earned them exhibitions with both Tate Gallery and the Royal Academy as well as commissions from noted artists such as Henry Moore, Barbara Hepworth and Graham Sutherland. In bringing the studio to Chilford Hall Alper expressed his strong admiration for the arts over many years. Later, he also established the Curwen Print Study Centre, an educational charity permitting people from as young as seven years of age and of all abilities to learn about different forms of printmaking.

== Philanthropy ==
Alper owned a hotel in Gibraltar for many years and was instrumental in setting up the Gibraltar Heritage Trust in Gibraltar and the Friends of Gibraltar Heritage Society in England. For many years he was associated with the Rotary Club, beginning in the 1970s when he arranged for 50 caravans to be delivered to Italy for the relief of flood victims. In 2000 the Rotary Club awarded him the Paul Harris Fellowship in recognition of his part in the club's 1999 project to find and send nearly 200 serviceable caravans to earthquake areas in Greece and Turkey with the help and encouragement of Crown Princess Katherine of Yugoslavia through the charity Lifeline Humanitarian Organization (Canada). He also established a family trust to buy instruments for young musicians.

== Personal life ==
Alper had one son and one daughter with his first wife, Isabel Grist and a son with his second wife, Fiona Morton. He died at home in Chilford Hall, Linton, near Cambridge in 2002 at the age of 78.
