= Giottiline =

Giottiline Company
- Company type: Private
- Industry: Recreational vehicles
- Founded: 2004
- Headquarters: Colle Val d'Elsa, Italy
- Area served: world wide
- Products: campervan and motorhome
- Revenue: € 77.757.010 (2022)
- Number of employees: 112 (2024)
- Parent: Rapido group
- Website: official site

Giottiline is an Italian campervans and motorhome manufacturer.

== History ==
In 2004 Giotti family founded Giottiline, which right away arrived at the top of the market thanks to their proposal of innovative vehicles. Therry range of low-profile and coach-built vehicles, along with the G-Line motorhome, put the company in the luxury market segment between 2007 and 2012. After being purchased by PLA in 2014, in 2016 Giottiline joined Rapido group, one of the most important in the European recreational vehicle industry. This culture and skill sharing helped create new innovative and high-quality ranges. In 2022, the end of an important expansion of the industrial plant allowed a further growth with the opening of the new production line in Colle di Val d'Elsa.

== Production ==
The manufacturing is currently composed of series Siena, Toscan, Giottivan and Compact, which include low-profile, coach-built and compact motorhomes and campervans. Giottiline Company has a sales network of more than 100 dealers and service points in Europe.
