= Travco =

Motorhome

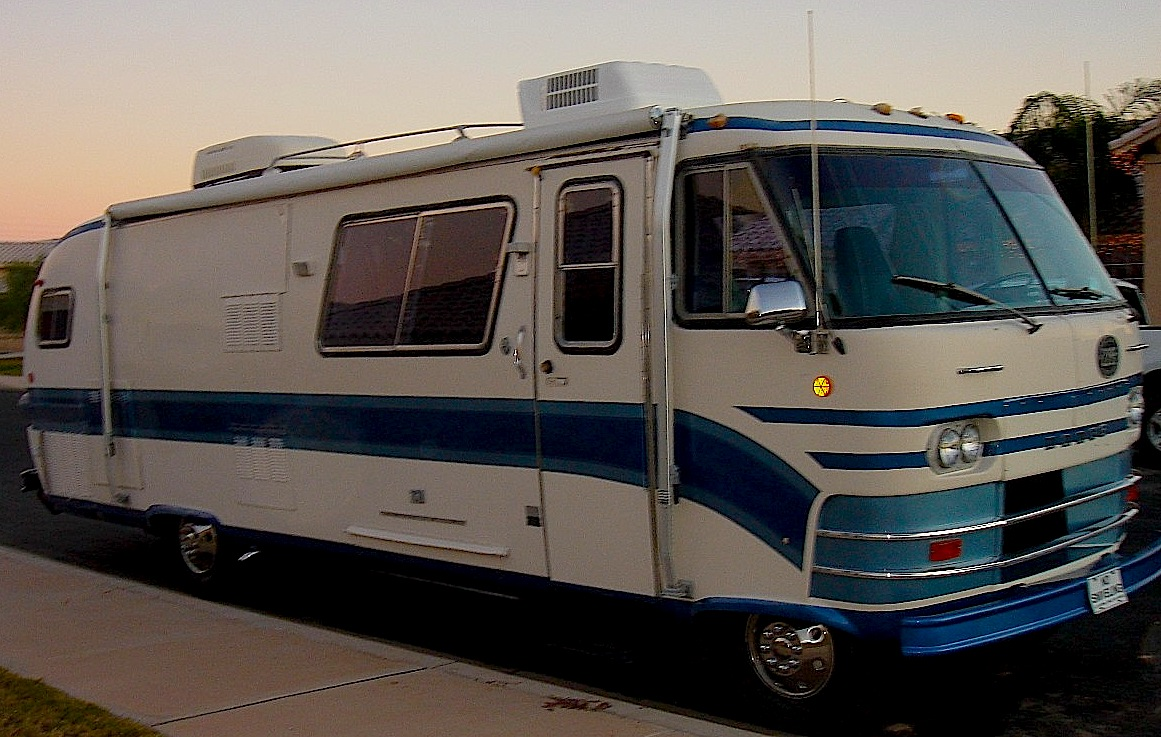
1968 Travco Motorhome

The Travco motorhome was an American aerodynamic Class A recreational vehicle built on a Dodge chassis from 1964 until the late 1980s. The Travco design originally emerged as a 1961 model called the "Dodge Frank Motor Home" and marketed with the assistance of the Chrysler Corporation, with many Travcos being sold with Dodge branding. 131 were produced the first year, with an average price tag of $9000. The Travco/Dodge Motor Home design and fiberglass body were refinements by Ray Frank to the original Frank Motor Home, a conventional box-type design based on the Dodge chassis and built in Brown City, Michigan from 1958 to 1962. Ray Frank, founder of Frank Industries, also coined the term "motorhome" and went on to develop Xplorer Motorhomes. Frank has been inducted into the RV/MH Hall of Fame & Museum (RV/MH Heritage Foundation, Elkhart Indiana) as the father of the motorhome.

Travco enjoyed a large market share of the budding motorhome market. Its success played a part in the demise of more established makes such as the Corvair-powered UltraVan, and opened the market to lower-cost makes such as Winnebago. Travco's use of the Dodge M-series chassis established Dodge as the most popular make of motorhome chassis for twenty years.

Travco offered a variety of lengths and floorplans; its 27-foot model was the most popular.

The Travco Corporation challenged the tax law on RV chassis, which were considered "trucks" and taxed at a higher rate than private motor vehicles. Travco won its case in 1971, and the IRS-accepted motorhomes would be taxed at the lower rate. This was a significant victory that served all manufacturers in the industry.

== History ==
In 1964, Travco Corporation (contraction of "Travelers Company") took control, the windows were enlarged and various other cosmetic modifications were added. The mid-1960s Travco was offered in six color combinations. The styling changed very little from 1964 to 1980 except for a choice of grille designs. Five sizes were offered; the 21-foot 210, 22-foot 220, the 27-foot 270, the 29-foot 290, and the 32-foot 320. Out of the five, the 270 was the best seller, and the best selling color in the 1960s was white with a red band running lengthwise around the center. The popular colors in the 1970s were any shade of earth tone with or without a two-tone. Eventually, the "Atomic Age" design failed to impress most buyers, despite the more modern-looking grille introduced in the mid-1970s. As part of the loan guarantees to the Chrysler Corporation during its financial crisis in the late 1970s, Chrysler was told to abandon the medium duty truck market (including the Dodge Motorhome Chassis) and concentrate on building light trucks; International Harvester was told to do the reverse, and get out of light trucks and concentrate on medium and heavy duty vehicles as part of their agreement with the US federal government. This stopped production of both the very popular Dodge chassis, the 440 ci big-block V8, and contributed to the demise of the Travco, which was identified strongly with the Chrysler Corporation. Other factors, including management changes and extraordinarily high fuel costs and interest rates in the 1979-era contributed to Travco's difficulties. However, the body shells were used by a luxury-RV maker called Foretravel until around 1990.

Travco also offered van conversions called "Family Wagons" as well as class C Minihomes called "Family Wagon", with aluminum sides similar to Winnebago's "Minnie winnie", and a fiberglass version called "L'Esprit".

== Chassis ==
The original Dodge motorhome chassis used for the Travco, and many other makes, was powered by the Chrysler 318 "Polysphere" engine. Refinements were made to the engine to increase durability for heavy-duty use. GVWs could exceed six tons, but the 318 engine with around 200 horsepower could manage to keep up with traffic, and had a top speed of slightly over 70 mph in most configurations. The 318, and later 413 and 440 engines, were mated to the Chrysler Torqueflite 727 transmission; until the 1964 model, these transmissions shared the "pushbutton" selector quadrant used on other Chrysler Corporation vehicles. From 1965 on, the Torqueflite used an instrument panel–mounted selector lever similar to the Corvair Powerglide. All Dodge motorhome chassis engines were specially improved "truck" versions, that operated on regular gasoline, with special durability features such as improved valves and stress-relieved castings and forged crankshafts. The Dodge chassis utilized a live dual rear wheel axle and an "I"-beam front axle suspended on semi-elliptic leaf springs at both ends.

== Interiors ==
Early Travco coach interiors were arguably the most well-made and practical. Upholstery pieces featured simple patterns in durable vinyl. Carpets and interior trim were functional and durable. The mid-70s and the 80s brought twin swivel chairs under a crank-out bunk bed. A dinette table was located across the way, with cabinets above, and the kitchen was fully equipped with not only the expected four-burner range/oven, double-door refrigerator and double sink, but some even came with built-in toasters and coffee pots. Interior fabrics and floor coverings were more ornate. The bathroom was large, and it was fully equipped with marine toilet, sink, and shower. A large closet was across from that. A tiny bedroom with bed, a mirror, and numerous storage areas occupied the rear end of the motorhome.

Over the years, floorplans varied from the luxury 27 foot "Dodge Mahal" in the early 1970s which offered posh comfort intended for just two, to family floor plans sleeping up to ten. The "SightSeer" economy motorhome was a basic, stripped down and shorter model directed at the economy market typified by Winnebago. Sightseer was a conventional box-style motorhome that did not share the distinctive flowing aerodynamic Travco signature body style.
