= Mini Wildgoose =

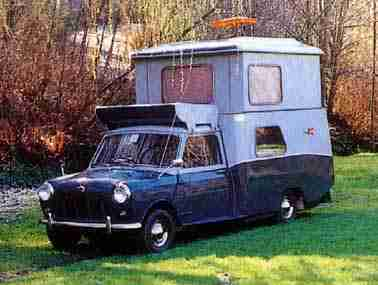
- A Mini Wildgoose

Overview
- Manufacturer: Wildgoose
- Assembly: Worthing, Sussex, England

Body and chassis
- Body style: Campervan
- Layout: FF
- Platform: Mini Mk1 Van

Powertrain
- Engine: 848 cc (52 cu in)

The Mini Wildgoose was a motorhome based on a Mini. It was particularly designed for the "retired couple" and its maker claimed a top speed of 70 mph (112 km/h), although a cruising speed of 50 mph (80 km/h) was more realistic.

A company in Sussex, England, built the Mini Wildgoose in small numbers during the 1960s. The conversion required a BMC Mini van and a kit costing £445, £480 or £601. A completed vehicle could also be ordered.

Conversions were offered between 1963 and 1968, and about 60 vehicles were completed, of which an estimated ten survive. According to Mini's classic vehicle workshop, the number of known survivors is six.

There were three conversions. The two Popular models used a pop-up tent roof, while the Brent Super V.E.B. had a vertically extending body whose telescopic roof section was raised electrically, with a manual crank as a backup, so that the living area had standing headroom.

One surviving Brent Super V.E.B. belongs to the BMW Group Classic collection. Built in 1965, it has serial number 18 and took part in a historic-vehicle rally in 2013.

== Standard equipment ==
With the Mini Wildgoose conversion, four seats were provided in a dinette and a double bed was also accommodated. Equipment included was a table, curtains, cupboards and water carriers.

== Optional extras ==
Supplementary equipment was also available, which can be compared to today's camper experiences, such as:

- Combined luggage rack and spare wheel container
- Extended wing mirrors
- Hammock type bunk
- Undersealing of cab.
