= Sportsmobile =

Sportsmobile is a company that provides custom after market conversions for full size vans. Most vans are fully converted to type B RV motor-homes. The Sportsmobile company was founded in 1961 by Curtis and Charles Borskey and now has three locations: Huntington, Indiana, Austin, Texas and Fresno, California. They are considered one of the oldest van conversion companies in the U.S.

== Company history ==
In 1961 Curtis and Charles Borskey started the Sportsmobile company in El Paso, Texas. After his first successful Sportsmobile, a Volkswagen conversion, Borskey was contracted to install kits into Volkswagen vans by Volkswagen America. One year later Sportsmobile was contracted by Ford to install camper kits in the Lorain, Michigan plant (ref 3). In 1967 rising tariffs on vans and lackluster sales ended their contract with Volkswagen of America. Sportsmobile began selling directly to VW distributors, but soon after the Westfalia, which copied several patented features of the Sportsmobile kit, was developed. Borskey moved to Indiana and contracted out with Travel Equipment Corporation and later to General Engineering Corporation.

In 1976 Borskey opened his first Sportsmobile plant in Huntington, Indiana and began selling units factory direct. The high interest rates and second oil embargo almost led to a closure of the plant in 1980. Sales soon began to pick up and plant foreman, Jim Friermood, convinced Borskey to continue production. In 1984 Borskey opened up a second location in Austin, Texas.

In 1989 Alan Feld convinced Borskey to grant him a license as a Sportsmobile manufacturer. Sportsmobile West originally opened up outside of San Diego in a 2,000-square-foot shop and eventually moved to Fresno, California into a 66,000-square-foot facility in 2000.

On September 1, 2020, Sportsmobile West ended its licensing agreement with Sportsmobile and became Field Van

== Popularity ==
Brian Lopes, professional mountain bike racer, designed his own bike hauler with Sportsmobile called the “Lopes 55”. It is now one of his “signature” products. It was a showcased vehicle in the 2006 L.A. Auto Show.

Jimmy Buffett also owns several Sportsmobiles. He has dubbed one his “Green Tomato”, a green surf van converted to run on used cooking oil. The “Green Tomato” was even incorporated into one of Margaritaville's shirt designs.

Sportsmobile was also featured in the show Boys Toys on WealthTV. It “won” the episode defeating the other featured cars, an Ariel Atom, a Ferrari FF, Rally Fighter & Ultimate GTR.
