= Bailey of Bristol =

British manufacturer of leisure vehicles

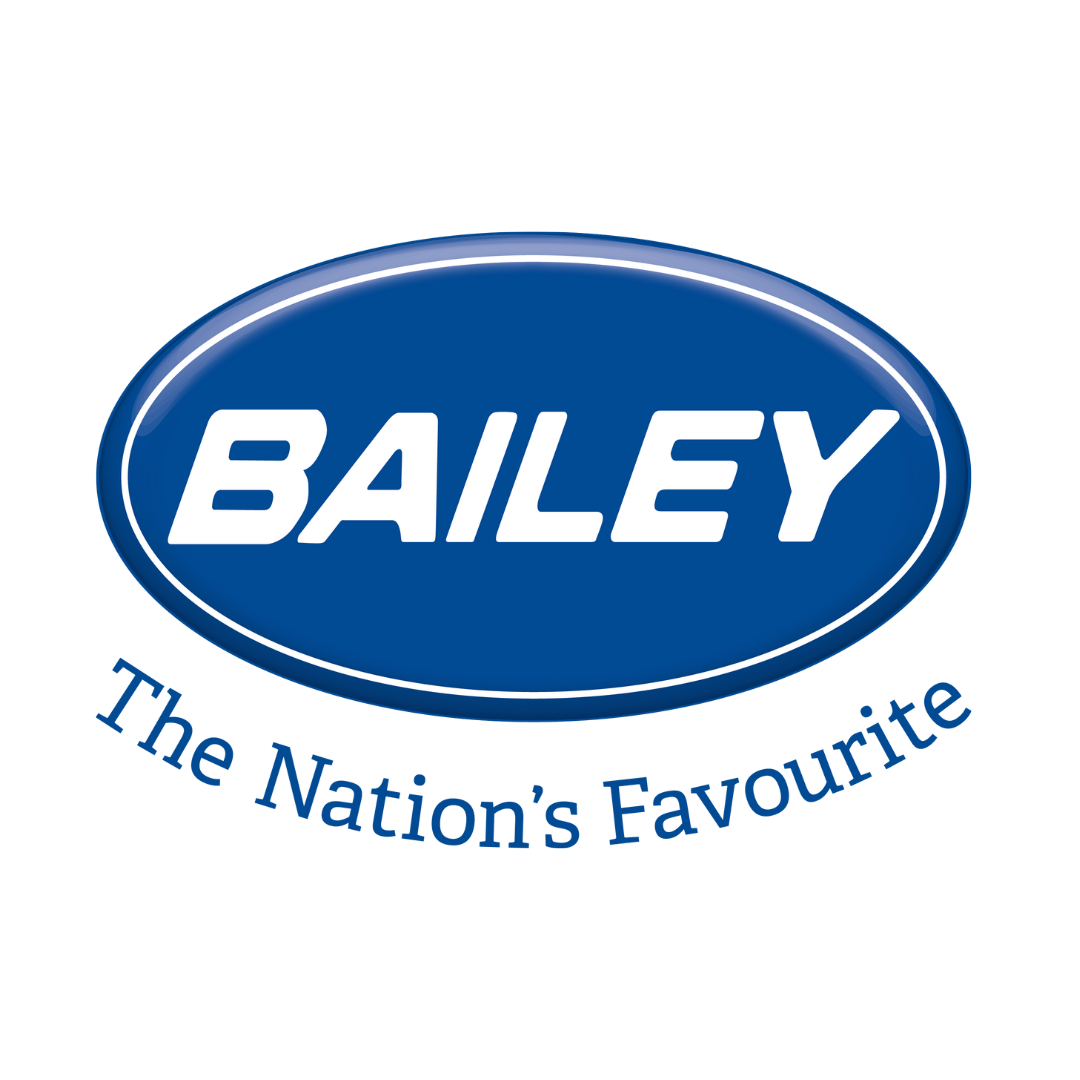
- Industry: Automotive
- Founded: 1948; 78 years ago in Bristol, United Kingdom
- Founder: Martin Bailey
- Headquarters: Bristol, United Kingdom
- Area served: United Kingdom, Turkey, New Zealand and South Korea
- Products: Caravans, motorhomes and campervans
- Number of employees: 650
- Website: www.baileyofbristol.co.uk

Bailey of Bristol is a British manufacturer of leisure vehicles, including touring caravans, motorhomes and campervans.

Bailey of Bristol was founded in Bristol, England, in 1948. The company's main manufacturing plant is located at South Liberty Lane in South Bristol. The company also operates the Large Panel Laminating Plant in Clevedon, North Somerset, which produces the caravan and motorhome body shell panels. In addition, its subsidiary business, PRIMA Leisure, which is located in North Bristol, manufactures parts for Bailey vehicles as well as commercial leisure accessories.

== History ==
=== Company beginning (1948) ===
Bailey of Bristol was founded by Martin Bailey, who built the first Bailey caravan in his South Bristol garage in 1947, selling it at Ashton Gate market for £200.

A year later in 1948, F.G Bailey Ltd was formed and began production. After the Second World War, when caravan popularity increased due to its usage as a form of temporary accommodation, Bailey released a range of models.

=== 1950-2000 ===
In the 1950s, Bailey moved to South Liberty Lane.

In 1977, Patrick and Stephen Howard purchased the company. The company remains under the ownership of the Howard family.

By the early 1980s, Bailey had purchased the sections of industrial land on either side of the original South Liberty Lane site.

During the 1980s, the company began producing the Pageant and Senator ranges.

=== 2000-2023 ===
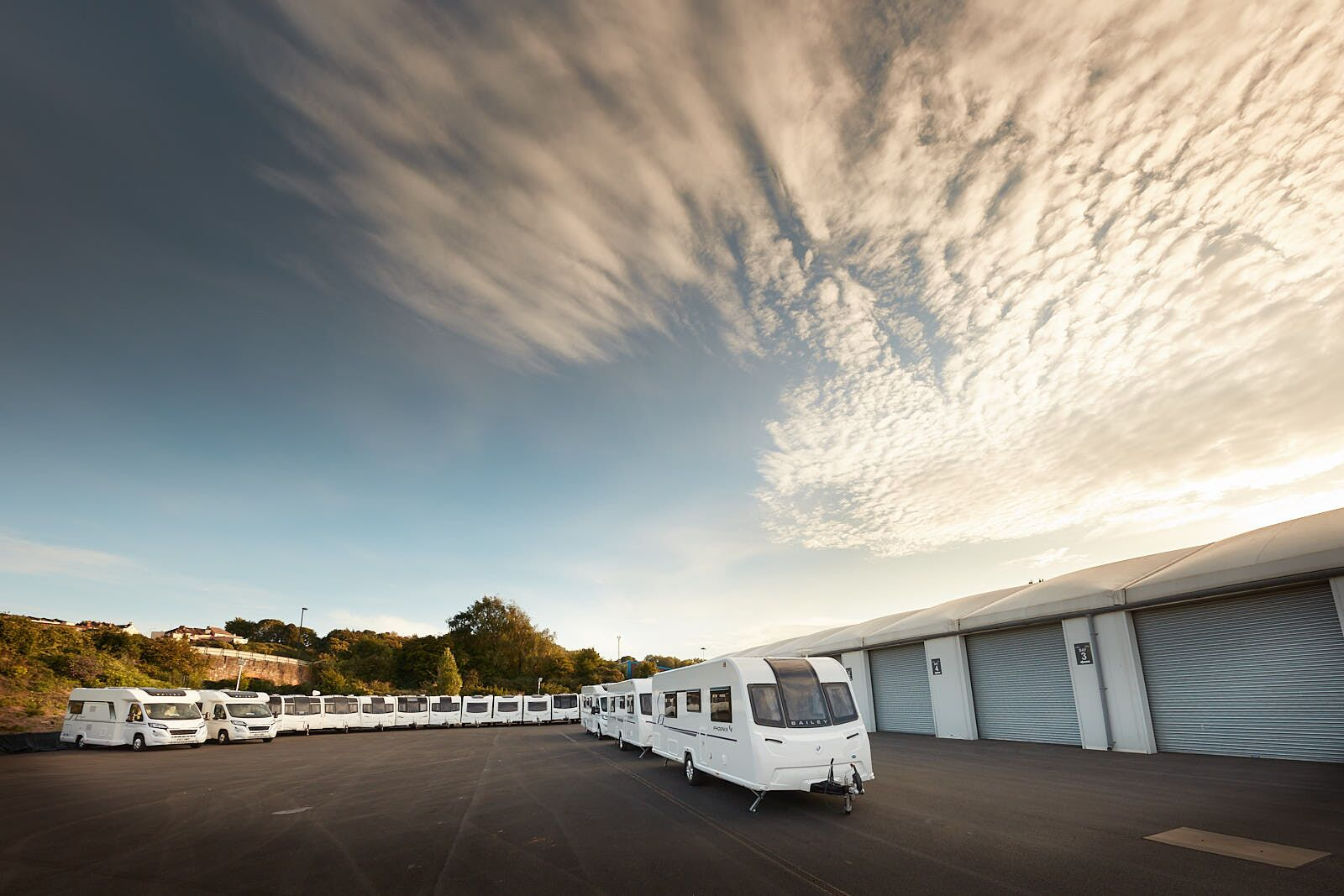
Bailey of Bristol's production facility

During the recession in the mid-2000s, Bailey responded to the event by expanding its production facility and focusing on product diversification.

In 2011, the first Bailey motorhome was launched – the Approach SE.

In 2012, as part of her Diamond Jubilee Tour, Her Late Majesty the Queen Elizabeth II and the Duke of Edinburgh visited Bailey of Bristol and toured the factory.

In 2016, Bailey Parts & Accessories registered as a separate company and moved from the South Liberty Lane site to its own premises just off of the M4/M5 Interchange in North Bristol. In 2019, Bailey Parts & Accessories changed its name to PRIMA Leisure.

In the same year, Bailey opened its new Replenishment Centre on the South Liberty Lane site along with a Large Panel Laminating Plant at Clevedon.

In 2023, Bailey launched its first campervan range, the Endeavour.
