= Xplorer Motorhomes =

American motorhomes (RVs)

Xplorer Motorhome

Overview
- Manufacturer: Xplorer Motor Homes (formerly Frank Industries)
- Production: 1967–present
- Assembly: Elkhart, Indiana, U.S.
- Designer: Ray Frank

Body and chassis
- Class: Class B motorhome (Camper van)
- Body style: Van-based motorhome with fiberglass extensions
- Layout: Front-engine, rear-wheel drive
- Platform: Dodge B series van (original)
- Related: Travco Motorhome

Chronology
- Predecessor: Frank Motor Home (Travco)

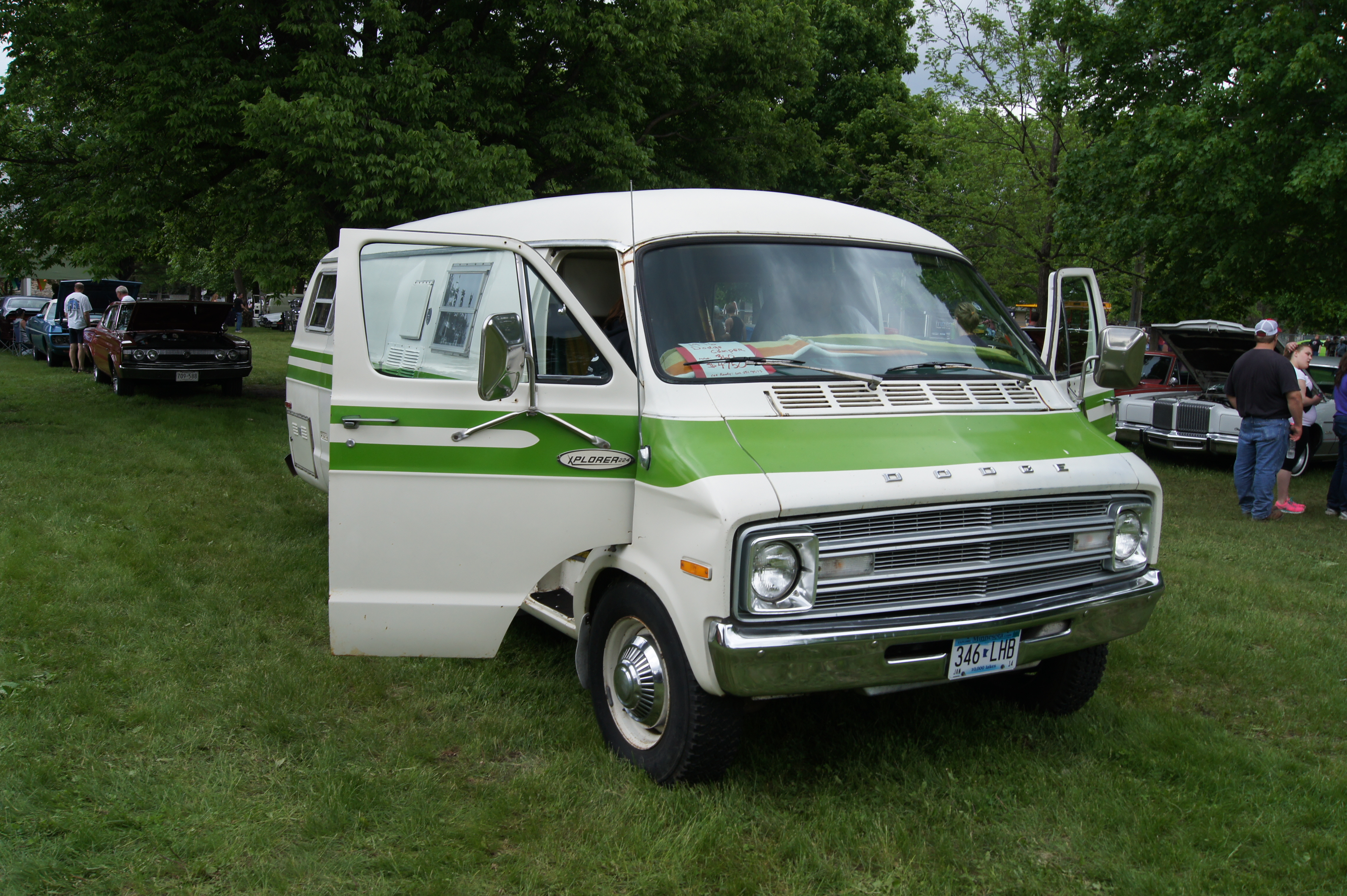
A 1976 Dodge B-Series Tradesman Xplorer RV at a Mopars in the Park car show in Fairgrounds, Minnesota.

Xplorer Motorhomes are small Class B motorhomes built on a van chassis. It was the designer and builder of the first production motorhome. Ray Frank, the creator of the Travco Motorhome, saw his Frank Industries sold and renamed Travco in the early sixties. He began Xplorer Motor Homes in 1967, seeing a market for small, garageable motorhomes based on Dodge vans. The roofs and back walls were removed and extended with fiberglass domes, and some models had dropped floor areas that created (with the domed roof) six feet or more of standing room.

In 2004, Xplorer Motorhomes was sold to Bob Helvie. The company is based in Elkhart, Indiana.
