= Tonke (company) =

Tonke is a manufacturer of motorhomes located in Wagenberg, Netherlands. It was founded by Maarten van Soest in 2006. Tonke's motorhomes are a new version of the truck campers, a well known phenomenon in Northern America. The cabin can be lifted from the vehicle manually or by means of a hydraulic lifting mechanism. The styling of the Tonke can be seen as retro-design as it refers to historic wooden sailing yachts and gypsy carriages. Tonke manufactures 4 standard models (the Explorer Series and the Fieldsleeper Series).
