= Mauck Special Vehicles =

Bus-like vehicle manufacturer

Mauck Specialty Vehicles was a builder of custom bus-like vehicles headquartered in Worthington, Ohio, United States, created by Andy Mauck. It was located near the headquarters of Worthington Industries, run by John McConnell, who provided the early financing to get the company started. Mauck had previously sold custom firetrucks for a company called Sutphens.

The formal vehicle name was the Mauck MSV 1120s, where the first "1" stood for the model number, the "12" stood for the wheelbase, and the "0" was intended to refer to option packages. The "s" had no meaning.

Mauck built vehicles in association with Custom Coach Corporation of Columbus, Ohio. Celebrities such as Alan Jackson and George Foreman were among those who purchased MSV's as customized after-market vehicles. They had an expensive price tag—often in excess of $200,000—which limited the number of orders. In June 1998 the company was purchased by a group of investors and became known as Advanced Bus Industries.

Over 100 units were built between 1996 and 1999. Many were shipped overseas; others were put into service as micro-buses running municipal routes, often with handicapped access. Cities with MSV's in service included Dayton, Ohio, Columbus, Ohio, and San Diego, CA. Those used as commercial buses were typically of the 30-foot (9.1 m) variety, whereas personal vehicles were 25 feet (7.6 m). The MSV was just under 8 feet (2.4 m) tall (with a low-floor configuration that permitted nearly 6.5 feet (2.0 m) of headroom), and 8 feet (2.4 m) wide. Mileage averaged about 10 mpg depending on engine selected, which provided adequate range given the standard 35-gallon tank.

== Construction ==
The MSV was hand-assembled for some 600-hours per unit, constructed of fiberglass panels and a carbon steel frame. Several frames in the later years were constructed in stainless steel. Engine options included a GM 454 cubic-inch 8-cylinder (7.4 L) Vortec mated to a GM 4L80E heavy-duty truck transmission, or Cummins 6-cylinder 360 cubic-inch (5.9 L) diesel engine mated to an Allison heavy-duty truck transmission. MSV's utilized air suspension systems, and the vehicle sported gull-wing doors.

In order to keep costs in line, Mauck designed his bus with many off-the-shelf parts sourced from GM, Ford and others. For instance, in addition to having a GM powerplant, MSV's also had GM suspension and brake components, wiring harnesses and access hardware. The rear-end was a Ford 9" with a custom-designed Currie Enterprises differential. Headlights were lifted from the Ford Aeromax 18-wheeler line, while taillights came from Grand Cherokees of the era, and driving lights from the Dodge Viper. Windshield wipers were from a Toyota Previa. In all, hundreds of parts were 'donated' from other makes and models. Still, in addition to 37 custom exterior fiberglass panels and 13 oversized panes of laminated glass, another 2,700 unique parts were required. GVWR was typically 13,500 pounds, empty weight was generally under 10,000 pounds, though this did vary depending on options and year.

== Amenities ==
Typically, MSV's came with dual climate controls, power windows, power door locks, power brakes, power steering, heated power mirrors, cruise control, a reverse camera, and a Street Pilot GPS. A myriad of other creature comforts could be added, including limo-style seating, microwave ovens, coffee-makers, and even a full marine-style bathroom. Quite a few also had satellite TV domes, moon-roofs and onboard generators.

== Photo links ==
- Photos of the MSV

== Sources ==
- FMCA Magazine
- 1999 Mauck Special Vehicles
- Car & Driver Magazine, September, 1997
