= Coachman Caravans =

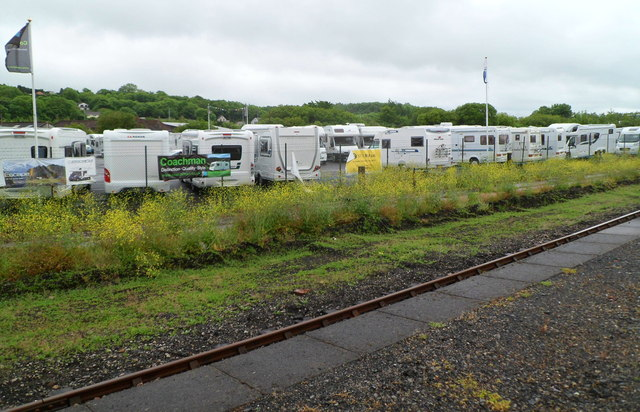
- Company type: Private
- Founded: 1986
- Founder: Jim Hibbs & George Kemp
- Headquarters: Kingston upon Hull, United Kingdom
- Number of locations: United Kingdom, Australia, New Zealand, China and South Korea.
- Key people: Jim Hibbs
- Products: Caravans
- Number of employees: 167
- Parent: Kabe AB
- Website: https://www.coachman.co.uk/

Coachman Caravans Company Limited was set up in 1986 on a green-field site at its current manufacturing base on the Sutton Fields Industrial Estate in Hull. The company was set up to produce touring caravans, vehicles equipped for living in, typically towed by a car and used for holidays and also known as a travel trailer in the United States.

The company was founded by Jim Hibbs and George Kemp, two former directors of a leading motorhome manufacturer. Coachman also recently appointed a new managing director, Martin Henderson, former Sales and marketing director at The Explorer Group.

In the summer of 1997, the company was taken over by the Explorer Group Limited of Consett in County Durham. Under the new ownership the company's fortunes flourished and the directors organised a management buy-out in the Autumn of 2001, returning the Company into the ownership of four Hull families.

In 2013, Coachman Caravans ventured into exporting caravans to Australia and New Zealand. In 1994, the company exported to the Benelux countries of the Netherlands and Belgium.

Coachman Caravans has a formal apprenticeship programme, where they are keen to pass skills down to the next generation.

Coachman was successful in Caravan's 2013 awards and won three awards including the Caravan of the Year for the Coachman Pastiche 525/4.

In 2014 and 2015 the company won more awards from both Practical Caravan and Caravan Awards including the "Best Family Caravan" for two years in a row. Following on from this success with their 2016 season collection Coachman has won 4 awards from The Caravan Design Awards and "Best Mid Range" from Scottish Caravanner.

In July 2018, the Swedish caravan manufacturer KABE AB acquired 21.5% of Coachman. On 19 February 2021, KABE AB acquired the remaining 78.5% shares of the company.

Coachman returned in 2024, working with many established motorhome brands, they produced their very first A-Class motorhome.
