= Jurgens Ci Caravans =

South African caravan manufacturer

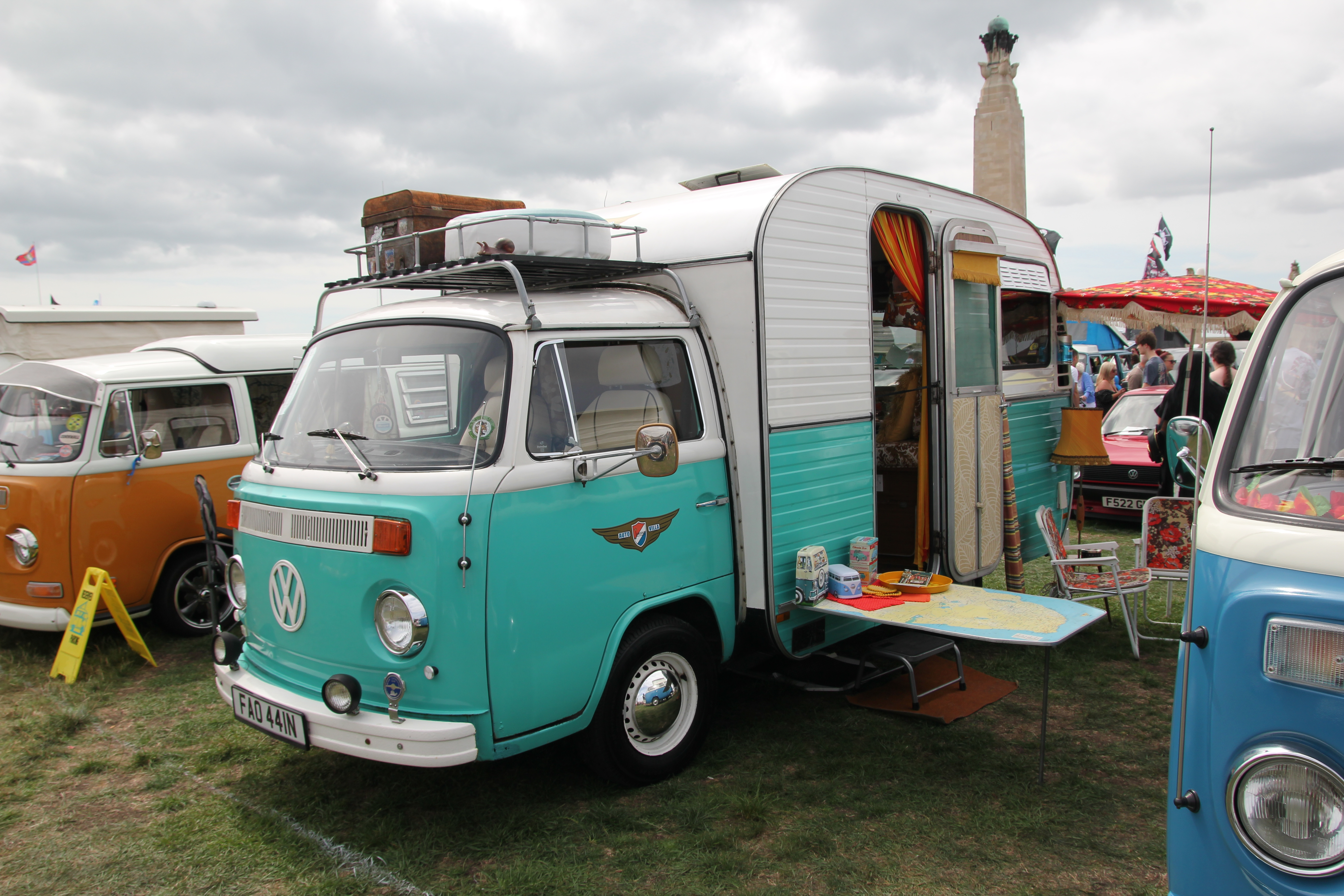
1974 VW Jurgens Autovilla

Jurgens Ci Caravans Ltd, founded in 1952, was South Africa’s oldest and largest caravan manufacturer. The company operated from a head office in Ga-Rankuwa, north of Pretoria, Gauteng, and had a canvas division in New Germany, KwaZulu-Natal. The company was founded in Germiston in 1952 by Geert Jurgens and his sons, Dirk and Rieks, who emigrated to South Africa from the Netherlands in 1950.

Over a history spanning 60 years, the company helped to drive South Africa’s domestic tourism market and had responded to changing market needs by adding add pop-tops, off-road caravans, motorhomes, truck bodies, luggage trailers, canvas products and off-road trailers to its product range.

The company was a wholly owned subsidiary of Imperial Holdings Ltd. Jurgens provided employment for 970 in South Africa and had 70 employees in Australia.

Jurgens Ci had a dealer network in South Africa and Namibia, and exported units to Australia, the Netherlands and New Zealand. Jurgens also had a production facility in Melbourne, Australia.
