= Boles Aero =

American brand of trailers, 1946–1980

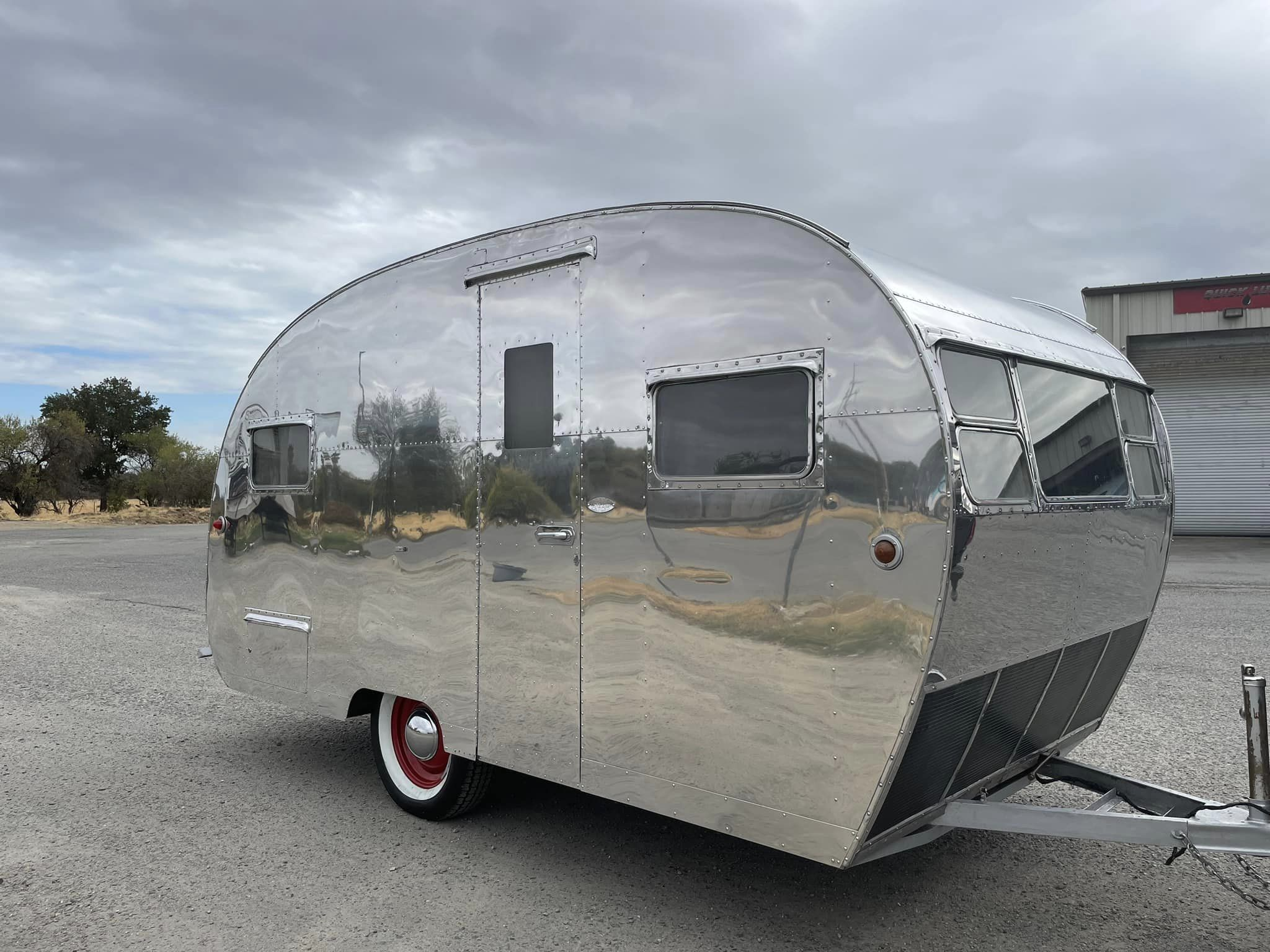
Curb side view of an original 1949 Boles Aero Model 14

Boles Manufacturing produced the Boles Aero brand of aluminum recreational travel trailers in Southern California from 1946 to 1980. Boles Aero trailers featured aircraft style, riveted semi-monocoque aluminum construction, similar to Airstream's line of trailers. In contrast, most other camping trailers of the era were of wood frame construction, covered by a non-structural aluminum skin. Boles Aero aluminum travel trailers were central to the post-war recreational vehicle culture, the quintessential "canned ham" trailer of the mid-century American highway. Boles Manufacturing built and sold over 18,000 trailers between 1946 and 1980.

== Founding ==
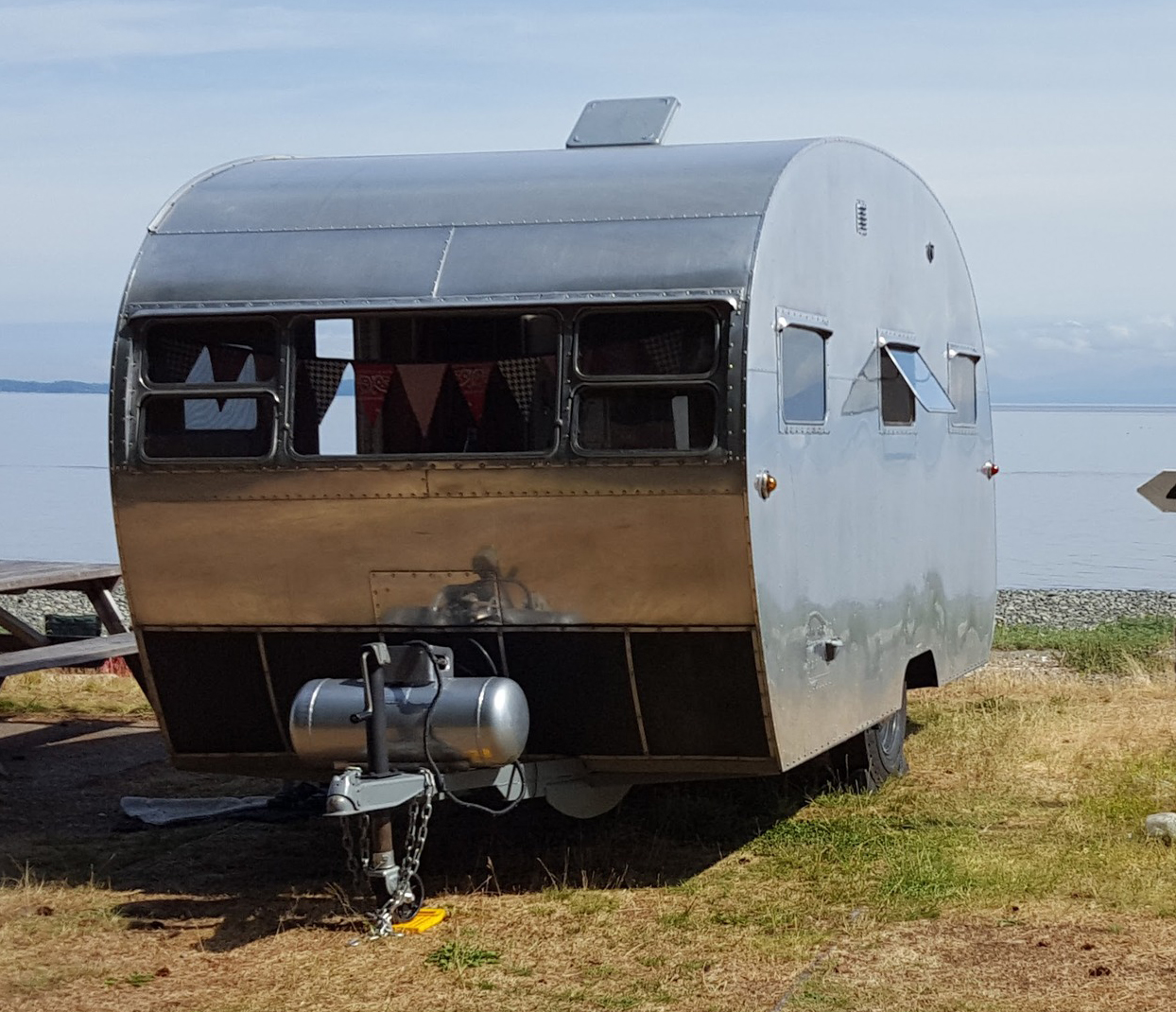
Street side view of an original 1949 Boles Aero model 14

Founder Donald R. Boles learned the basics of aluminum aircraft construction while working as a tool and die apprentice at Lockheed Corporation's Burbank aircraft factory from 1939 to 1942. He enlisted in the Navy in 1943. Stationed at Norman, Oklahoma, he could not find suitable housing for his wife and three children so he purchased a used 8 m (27 ft) travel trailer in which the Boles family lived for the duration of the war.

Released from the Navy after V-J Day, Don and his family enjoyed a cross country vacation towing the trailer home to California. Upon arrival they parked it in the driveway with a "For Sale" sign and were surprised when the trailer sold immediately for a profit. Several more hopeful buyers arrived after the sale and Don realized there was solid demand for travel trailers among the war weary population. Inspired, he began designing a sturdy travel trailer with riveted aluminum construction, based upon his aircraft experience at Lockheed.

Don built his first trailer in the family's single car garage, using money borrowed from his father. The tiny garage dictated that the first trailer had to be less than 10 feet in length. For a brief period while the first trailer was under construction one of Don's friends joined him in the business and they used the brand name "Roadrunner". However, the friend backed out as start up costs mounted. Don re-assumed full control and changed the company name to "Boles Manufacturing", renaming the trailer the "Boles Aero". The first "Boles Aero" trailer completed sold immediately for the asking price of $675.

== The birth of Boles Manufacturing ==
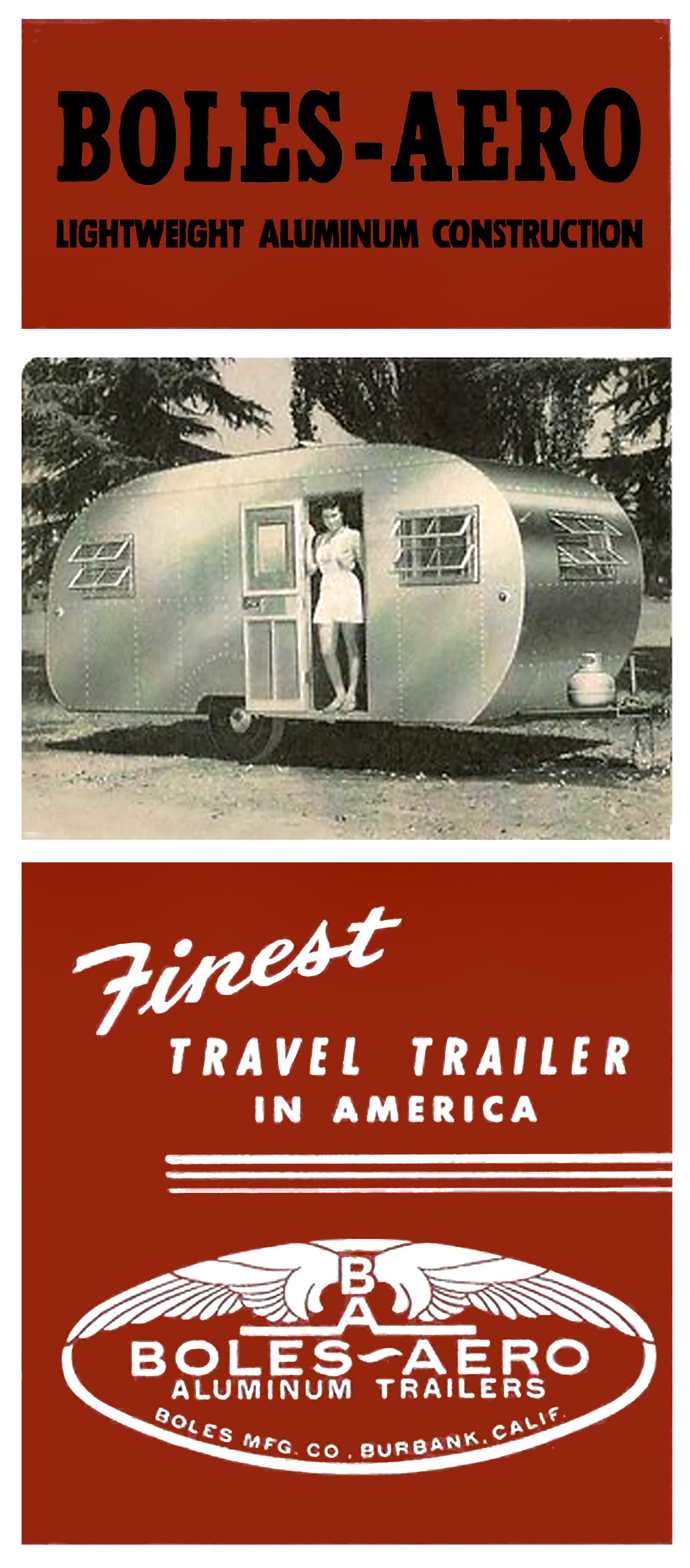
1949 Boles Aero brochure cover art

Aware that growth demanded a proper manufacturing facility, Don purchased a commercial property in Burbank and began construction of a small factory in 1946. He continued to produce initial trailers in his garage. Subsequent trailers sold just as rapidly as the very first. One of the company's initial orders came from a friend who wanted 10 trailers built to a 3.7 m (12 ft) long design. The order had to wait until the factory was complete due to the size limitations of Boles' small garage. Don's wife Jeanette served as Vice President and secretary of the fledgling company.

== Late 1940's to 1950's: travel trailers in high demand ==
The immediate postwar period saw explosive growth in travel related industries and several new manufacturers of travel trailers sprang up in Southern California. With the factory complete, Boles Aero production accelerated quickly as word got out that the trailers were well made and very functional. By the end of 1946 over 300 trailers had been built and sold.

By 1947 Boles Manufacturing produced four different model trailers in 3.0, 3.7, 4.3 and 4.9 m (10, 12, 14 and 16 ft) lengths. The model length referred to the body only, as the trailers were 0.76 to 0.91 m (2.5 to 3 ft) longer overall when including the hitch. Originally Douglas fir paneling was used on the interiors, but in 1948 this gave way to birch. Boles soon expanded the line to include wider "park" models that were intended to be semi-permanent homes in trailer parks vs. road friendly travel trailers.

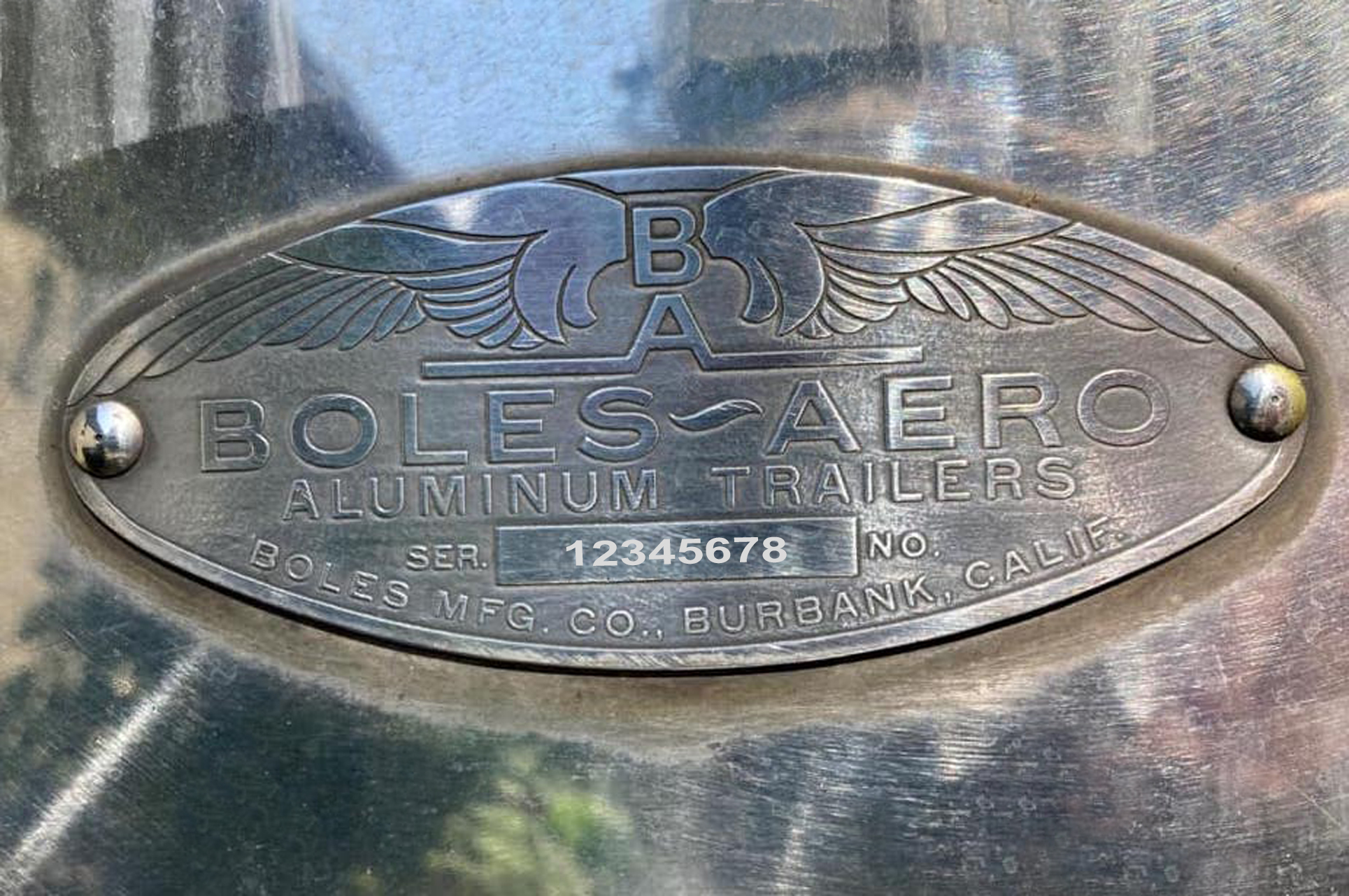
From 1946 to 1952 Boles Manufacturing identified individual trailers with data plates such as this.

As each year passed trailer models with longer and longer body designs were added. By 1952 they discontinued the 3.0 m (10 ft) model. That same year they began naming the trailers after California towns, the 3.7 m (12 ft) "Malibu", 4.3 m (14 ft) "Monterey", 4.9 m (16 ft) "Mira Mar", and the 5.5 m (18 ft) "Montecito". Boles was one of the first trailer manufacturers to provide a service facility at the Burbank factory.

Early Boles Aero trailers had two manufacturer data plates. One plate was mounted adjacent to the entry door, while a second data plate was located on the rear of the trailer, just above the license plate. The trailer's individual serial number was stamped on these data plates until 1952, after which the trailer model name was added in its place. From 1952 the serial numbers are found stamped on the frame. Hemmings magazine described the early Boles Aero trailers as both lightweight and aesthetically pleasing, remarking "some people count them among the most beautiful trailers ever made".

By the late 50's models up to 35 feet long were being produced. Boles resisted the urge to increase profit margins by reducing build quality, setting an industry standard for solid construction.

== 1960's: Industry leader ==
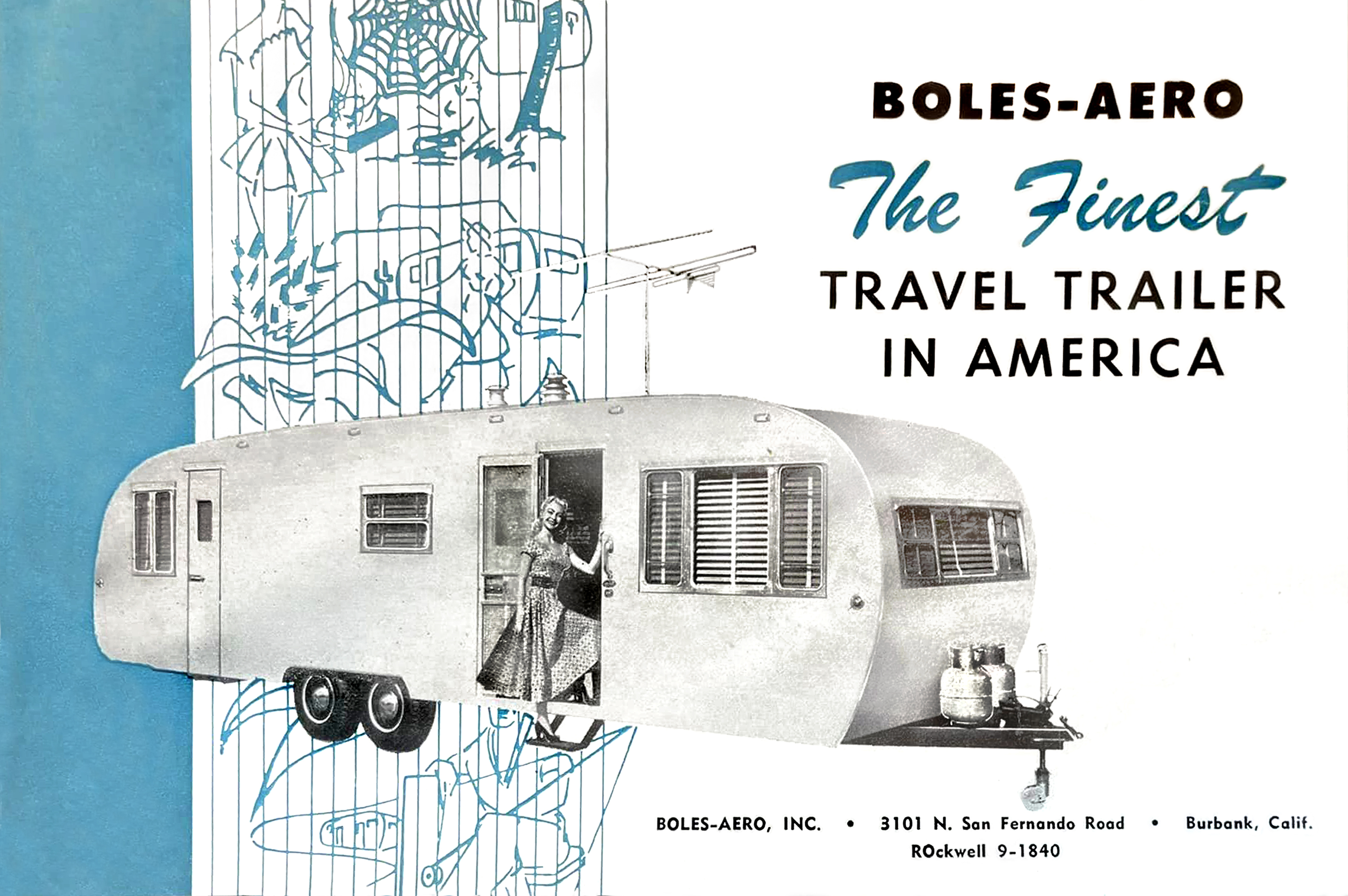
1953 Boles Aero Brochure cover art

By the 1960's Boles Aero was one of the top trailer brands on the West Coast, with production and sales facilities in Burbank, California and Elkhart, Indiana. They continued to evolve their design, treating the exterior panels of later trailers with gold anodizing to give them both a distinctive look and robust corrosion protection.

Don Boles helped start an annual consumer rally and trailer show at Dodger stadium in the late 1950's and early 60's and became active in the Trailer Coach Association, serving on the board of directors for many years. Several of his designs became industry standards, including flush vent covers for furnaces and recessed water fillers.

During the Vietnam War Boles Manufacturing built lightweight mobile photo, medical, and dental labs that could be shipped overseas by large cargo aircraft.

== 1970's and retirement ==
Strong sales of Boles Aero trailers continued throughout the 1970's, but never reached the levels of competitors such as Airstream. Don and Jeanette Boles were content to remain a niche provider of quality trailers. They decided to retire in 1980 and closed the business after 34 years in operation.

== Legacy ==
Boles Aero had lower sales volumes than other aluminum trailers of the day, and its owners began to meet at brand-specific trailer rallies in the 1990s and early 2000s. Don and Jeanette attended these events frequently, answered questions, shared manufacturing details from old business records, and in some cases autographed trailer interiors. Don was elected to the RV/MH Hall of Fame in 2005, and died in 2009. Boles Aero travel trailers continue to generate interest and command high resale values in the 21st century.
