= Auto-Sleepers =

English campervan manufacturer

Auto-Sleepers Group Limited
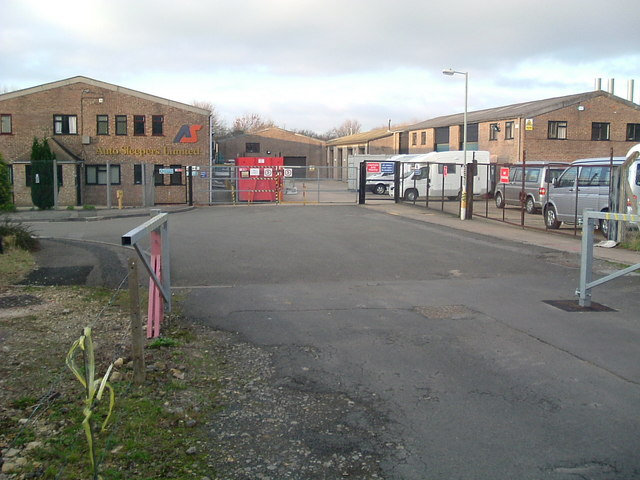
- Autosleepers factory
- Trade name: Auto-Sleepers
- Type: Private company
- Industry: Recreational vehicles
- Founded: 1961
- Founder: Trevelyan family
- Headquarters: Broadway, Worcestershire, England
- Area served: United Kingdom; Europe
- Owner: Geoff Scott; Mike Crouch
- Parent: Trigano Group Ltd
- Website: auto-sleepers.com

Auto-Sleepers Group Limited, trading as Auto-Sleepers (also Auto-sleeper), is an English manufacturer of campervan motorhomes, based in Willersey, a small village near Broadway, Worcestershire.

== History ==
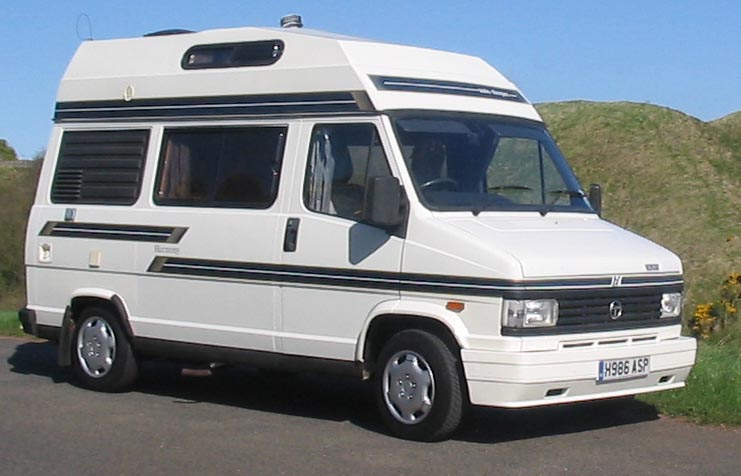
1991 Auto-Sleepers Harmony on a Talbot Express chassis

In 1961, the Trevelyan family and their two young sons, built their own motorhome based on a Morris Commercial J2 van, which they took on holiday to the South of France. On return they converted an Austin van, which attracted five orders from Henlys in Bristol. Going into business with local builder Bob Halling, the first retail products were produced.

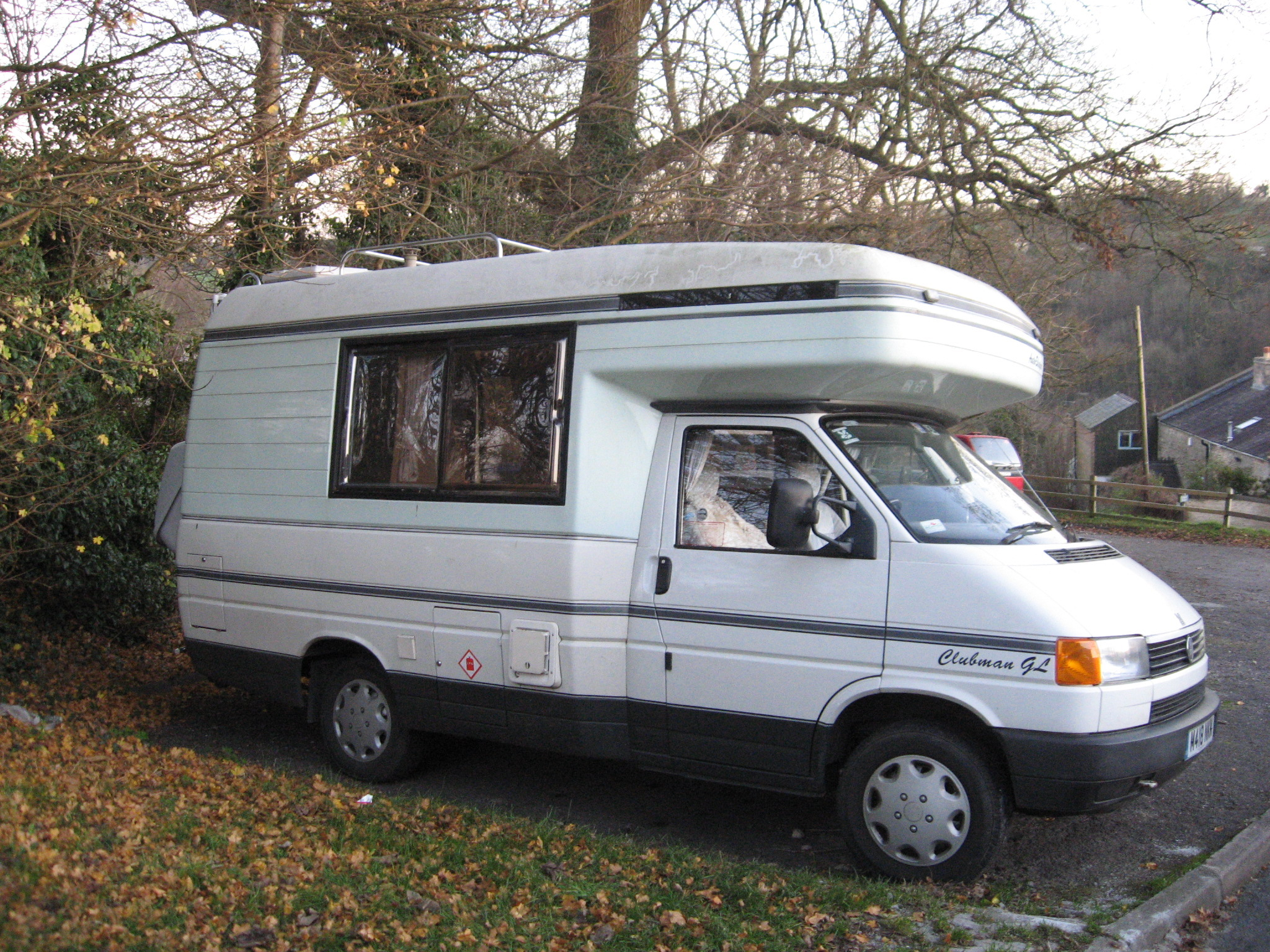
Auto-Sleepers clamshell design, based on a Volkswagen Transporter (T4) chassis

Auto-Sleepers core product developed through the adoption of the successful monocoque body, a two-piece clamshell glass-fibre unit which gave the living unit strength and a lack of edge joints, which on a traditional sandwich construction produce a weaker body which is prone to leaking.

The company developed rapidly and quickly became a product market leader in the United Kingdom, as well as exporting its vehicles to France, Belgium, the Netherlands, Luxembourg, Germany, Switzerland, New Zealand, Australia and Japan

The Trevelyan family sold the business in 1997 to Steven Riley and Bill Cook, whilst retaining a small shareholding themselves. In 2000 the company was sold to Ian Capes and Stuart Johnson, whose Marquis company in 2005 was acquired by the Italian motorhome manufacturing company SEA Group.

== Present ==
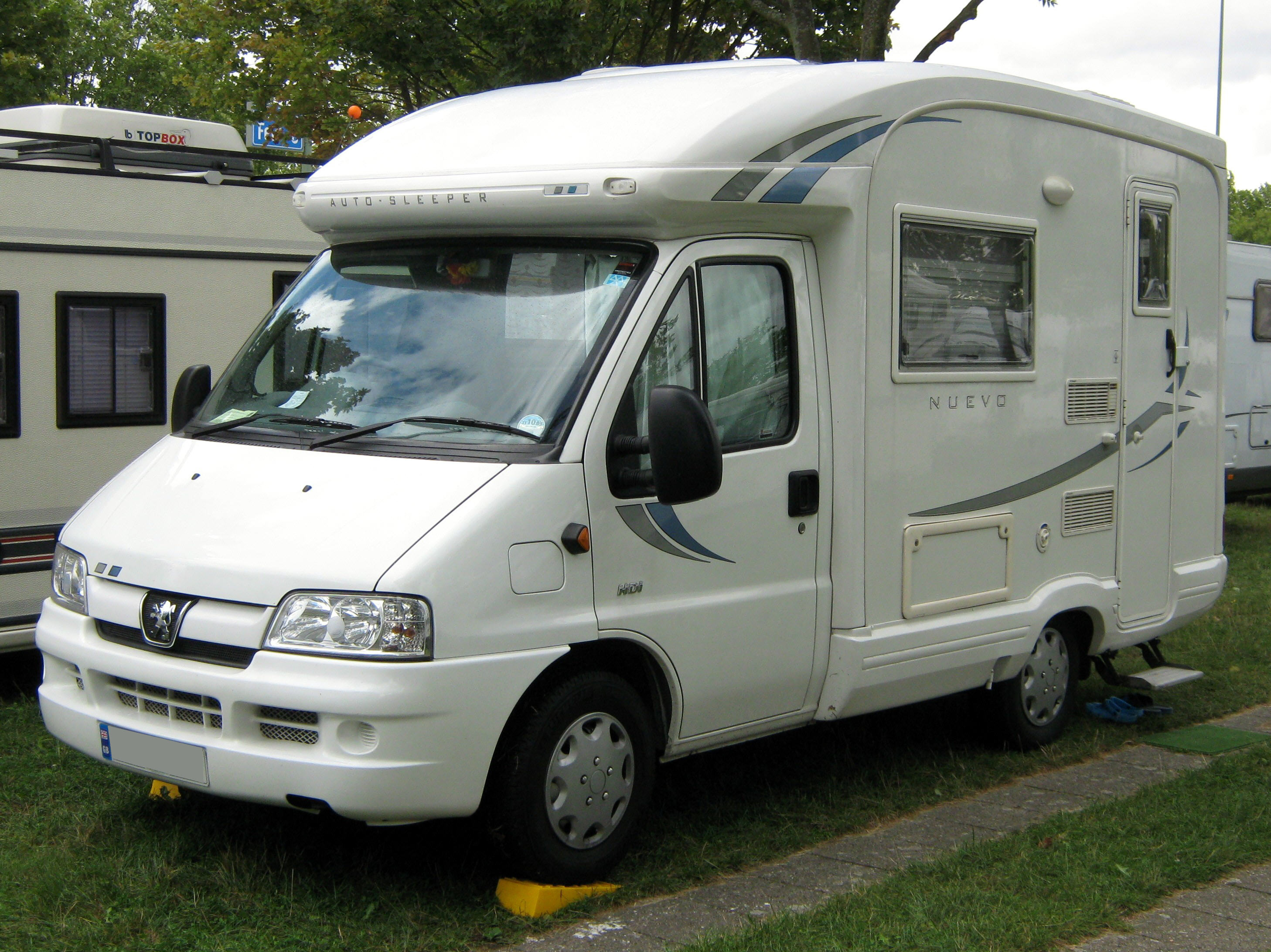
Modern Auto-Sleepers Nuevo based on a Peugeot Boxer chassis

Like most British based motorcaravan manufacturers, its vehicles are based on van chassis supplied by major motor manufacturers, including the Peugeot Boxer and Mercedes-Benz Sprinter; the Ford Transit based conversions were dropped in 2010, and the Volkswagen LT conversions for model year 2017. The Service Centre is based in Willersey, near Broadway, Worcestershire, formerly managed by last family member involved with the business, Charles Trevelyan.

In June 2009, existing directors Geoff Scott and Mike Crouch acquired 100% of the shareholding via their company Trigano Group - the UK's largest dealer network of motorhomes, trading under the Marquis brand - returning Auto Sleeper into British private ownership.
