= Shasta travel trailers =

Shasta travel trailers were recreational vehicles originally built between 1941 and 2004. Founded by industry pioneer Robert Gray, the firm was originally situated in a small factory in Los Angeles, California to provide housing for members of the US Armed Forces. With the growth in sales over the following 30 years, the "home" factory in L.A. moved to three steadily larger facilities in Southern California, in addition to six other factories established across the country to better serve the regional markets. At the time of its purchase by the W.R. Grace Company in 1972, Shasta was the largest seller of recreational vehicles in the United States (also including motorhomes in its inventory). Coachmen Industries, Inc. bought the firm from Grace in 1976.

The low price of Shastas made them a favorite with campers all over the United States.

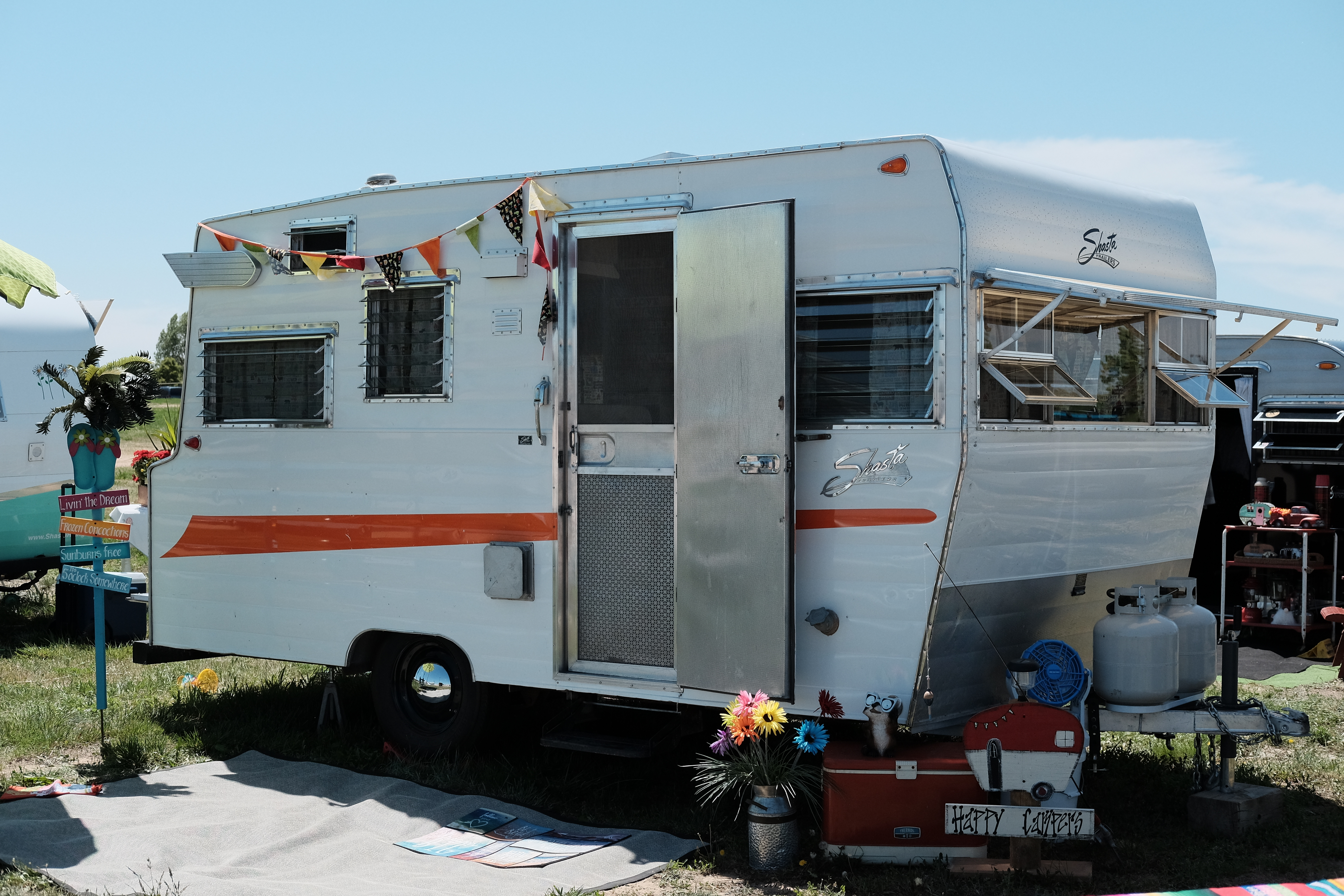
A 1966 Shasta travel trailer at a vintage camper trailer rally in Gillette, Wyoming

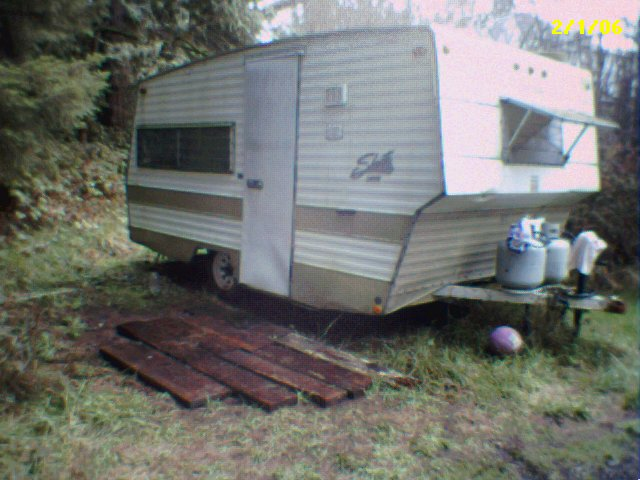
Shasta Loflyte trailer, built in 1971, currently located at Lost Valley Educational Center

The "wings" on the rear sides were a visible identifier from 1958 and beyond. The name was sold to Coachmen Industries. Coachmen marketed Shasta branded travel trailers until 2004. Only vintage trailers were available until 2008 when the brand was reintroduced complete with its identifying wings. The new trailers have updated art deco interiors and are all electric. Their features include stainless steel microwaves, stainless steel sinks and mini blinds, hot plate cooktops, wet baths and entertainment features - including a 19" LCD television.

In 2010, Shasta RV re-emerged as a division of Forest River Inc. In March 2012, Mark Lucas became the president and general manager of Shasta RV. The company has grown to include a sales office, multiple production facilities and a finished goods staging area.

In 2015, Lucas introduced the 1961 Airflyte re-issue with production limited to 1,941 units, honoring the company's first year in business. Re-issues were available in 16-foot and 19-foot floorplans and in three two-tone colors: Matador Red, Seafoam Green and Butternut Yellow, all with Polo White. These models included the signature "Z" stripe and the iconic wings. However, Shasta ended up recalling 1,736 of the re-issued Trailers for window and tire issues.

Shasta RV currently builds the Oasis (No Relation to the vintage brand called Oasis in the late 50's-60's), Revere and Flyte lines of travel trailers and the Phoenix line of fifth wheel travel trailers.
