= Millennium Luxury Coaches =

Bus manufacturing company

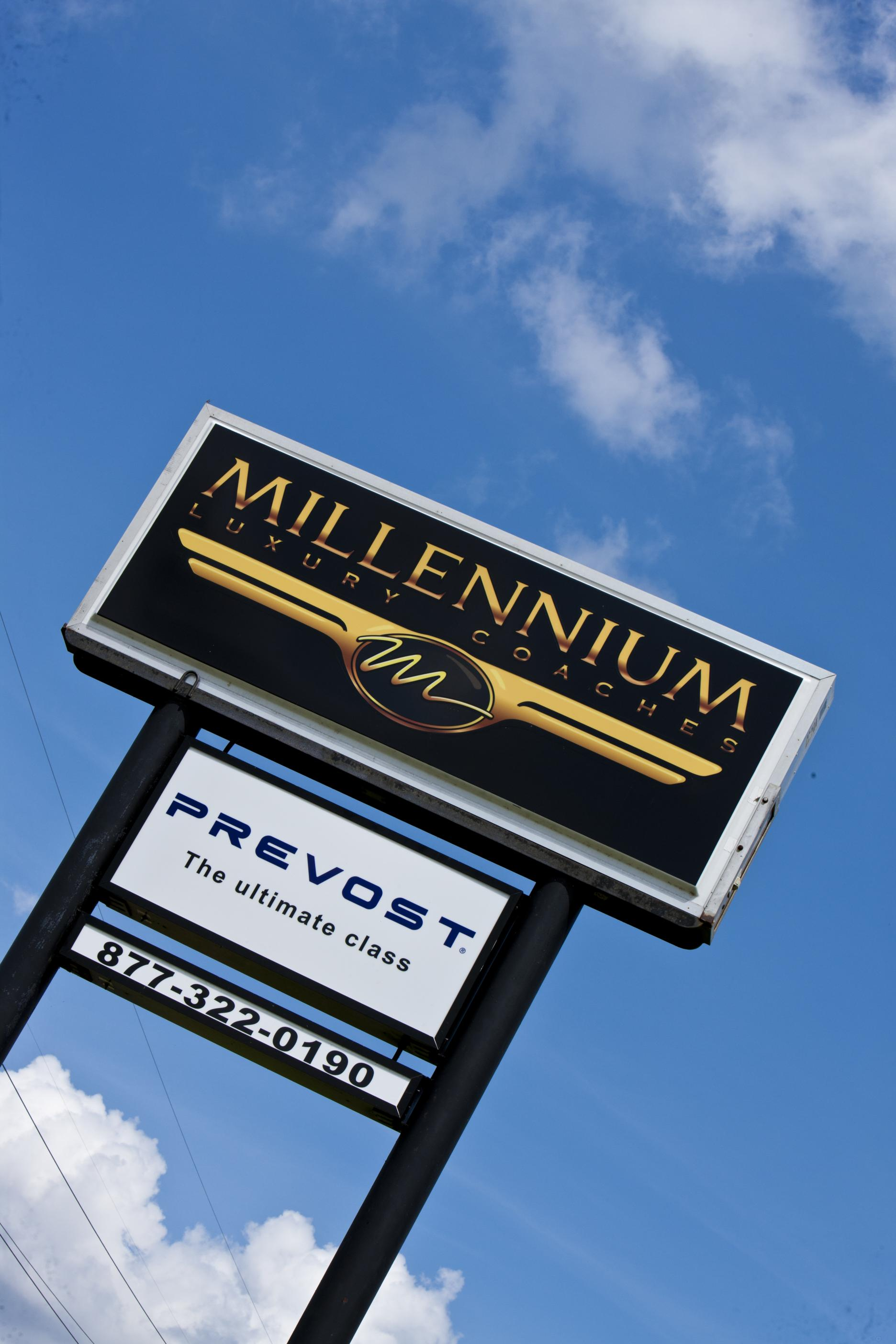
- Industry: Automotive
- Founded: 2001
- Founder: Nelson Figueroa
- Headquarters: Sanford, Florida USA,
- Products: luxury Coaches
- Website: www.millenniumluxurycoaches.com

Millennium Luxury Coaches is a luxury motor coach manufacturer based in Sanford, Florida, founded in 2001 by Nelson Figueroa.

== Achievements ==
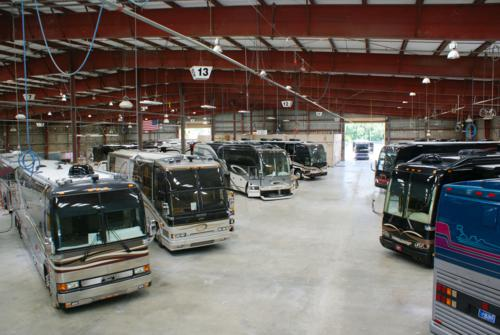
Facility interior

In January 2011, Millennium was a recipient of the inaugural 2011 Florida Companies to Watch Award, selected by the Edward Lowe Foundation.

In July 2012, Millennium gained approval to be added to Transport Canada's List of Vehicles Admissible from the United States, after confirming compliance with all applicable Canadian Motor Vehicle Safety Standards (CMVSS), and the Canadian Motor Vehicle Safety Act (MVSA).

In May 2013, Millennium received the Association for Corporate Growth's (ACG) SMART Award for the field of Distribution and Transportation.

In August 2013, Millennium was awarded the Ultimate Newcomer title, as part of the 2013 Golden 100 Awards.

== Events and television appearances ==
In January 2012, Millennium was selected to be featured in the TV show Ultimate Travel for their "Tricked Out Trailers" episode, appearing on the Travel Channel.

In April 2011, Millennium was featured on HouseSmarts TV with Lou Manfredini.

On October 4, 2012, it was announced that Millennium Luxury Coaches was to be featured for an upcoming series titled EPIC which was to air on Destination America. EPIC RVs premiered on February 11, 2013. On July 15, 2013, Millennium Luxury Coaches was to be featured on the season 2 premiere of EPIC, on Discovery's Destination America Network.

Millennium Luxury Coaches has also made radio appearances and industry-related appearances. These events include the Tampa RV Supershow, Concours d'Elegance, Fort Lauderdale International Boat Show, Cars for the Cure, Barrett Jackson Auto Auction, and RV shows.

In January 2013, Millennium Luxury Coaches announced a new video series entitled The Journey with episode 1, "The Journey Begins". Millennium planned for more episodes in the following months, showcasing the luxury coach building process.

Millennium has been featured on the June 2013 cover of Family Motor Coach Association Magazine.

Millennium hosts events such as the Millennium Annual Rally, providing an opportunity for client interaction, coach showcase, and on-site service. The company maintains ongoing relationships with customers through rallies and other industry events. They often attend or sponsor events and places like Mountain Falls Luxury Motorcoach Resort, Hearthside Grove Motorcoach Resort, Prevost Week 2025 by Prevost-Stuff, and many more.
