= Caraboat =

The Caraboat was a unique caravan/boat hybrid produced during the 1970s. As of today, the Caraboat is considered a collectors piece amongst caravan enthusiasts.

The boat aspects were designed by small boat designer John Askham. The hull and boxy superstructure are moulded from GRP, with large windows. The road chassis is a T-shaped steel backbone, inside the hull. The two wheels are carried on independent suspension units bolted through the hull to the crossmember. Towing is with a caravan-like towbar, hinged and bolted through the front of the hull. Unlike a conventional caravan, there is no jockey wheel, making handling difficult on slopes, such as slipways. Propulsion of the original Caraboat was by a waterjet drive and an internal Lombardini 4-stroke engine, although most surviving examples have been converted to use outboard motors.

Restoration of a 1970s Caraboat in Bristol was the subject of an episode of More4's My Floating Home in 2018.

== Dimensions ==
- Length (body): 4.9 m (16 ft)
- Length (overall): 5.5 m (18 ft)
- Width: 208 cm (6 ft 10 in)
- Height: 259 cm (8 ft 6 in)
- Headroom: 191 cm (6 ft 3 in)
- Weight: 730 kg (1,600 lb)
