= Zone RV =

Australian caravan manufacturer

- Type: Privately held company
- Industry: Recreational vehicle manufacturing
- Founded: 2015; 11 years ago in Coolum Beach, Queensland
- Founder: David Biggar; Matt Johns
- Headquarters: Australia
- Website: https://www.zonerv.com.au/

Zone RV is an Australian caravan manufacturer established in 2015 by co-founder and director David Biggar and co-founder and managing director Matt Johns. They are headquartered in Coolum, Sunshine Coast.

The company manufactures caravans using a timber-free construction method based on composite materials, including aluminium, fibreglass, foam and plastics.

Biggar is also the co-founder of Cure Composites, a supplier of high-strength floor panels to Zone RV, and CL Composites, which supplies wall and roof panels for the company's caravans.

Zone RV entered voluntary administration in 2024 and was subsequently liquidated in 2025 following financial difficulties.

== History ==
In its early years, the company reported turnover of $4.4 million in the 2015–16 financial year, reflecting rapid growth following its establishment in 2015.

As the company expanded, it outgrew several earlier premises and, in the late 2010s, moved into a purpose-built manufacturing facility in Coolum Business Park on the Sunshine Coast, reportedly costing approximately A$8 million. At the time of the move, the company employed around 90 staff.

== Recognition ==
Zone RV was nominated for Caravan World's Best Aussie Caravan in 2016.

== Grants ==
In 2022, during Australian Manufacturing Week, Zone RV received a Queensland Government Made in Queensland grant of more than $1.4 million.

In 2023, Zone RV received a A$1.16 million grant from the Queensland Government to support advanced manufacturing equipment, including a large-scale industrial 3D printer.

== Financial difficulties ==
In December 2024, Zone RV Holdings Pty Ltd and Zone Manufacturing Pty Ltd entered voluntary administration following sustained cash flow challenges and operational pressures. Administrators later reported that the company may have been insolvent as early as August 2023, with debts of approximately $42 million. Around 240 employees were made redundant, and administrators recommended that creditors vote to wind up the company while further investigations into its financial affairs were conducted. During the administration period, the business continued operating in a limited capacity, with a small number of partially completed caravans delivered to customers.

Media reports stated that a former senior executive had raised whistleblower allegations with the Australian Securities and Investments Commission (ASIC) in 2023 regarding Zone RV's financial position, which ASIC initially declined to formally investigate. Following the company's collapse, administrators reported total debts of approximately $42 million, including about $18 million owed to customers, and continued investigations into the circumstances of the administration, with findings to be reported to creditors and ASIC.

Administrators later reported that the company's debts included approximately $18 million in customer claims, about $4 million in employee entitlements, and between $15 million and $20 million owed to suppliers. Administrators also stated that a limited number of customers who had fully paid for their caravans were able to take delivery after paying an additional completion fee, with further completed vehicles released in stages during the administration period.

In early 2025, creditors voted to liquidate Zone RV. Media reports stated that approximately 140 customers were left without caravans they had paid for, with some deposits reported to be as high as A$150,000. While 38 customers received refunds or completed vehicles during the administration period, the remaining customers were advised they would need to wait for the outcome of the liquidation process to determine whether further recoveries were possible.

ABC News reported that Queensland Police confirmed they were investigating a fraud complaint relating to Zone RV's director following the company's liquidation. Liquidators stated that reports alleging potential breaches of the Corporations Act had been lodged with ASIC, and that further inquiries could result in public examinations or civil litigation.

In a subsequent report to creditors, administrators estimated that civil claims of up to A$21 million for alleged insolvent trading could potentially be pursued against the director.

ABC News later reported that the company's most recent audited financial statements showed a net loss of approximately $4.75 million in the 2023–24 financial year and net liabilities of about $10.8 million. The auditors noted material uncertainty regarding the company's ability to continue as a going concern, citing reliance on cash reserves and the need to secure additional financing. At the time, the company was holding more than $16 million in customer deposits and progress payments.
