= Cosalt =

British marine safety and leisure company

Cosalt plc
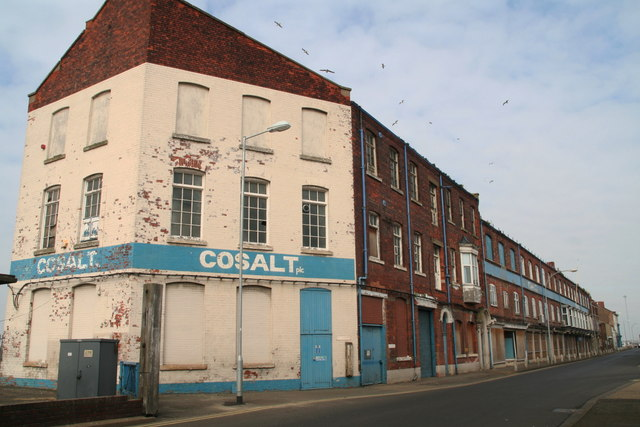
- Type: Public
- Traded as: LSE: CSLT
- Industry: Marine services
- Founded: 1873
- Headquarters: Grimsby, Lincolnshire, UK
- Key people: David P J Ross, Chairman; Trevor Sands, CEO; Paul Below, CFO
- Revenue: £111.98 million (2010)
- Operating income: £(793,000)(2010)
- Net income: £(3.144 million)(2010)
- Website: Cosalt plc

Cosalt plc was a diversified marine safety and leisure company, based in Grimsby, Lincolnshire. It was a constituent of the FTSE Fledgling Index.

The name Cosalt was a portmanteau of the company's original title The Great Grimsby Coal, Salt and Tanning Company. Formed in 1873 as a co-operative of fishing vessel owners, it was a communal best-value support services company involved in servicing and supplying a variety of products and services for fleets, fishing, and other vessels, providing:

- Salt - to preserve the food and fish caught
- Tanning - to waterproof sails and rope
- Coal - to fire the vessels and galleys
- Clothing

The communal model grew around a number of other fishing and later UK marine ports, before the company was bought out by the son of one of the original founders, businessman (John) Carl Ross of the Ross Group. The company floated in 1971, and was chaired by his son; and then grandson David Ross, co-founder of the Carphone Warehouse. The original businesses has now developed into marine and industrial safety centre, and diversified into other markets, including: Workwear and Corporatewear.

== Leisure ==
Through its association with Grimsby, Cosalt was a major player in the UK caravan market. It created the Piper brand, and after the failure of Sam Alper's Caravans International bought its brands, including: ACE, Abbey, Bessacarr, Sprite; and later the independent Cotswold brand. However, in the 1990s they began concentrating on static caravans, and sold off many of the touring caravan brand to the rival Swift Leisure. In the mid-2000s and looking to sell the Leisure business, the division was eventually sold to Leeds-based turnaround specialists Endless Fund, but collapsed into administration 12months later. After losing 240 jobs and one factory, it was bought by a management team and renamed Cosalt Custom Homes, preserving 20jobs.

== Collapse ==
Cosalt had a turbulent later history. Cosalt Marine was sold to Survitec in August 2011. This was followed shortly afterwards by an unsuccessful bid by chairman David Ross to buy and delist the company. Trading in the company's shares was suspended when the deadline for producing its Annual Results and Report for year end 31 December 2011 passed in April 2012.

Cosalt eventually went into administration on 15 February 2013, with a secured bank debt of £11.4M and pension deficit of almost £52M. Of the three operating divisions, Cosalt Wind Energy ceased trading and was liquidated, Cosalt Offshore was sold as a going concern to rival group ATR backed by NBGI Private Equity, and Cosalt Workwear sold as a going concern to Ross.
