= Swift Leisure =

British manufacturer of leisure vehicles

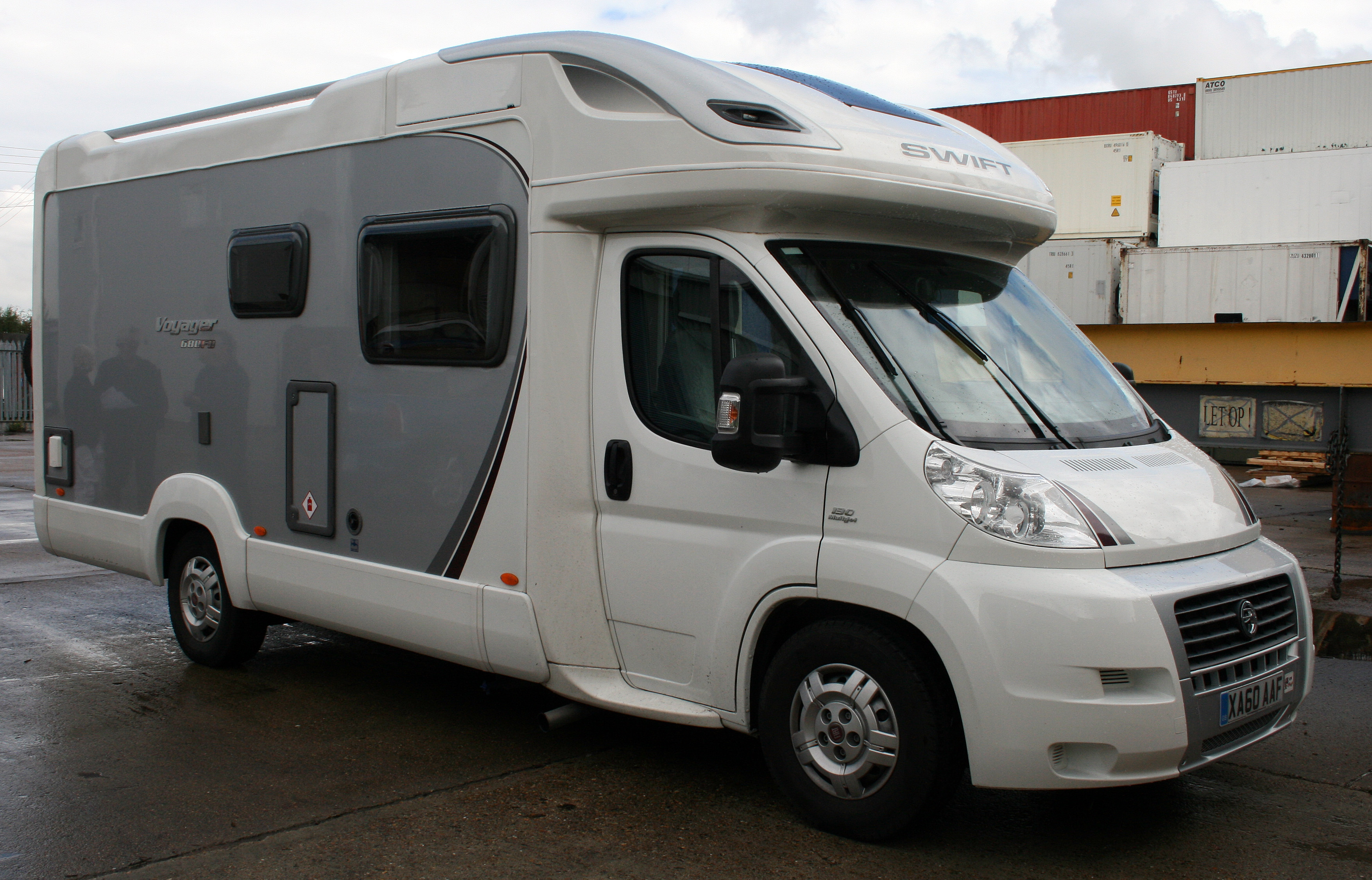

Swift Group are a British manufacturer of leisure vehicles, including caravans, motorhomes, campervans and holiday homes. Started in 1964, the company is based in Cottingham, East Riding of Yorkshire.

It celebrated its 60th year in 2024, whilst commemorating a milestone - a decade of Construction. Swift Live 2025 marked a return, drawing over a thousand visitors to explore the new season’s ranges, take guided factory tours, and experience Swift like never before with the cracking panoramic windows.

== History ==
Swift was founded in 1964 by Ken Smith. The company started with the single Swift brand of caravans, based on a distinctive tri-front window design (all of which opened – unique at the time), which also allowed easy see through to the rear for the driver whilst travelling.

Following the break-up of the travelling caravan business of Cosalt plc, in 1994 the company acquired the Cosalt brand of Abbey, followed in 1994 with the purchase of Sprite leisure and the Ace brand in 2001. Since late 2008 Swift Leisure has dropped the Abbey and Ace brands of touring caravans. Within the Swift International division, the company has operations in Denmark, the Netherlands and New Zealand.

The company moved manufacturing from Hedon Road, Kingston upon Hull to Dunswell Lane, near Cottingham in 1970. In the early 2000s the company moved to an adjacent site in Cottingham to allow expanded production facilities.

=== Timeline ===
Key events in the companies history:

- 1964 Swift Caravans founded
- 1986 Swift Motorhomes launched, with the Kon-Tiki motorhome, named for Thor Heyerdahl's expedition.
- 1992 Abbey Caravans purchased
- 1994 Sprite Leisure purchased
- 1995 Sprite Leisure renamed Sterling
- 1996 Bessacarr Caravans purchased
- 1997 Bessacarr Motorhomes launched
- 2001 Ace Caravans purchased
- 2001 Ace Motorhomes launched
- 2004 Swift Holiday Homes launched
- 2004 Sprite Caravans relaunched
- 2008 Autocruise purchased

== Group brands ==
- Abbey
  - Caravans (until 2008)
- Ace
  - Caravans (until 2008)
  - Motorhomes (until 2008)
- Autocruise (purchased in 2007)
  - Motorhomes
- Bessacar
  - Caravans (until 2006)
  - Motorhomes
- Escape
  - Motorhomes
- Mondial
  - Motorhomes
- Sprite
  - Caravans
- Sterling
  - Caravans
- Swift
  - Caravans
  - Motorhomes
