= SEA Group =

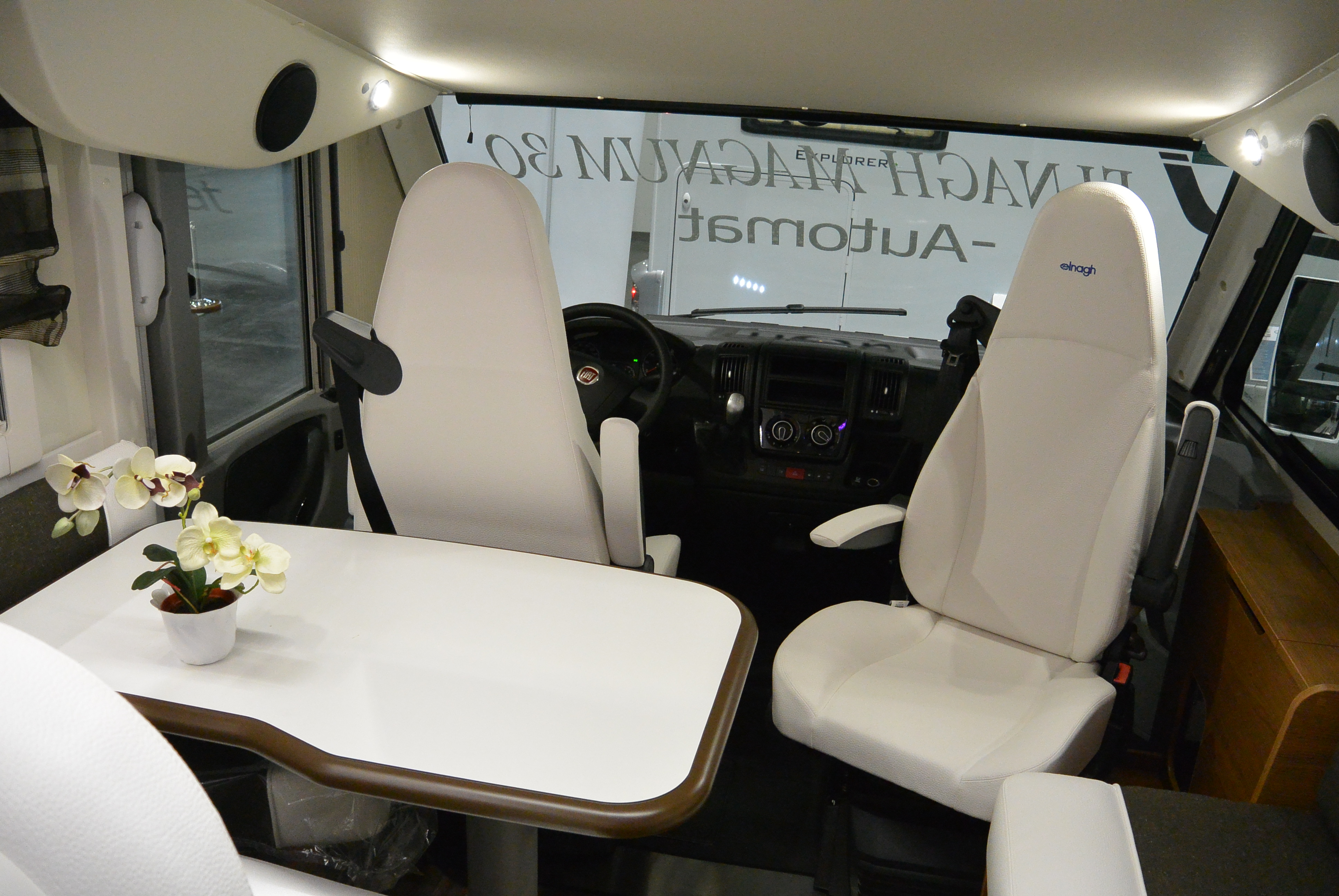
- Interior of the Elnagh model from 2014
- Company type: Subsidiary
- Industry: Automobile industry
- Predecessor: Elnagh, McLouis and Mobilvetta
- Founded: 2000; 25 years ago
- Headquarters: Trivolzio, Lombardy, Italy
- Area served: Europe
- Products: Motorcaravans
- Number of employees: 630 (2013)
- Parent: Trigano
- Website: www.elnagh.com; www.mclouis.com; mobilvetta.it

SEA Group (Italian – Societa' Europea Autocaravan; pronounced "sayer") is an Italian headquartered motorcaravan manufacturer, based in Trivolzio, Lombardy. It was founded in 2000 and after various difficulties, has been owned by the French group Trigano since 2013.

== History ==
The company was created in 2000 by the merger of three companies: Elnagh, McLouis and Mobilvetta. The group employs 650 people across 11 locations, and produces 13,000 units per annum. It is the third largest manufacturer of motorcaravans in Europe, and has regional offices based in Germany, Spain and the United Kingdom.

In 2004 it was subject to a management buyout financed by Bridgepoint Capital; and in 2005 it took over the British based Auto-Sleepers group.

In June 2009, existing Auto-Sleepers directors Geoff Scott and Mike Crouch acquired 100% of ASG (Auto Sleepers and Marquis Retail), which acts as distributor for all SEA Group products within the UK.

In January 2013, SEA became part of French public company Trigano.

== Group brands ==
- Elnagh
- Mobilvetta
- Mc Louis
- Miller

=== Former brands ===
- Auto-Sleepers
- Marquis
- Joint
- Dream
- Sharky
- Orian
