= Motorhome =

Type of vehicle

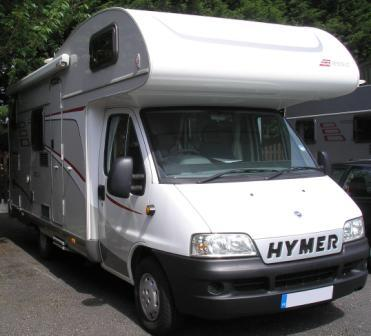
A coachbuilt Hymer motorhome

A motorhome (or coach) is a type of self-propelled recreational vehicle (RV) which is, as the name suggests, like a home on wheels.

== Features ==
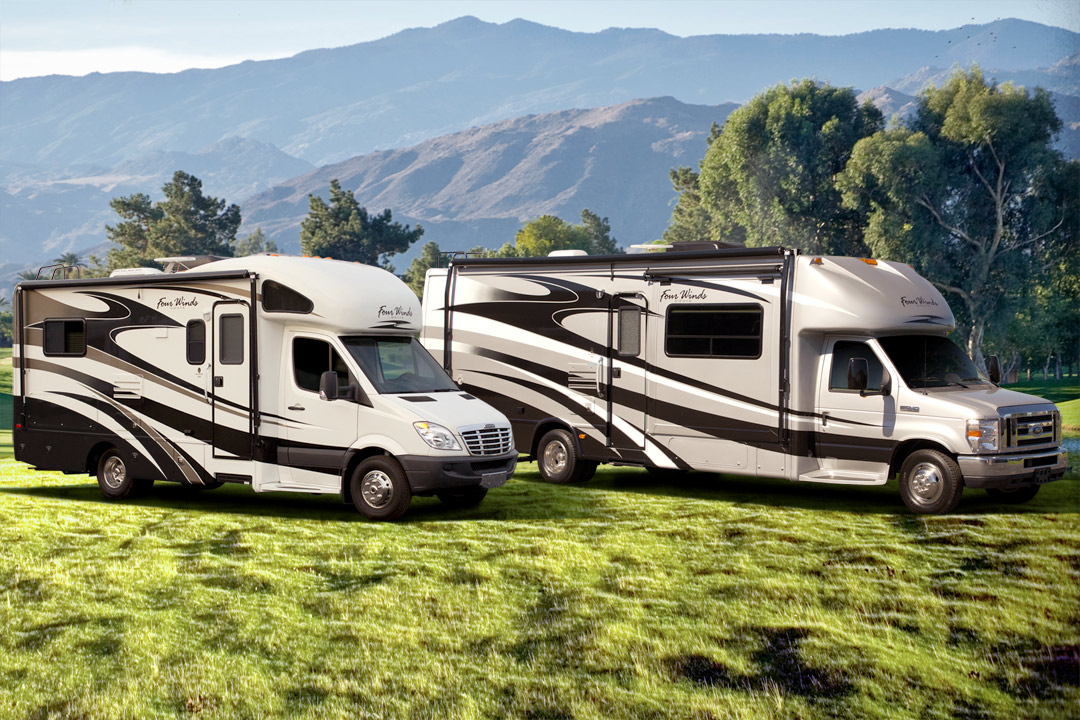
Two Class C motorhomes, built on (left) Freightliner Sprinter and (right) Ford E-Series chassis.

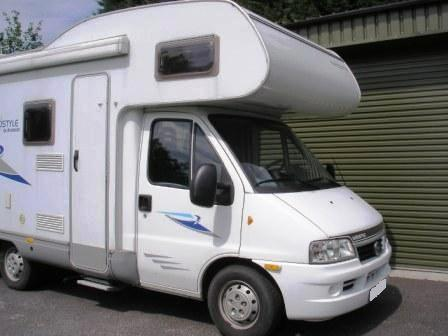
Dethleffs alcove motorhome

Motorhomes usually have sleeping spaces for two to eight people. Each sleeping space is either fixed or converted from another part of the motorhome's interior, usually a fold-out sofa. A kitchenette area contains cooking equipment. The type of equipment included differs depending on the motorhome make and model, but generally, a kitchenette has a stovetop, oven, refrigerator, and sink. More luxury models may also provide a microwave. A small bathroom with a shower, sink, and toilet is usually also located in the motorhome. On smaller motorhomes, the toilet may be of the "cassette toilet" type, which is a kind of portable toilet or container-based toilet. The toilet sometimes swivels to provide extra room and can be accessed from outside the motorhome for easy emptying. Larger motorhomes usually have a separate shower cubicle.

A motorhome also has a cab area with a driver and passenger seat. These seats often swivel to become part of the living space. A dinette area provides a table and seating space typically used for eating meals. A lounge may also be included, consisting of either a U-shaped sofa located in the rear of the motorhome or a side lounge.

=== Variations in terminology ===
In the United Kingdom and the United States, the word motorhome is commonly used. On occasion, other synonyms are used, such as motor home and motor caravan.

In Germany, a motorhome is referred to as a Wohnmobil. In Sweden, the term husbil means motorhome. In France, a motorhome is called a camping-car. In Italy, the term camper is used to mean motorhome in general, and the term motorhome refers to Class A motorhomes in particular. Spain and Portugal use auto caravana or auto-caravana. In the Netherlands and in Poland, the term camper is used.

In Australia and New Zealand, the term campervan is frequently used for smaller vans, either with a low top or high top that do not have a toilet and shower. In New Zealand, the term housebus is frequently used for larger motorhomes.

In some countries, the proprietary name Winnebago has been largely genericised to refer to any motorhome.

== History ==
The origins of the motorhome date back to 1910, when the Pierce-Arrow motor company introduced the Touring Landau model at the Madison Square Garden auto show. The Pierce-Arrow's entry was specialized for the camper in mind—providing cargo compartments for camping equipment and even an on-board toilet. In the 1920s, individual builders and manufactures began to convert panel trucks and buses to be used for camping. Designers patterned these "housecars" after airplanes, boats, and buses.

RV production was halted during World War II and would not resume for the domestic market until the 1950s. When production did begin again, designers began grafting trailer bodies onto truck or bus chassis.

Raymond Frank gave these housecars their contemporary name of “motorhome". Following a pattern common in RV history, in 1958 Frank designed and built his first motorhome so his family could take vacations to Florida and the mid-west; it was 27 feet (8.2 m) long and mounted on a Dodge chassis. Soon afterwards, other campers took an interest in the design and asked Frank to build them one too. By 1960, the Franks had sold seven motorhomes, and decided to open Frank Motor Homes, Inc. the next year. With the stylish fiberglass construction and contemporary color palette, the Frank motorhomes became an acceptable option for 1960s suburbanites who wanted an RV but scoffed at the travel trailer.

Soon other firms began to manufacture these mainstream motorhomes. In 1958, one of the most recognizable names in motorhomes was launched—Winnebago. Under the direction of John Hanson, Winnebago began to produce nearly all of their motorhomes' components other than the chassis. In ten years, Winnebago had grown from 415 employees to 1,252 in 1969 with over $3 million in sales. While Winnebago was the market leader, other companies were also growing. In 1969 a total of 23,100 motorhomes were sold. While the gas crunch of the 1970s drove many manufacturers out of business—including Frank Motorhomes (then known as Travco)—today, the motorhome market continues to be strong. In 2014, 43,900 motorhomes were sold in the United States.

== Categories ==
Motorhomes can be roughly categorized into three categories:

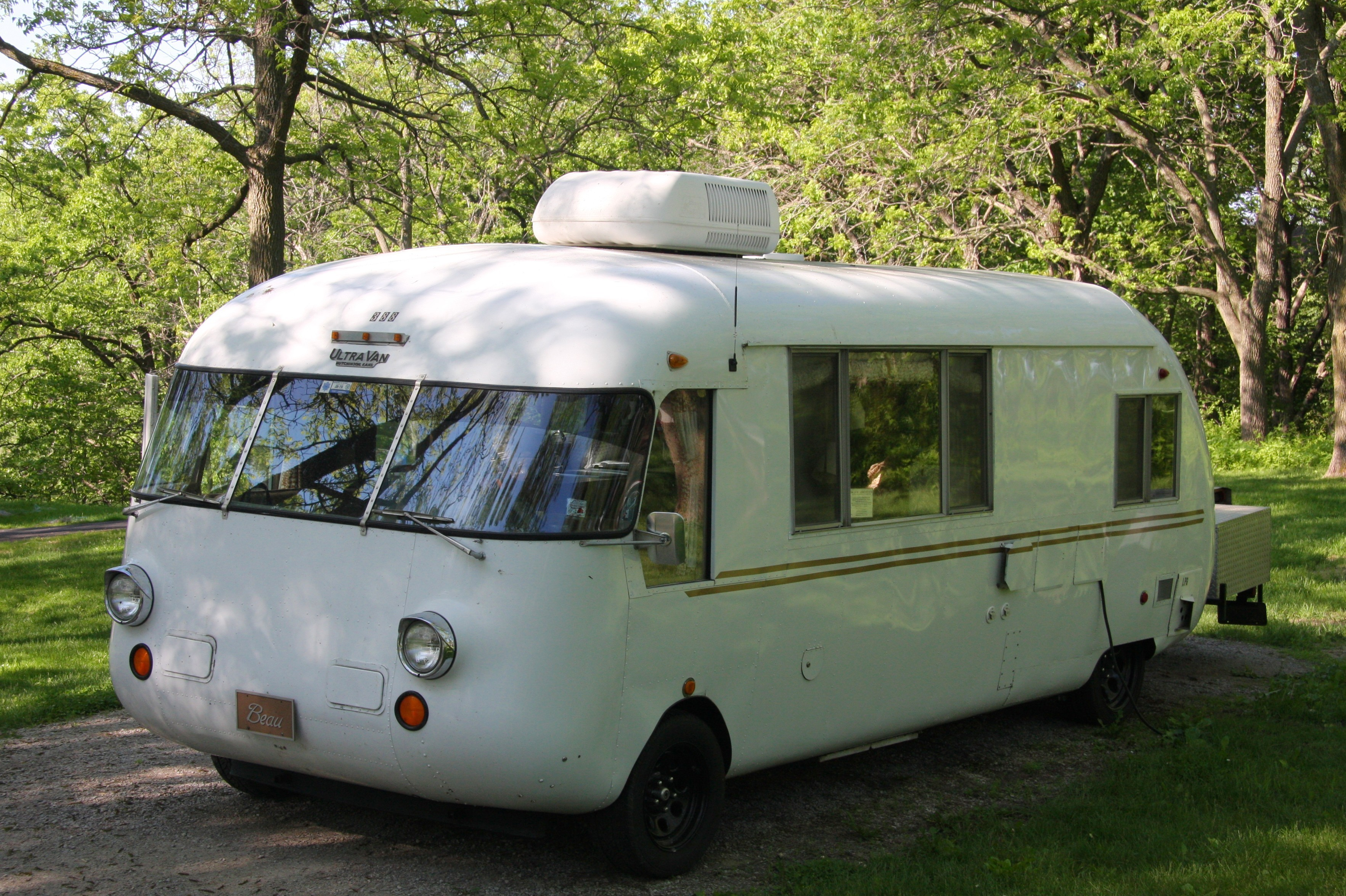
Class A Ultra Van, manufactured 1968

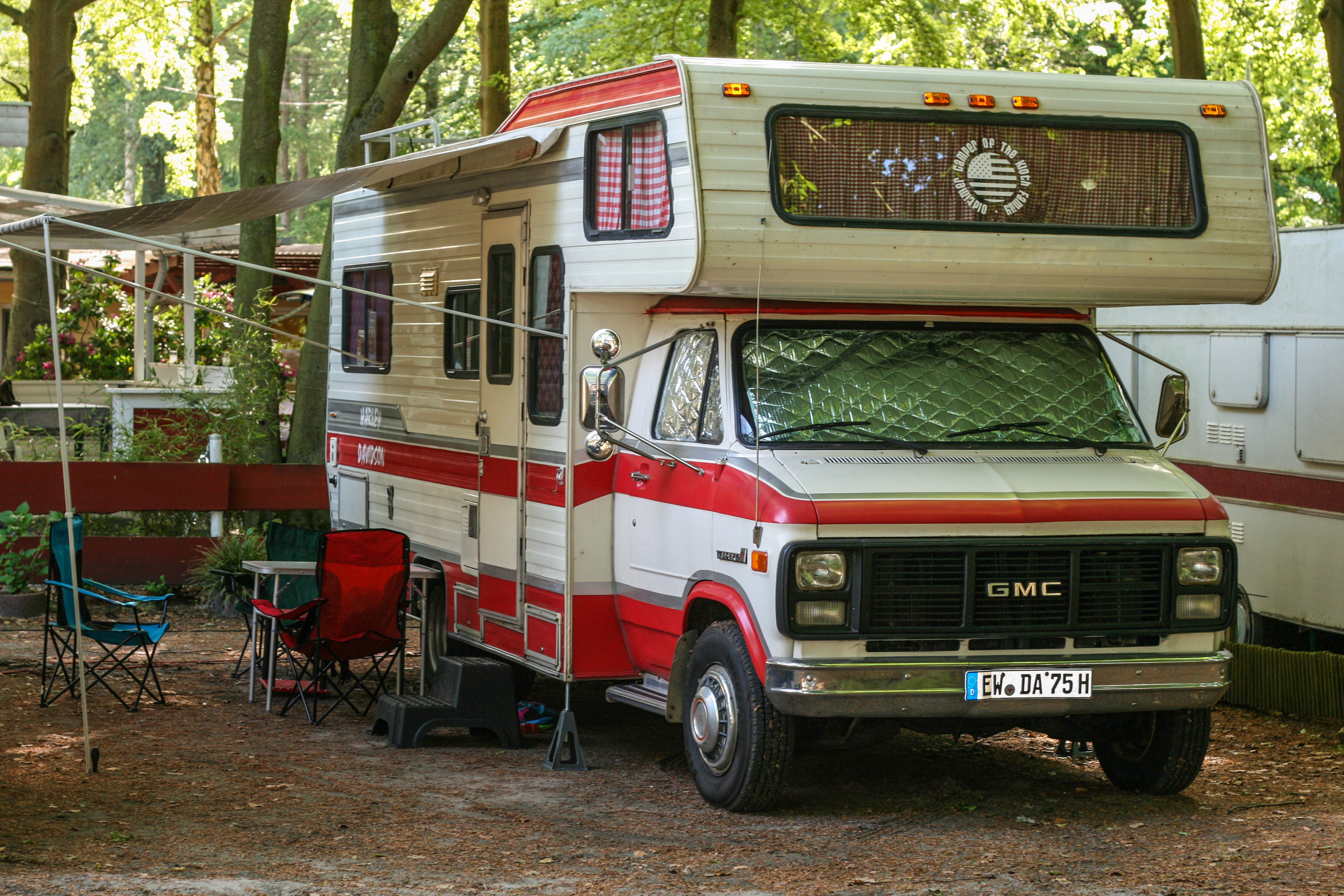
Campervan, Oldtimer with alcove, GMC

Class A (also known as integrated)
A Class A motorhome often has a reputation for being the most luxurious and expensive of vehicles. It has a solid body with the driving area integrated into the standard living accommodation. This style of motorhome will have a large and expansive front window which offers a good view of the road and surrounding landscape. Berths convert from lounge or dinette areas. The largest Class A motorhomes are powered by diesel engines at the rear typically fitted with air brakes and are known as “diesel pushers.”

Class B (also known as semi-integrated)
A Class B motorhome is also referred to as a low profile or semi-integrated motorhome. It is built in the same way as a Class C motorhome, except no berths are provided over the cab area. As a result, the overall height of this motorhome is lower than a Class C. There is usually a fixed double bed in the rear of the vehicle.

Class C (also known as alcove)
A Class C motorhome may also be known as coach built. It has a trailer- or caravan-style body which is mounted onto a cutaway van or truck chassis. There is usually a double berth over the driving cab. Ford and Fiat manufacture the majority of these motorhome chasses in Europe.

Super C (also known as alcove)
A Super C motorhome is a significantly larger and more heavier variant of the Class C motorhome, with a more robust body mounted onto a medium- to heavy-duty truck chassis, also featuring beds above the truck cab. Similar to Class A “diesel pushers,” Super C motorhomes are usually offered with air brakes to handle their higher weights. The largest Super C motorhomes are based on Class 8 semi-truck tractor unit chassis, having significantly higher weight and towing capacity than the largest Class A motorhomes and utilize tandem drive axles to handle its weight. This added weight capacity allows heavier rock floors, sturdier cabinetry, and larger appliances to be fitted to the inside unlike other motorhomes.

== See also ==
- Campervan
- List of recreational vehicles
- List of recreational vehicle manufacturers
- Motorhome hire agency
- Recreational travel
