= Beaumont Transit =

Transit agency serving Beaumont, California, U.S.

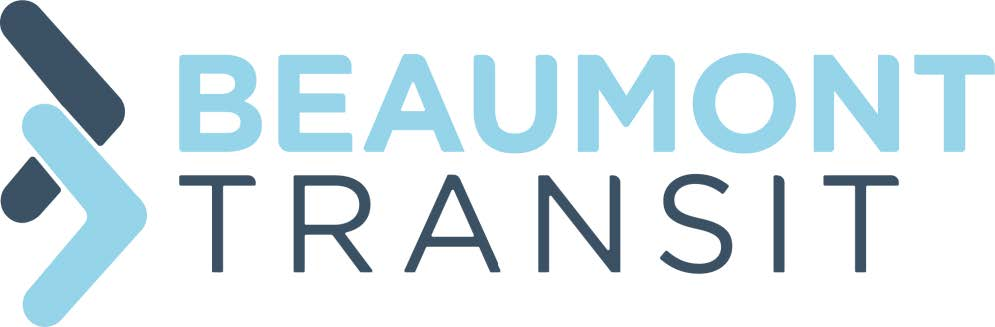

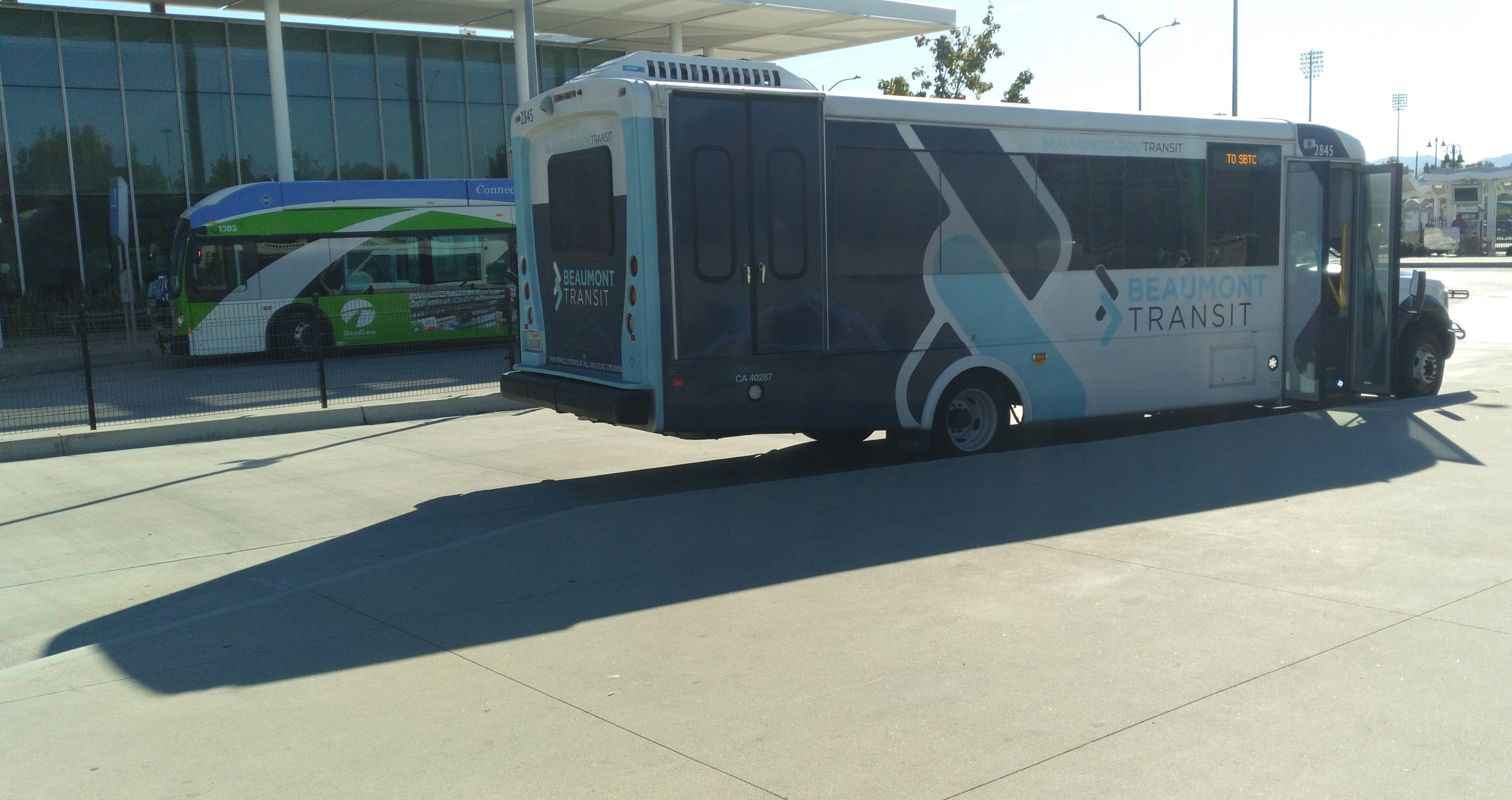
- Beaumont Transit Vehicle in San Bernardino in 2022
- Parent: City of Beaumont
- Locale: Beaumont, California
- Service type: Bus service, paratransit
- Routes: 9
- Website: beaumontca.gov/transit

Beaumont Transit, formerly Pass Transit, is a transit agency providing public transport bus services primarily in the community of Beaumont, California, United States. The agency operates fixed-route local services, commuter express buses to nearby communities and curb-to-curb Dial a Ride services to certified passengers.

== History ==
Beaumont transit, which was operating as Pass Transit, used to operate route 136 in Calimesa. Service to Calimesa was discontinued due to low ridership in 2018

In 2019, Pass Transit was split into two transit systems. Becoming Beaumont Transit, and Banning Connect after disagreements between the city of Banning and city of Beaumont.

== Routes ==
=== Fixed-route ===
Beaumont Transit a total of eight routes. On weekdays, there are two fixed-route local services, three commuter express routes, and two school-day only routes. On weekends there is one local fixed-route service and one commuter express route. No service is provided on Sunday.

Route	Terminals		Via	Notes
3	Beaumont Walmart	Cherry Valley Beaumont High School	Starlight Av	
4	Beaumont Walmart	Beaumont Beaumont Library	8th St, Pennsylvania Av	
3/4	Beaumont Walmart	Beaumont Cougar Way & Beaumont Ave	8th St, Beaumont Av	
7-1	Beaumont Oak Valley Pkwy & Desert Lawn Dr	Beaumont Beaumont High School	Oak Valley Pkwy	
7-2	Beaumont 6th St & Orange Av	Beaumont Beaumont High School	4th St, Brookside Av	
9	Beaumont Manzanita Pkwy & Brownie Wy	Beaumont Beaumont High School	1st St	

=== Express routes ===
Route	Terminals		Via	Notes
120	Beaumont Walmart	San Bernardino San Bernardino Transit Center	I-10	
125	Beaumont Walmart	Loma Linda VA Hospital	I-10	
Casino Express	Beaumont Walmart	Cabazon Morongo Casino	I-10	

== Bus fleet ==
=== Active fleet ===
Make/Model	Fleet numbers	Thumbnail	Year	Engine	Transmission	Notes
Chevrolet C5500	2823		2009			
Glaval Entourage	2823		2009			
Ford E450	2824-2826		2010			
Starcraft Allstar	2824-2826		2010			
Chevrolet C5500	2827-2829		2009			
Starcraft Allstar XL	2827-2829		2009			
Ford F550	2830-2832		2012			
ENC Aero Elite	2830-2832		2012			
Ford F550	2833		2012			
ENC Aero Elite	2833		2012			
ENC XHF 40' CNG	2837-2839		2015	Cummins Westport ISL G	Allison B400R	
Ford F550	2840		2016			
ENC National Aero Elite	2840		2016			
ENC EZ Rider II BRT 32' CNG	2842		2018	Cummins Westport L9N	Allison B3400 xFE	
GreenPower EV Star	2846-2847		2019			
ENC EZ Rider II BRT 32' CNG	2848-2849		2023	Cummins Westport L9N	Allison B3400xFE	
