= Basin Transit =

Public transport agency in San Bernardino County, California, US

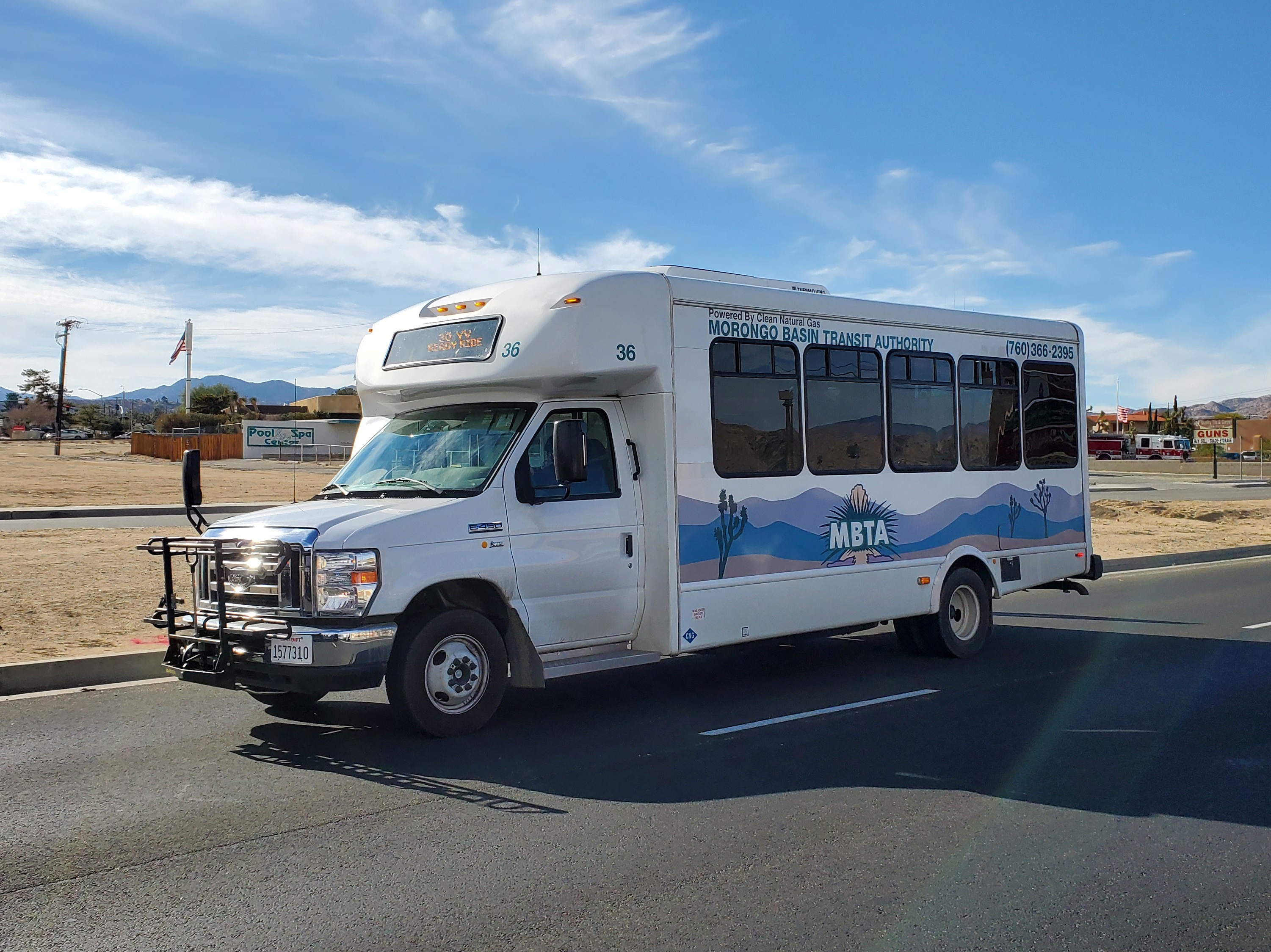
- MBTA Ready Ride vehicle in Yucca Valley in 2021
- Headquarters: 62405 Verbena Road; Joshua Tree, California
- Service area: Morongo Basin
- Service type: bus service, paratransit
- Routes: 8
- Hubs: 2
- Fleet: 24 buses
- Annual ridership: 186,270 (FY2024)
- Fuel type: CNG
- Website: basin-transit.com

Basin Transit, formerly Morongo Basin Transit Authority (MBTA), is the transit agency that serves the Morongo Basin in San Bernardino County, California. It is a joint powers authority between Yucca Valley, Twentynine Palms, and San Bernardino County. In addition to service within the Morongo Basin, it connects the Morongo Basin to Palm Springs International Airport. Basin Transit's service area is 1,300 square miles.

== History ==
In 2015, MBTA faced unionization efforts by the coach operators. MBTA responded to such these efforts by establishing employee outreach programs and adjusting pay to stave off attempts at unionization.

MBTA operated Joshua Tree National Park's RoadRunner shuttle during fiscal years 2018 and 2019. Service was terminated due to low ridership.

In 2022, MBTA changed its name to Basin Transit.

== Routes ==
=== Local routes ===
Route	Terminals		via	Notes
1	Twentynine Palms Bourke Rd & 6th St	Yucca Valley Hwy 62 & Kickapoo (Park & Ride)	Adobe Rd, Hwy 62	
3A	Twentynine Palms Palms Transit Center		Adobe Rd, Sturgis Rd	Loop
3B	Twentynine Palms Palms Transit Center		Utah Trail, 2 Mile Rd, Sullivan Rd	Loop
7A	Yucca Valley Yucca Valley Transit Center		Hwy 62, Sunnyslope Dr	Loop
7B	Yucca Valley Yucca Valley Transit Center		Hwy 62, Onaga Trail	Loop
12	Yucca Valley Yucca Valley Transit Center	Palm Springs Palm Springs Airport	Hwy 62, Indian Canyon Dr	
15	Twentynine Palms Bourke Rd & 6th St	Palm Springs Palm Springs Airport	Adobe Rd, Hwy 62, Indian Canyon Dr	
21	Yucca Valley Yucca Valley Transit Center		Hwy 62, Yucca Mesa Rd, Aberdeen Dr	Loop

== Bus fleet ==
=== Active fleet ===
Make/Model	Fleet numbers	Thumbnail	Year	Engine	Transmission	Notes
Ford E-450	29-34		2018			
StarTrans Senator II	29-34		2018			
Chevrolet G4500	35		2019			
ARBOC	35		2019			
Ford E-450	36		2019			
StarTrans Senator II	36		2019			
Ford F-550	312-314		2016			
ElDorado National Aero Elite	312-314		2016			
Ford F-550	315		2016			
Glaval	315		2016			
Ford F-550	316		2016			
StarTrans	316		2016			
Ford F-550	317-320		2018			
Glaval Entourage	317-320		2018			
Ford F-550	321-322		2019			
Glaval Entourage	321-322		2019			
Ford F-550	323		2019			
ElDorado National Aero Elite	323		2019			
ElDorado National XHF 35' CNG	754-756		2012	Cummins Westport ISL G		
Gillig Low Floor CNG 35'	757		2020	Cummins Westport L9N		
Gillig Low Floor CNG 35'	758		2021	Cummins Westport L9N		
