= ISE Corporation =

American hybrid electric powertrain system manufacturer

- Founded: January 1995; 31 years ago in San Diego, California, US
- Defunct: August 2010
- Headquarters: Poway, California, US
- Key people: Rick Sander, CEO and President
- Website: isecorp.com (not live)

ISE Corporation ("International Space Enterprises", later "Innovative Solutions for Energy") was a manufacturer and integrator of heavy-duty hybrid electric powertrain systems for transit bus and truck use, based in San Diego and later Poway, California. ISE was founded in 1995 and filed for bankruptcy in 2010, shortly after raising $20 million in its initial public offering on the Toronto Stock Exchange.

== History ==
ISE Corporation was founded in January 1995 by David M. Mazaika and Michael C. Simon, engineers who had formerly worked for General Dynamics. The company's initial funding came from a research grant provided by the South Coast Air Quality Management District to develop and test hybrid electric vehicles and vehicle components. ISE entered a strategic partnership with Siemens in 2002, where ISE would use the Siemens ELFA traction motor, inverter, and generator in its series hybrid drivetrain systems for the United States.

ISE started as an integrator, refitting vehicles with hybrid electric or electric power, including transit buses, tow tractors, and trucks. In the first quarter of 2005, ISE moved from San Diego to Poway.

After it declared bankruptcy in 2010, ISE sold its assets at auction to Bluways USA in February 2011 for $3.76 million.

== Products ==
ISE Corporation had two divisions: the first, simply named ISE, supported space exploration by designing micro-rover vehicles for developing and testing space system software. The second, ISE Research, was dedicated to developing hybrid electric powertrains for heavy-duty transportation applications (Class 6 and up trucks, tow tractors, transit buses). In total, ISE shipped approximately 300 hybrid electric drivetrain systems.

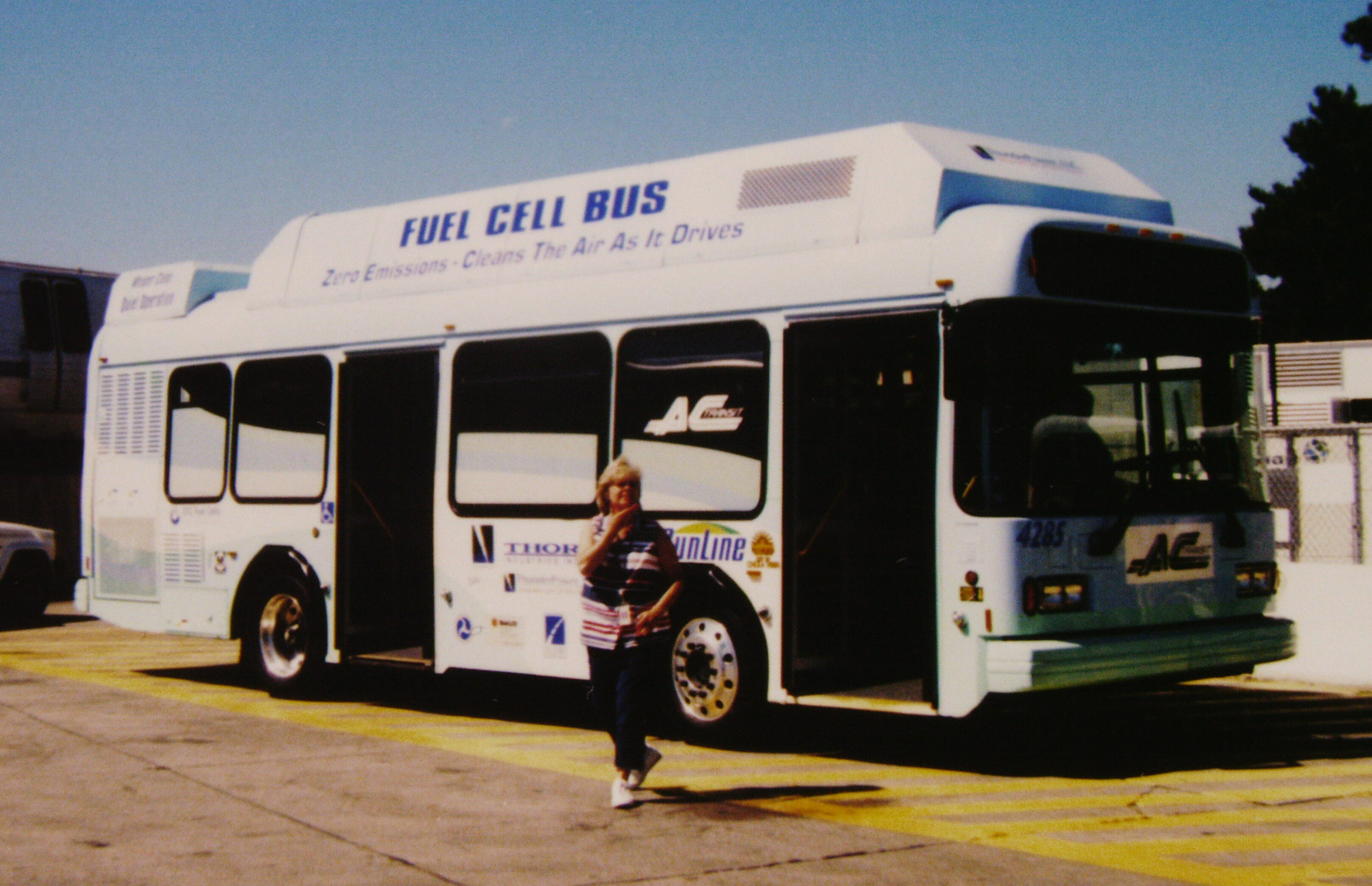
ThunderVolt bus based on 30' ElDorado National E-Z Rider with hydrogen fuel cell APU, in test service with AC Transit (c.2002)

ISE Research used the brand ThunderVolt to refer to the series hybrid drivetrains it had developed. The drivetrain included the traction motor(s) and controllers (branded ELFA, provided by Siemens), an energy storage system (battery, charger, and management; or ultracapacitor), auxiliary power unit (APU, to generate electric power for the traction motor and energy storage systems), and hybrid system controllers. As integrated into a mid-size (30') ElDorado National E-Z Rider transit bus, APU options included conventional piston engines (General Motors V8 or Cummins 5.9L), using diesel, gasoline, propane, or compressed natural gas; Capstone gas turbine; and hydrogen fuel cell.

ISE introduced the Hybrid Hydrogen Internal Combustion Engine (HHICE) variant of the ThunderVolt in 2005. The HHICE bus used a Ford Triton V10 gasoline engine that had been converted to burn hydrogen, coupled with an electric generator as the APU for the series hybrid system; it was first tested by SunLine Transit Agency. During revenue service with SunLine, the HHICE engine overheated twice and caught fire once in three separate incidents in 2007. Transport for London ordered ten hydrogen-powered buses from ISE in 2007, split equally as five fuel cell and five HHICE APU buses.

=== Clients ===
Selected users of transit buses equipped with ISE hybrid drivetrains included:

ISE Corporation hybrid powertrain clients
Transit Agency	Bus Chassis			Qty	Year	Notes
Transit Agency	Make	Model	Image	Qty	Year	Notes
LADOT	ElDorado National	MST and E-Z Rider		5	1999	Gasoline-electric and Capstone Turbine-electric buses
e-tran	Gillig	Phantom		21	2004	Gasoline-electric hybrid drivetrains retrofitted to used buses by Complete Coach Works; the buses were unreliable and caught fire at least 30 times.
Long Beach Transit	New Flyer	GE40LF / GE40LFA		87	2005–08	Energy storage using ultracapacitors from Maxwell Technologies instead of traction batteries; fuel costs were comparable to or higher than conventional diesel buses. More units were ordered in 2007 and 2008; fleet had accumulated 5,000,000 mi (8,000,000 km) of service collectively by 2008.
SunLine Transit Agency & Winnipeg Transit	New Flyer	HE40LF		1	2005	Briefly tested in revenue service; in this Hybrid Hydrogen Internal Combustion Engine (HHICE) bus, a conventional engine was converted to burn hydrogen and coupled to a generator similar to the Long Beach Transit gasoline-electric buses.
LA Metro	NABI	42-BRT		6	2008	Gasoline-electric hybrid buses with BRT styling.
RTC Transit	Wright	StreetCar		50	2008	Diesel-electric hybrid articulated buses for bus rapid transit service.
BC Transit	New Flyer	H40LFR		20	2010	Fuel cell buses for 2010 Winter Games; planning began in 2007, with the governments of Canada and British Columbia contributing CA$89.5 million to purchase and operate the buses for four years. The first bus was unveiled on October 2, 2009. The buses were sold after 2014 after collectively accumulating more than 3,000,000 km (1,900,000 mi) of revenue service.
