= ElDorado (bus manufacturer) =

American manufacturer of cutaway buses

- Formerly: ElDorado National–Kansas; ElDorado Motor Corporation; ElDorado R.V.; Ward Manufacturing, Honorbuilt Division; Honorbuilt Manufacturing
- Company type: Subsidiary
- Industry: Automotive
- Headquarters: Salina, Kansas, United States
- Products: Cutaway buses
- Parent: Forest River
- Website: eldorado-bus.com

ElDorado (formerly ElDorado National–Kansas) is an American manufacturer of cutaway buses, owned by Forest River, with its headquarters and main factory in Salina, Kansas.

The company was founded in 1960 as Honorbuilt Manufacturing, was acquired by Ohio-based Ward Manufacturing in 1965, was renamed El Dorado R.V. in 1978 and started building cutaway buses by 1980. The company combined with National Coach Corporation, a California-based builder of transit buses in 1991 to become El Dorado National–Kansas and El Dorado National–California. The combined El Dorado National became one of the light-duty and mid-size buses for the airport/hotel/rental car shuttle bus markets and local transit operators with smaller fleets.

ElDorado National was sold to Allied Specialty Vehicles (later renamed REV Group) in 2013. In 2020, the Kansas-based cutaway bus manufacturing business was spun off as ElDorado and sold to Forest River. El Dorado National–California was renamed ENC and remains owned by REV Group. Plans to shut down ENC were announced in early 2024.

== History ==
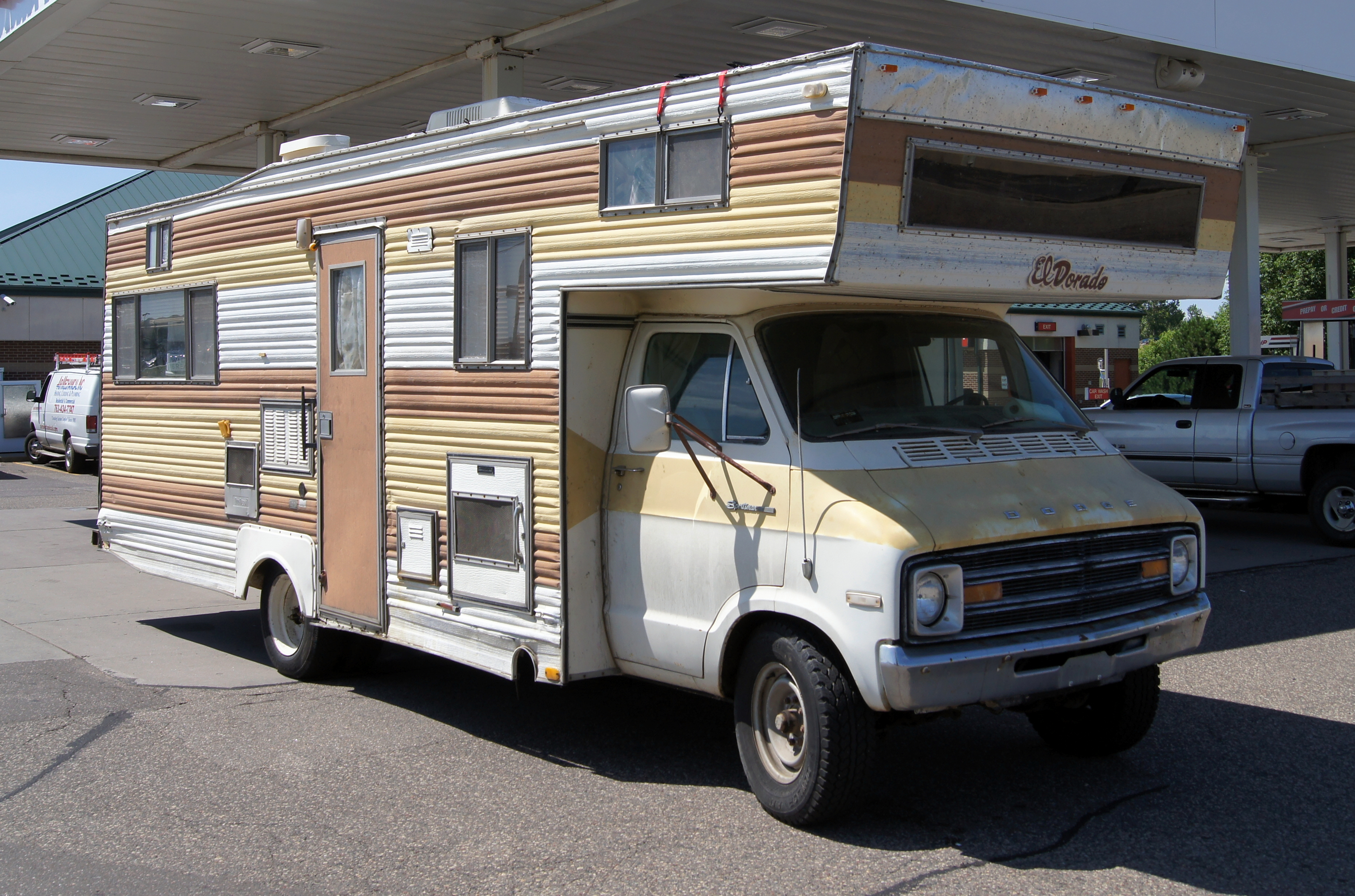
1975 ElDorado recreational vehicle (photographed in 2013)

Honorbuilt Manufacturing was founded in 1960 by Bob Stewart to manufacture recreational campers under license in Minneapolis, Kansas. By 1964, the Honorbuilt Trailer Manufacturing Co. was producing the most popular pickup truck camper bed insert in the United States, branded as the "El Dorado coach". Honorbuilt was acquired by Ohio-based Ward Manufacturing in November 1965 and continued operations as the Honorbuilt Division, adding "Nimrod" trucks and coaches to its product lineup shortly after acquisition, which required an expansion to the Minneapolis plant. Stewart bought out the last of his partners in 1978 and incorporated as El Dorado R.V., Inc.; the company subsequently entered the commercial bus market in 1979 or 1980, offering cutaway minibuses under the "Falcon" brand.

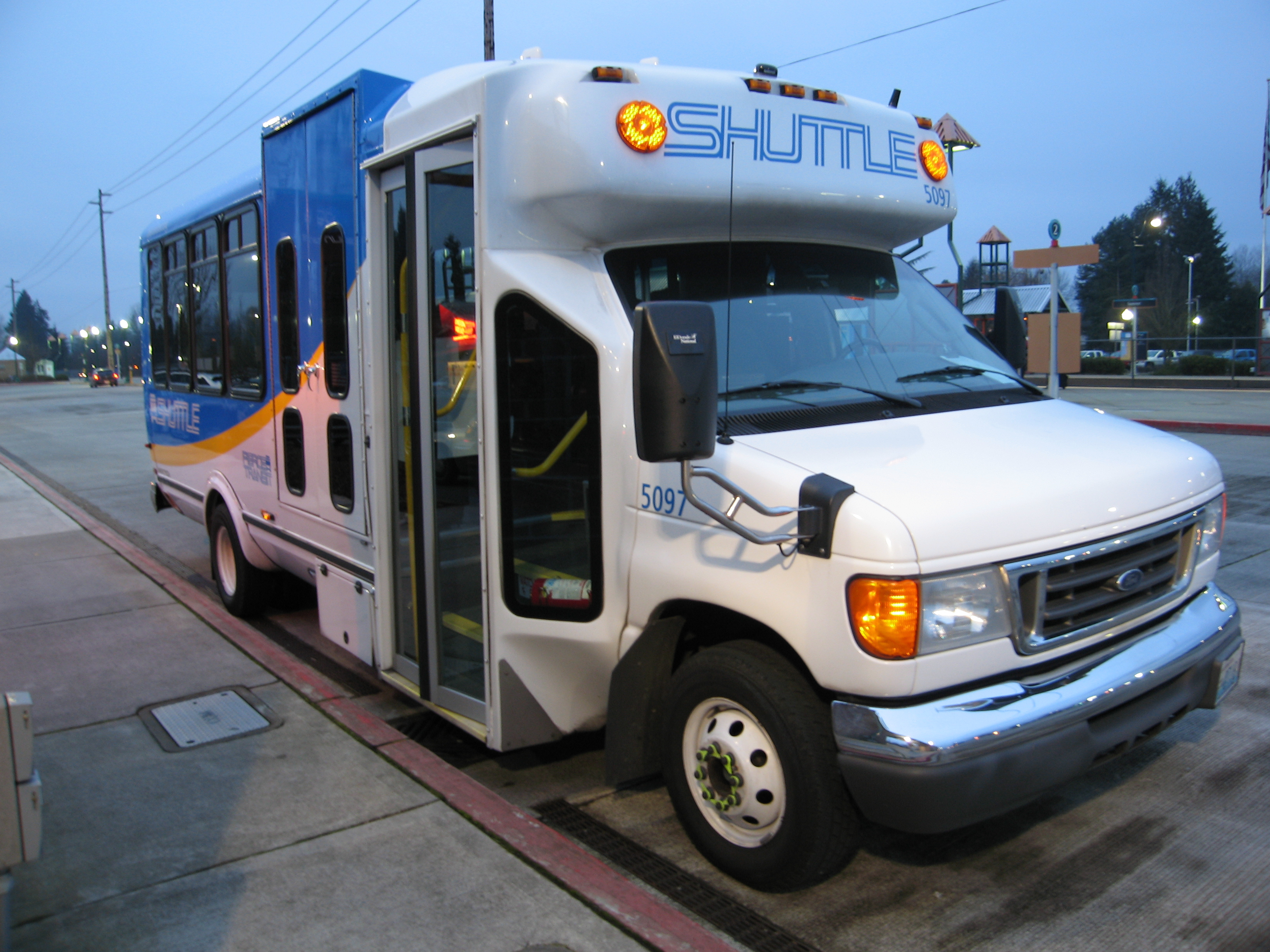
ElDorado Aerotech cutaway for Pierce Transit

In 1983, the company was renamed as the ElDorado Motor Corporation to reflect its diversified offerings, and made an initial public offering in January 1984. ElDorado Motors lost $5 million in 1988 due to decreased demand for recreational vehicles and sold its commercial bus operations to Thor Industries in 1988 to stave off bankruptcy. Thor took the ElDorado bus division, which was based in Salina, Kansas, and went on to combine it with National Coach, acquired in 1991; the two began operating as ElDorado National–Kansas and ElDorado National–California, respectively.

The sale of the commercial bus division was not sufficient and ElDorado Motors filed for bankruptcy in March 1989. The recreational vehicle portion of ElDorado Motors continued in Minneapolis and was reorganized as Honorbuilt Industries, Inc. in 1990. With the help of a consortium of private investors and a federal loan, Honorbuilt resumed production of ElDorado-branded recreational vehicles in October 1990 at its Minneapolis factory; production lasted until 1996, when Honorbuilt was acquired by SMC Corporation and the plant was closed. The RV firm, renamed to SMC Midwest as a wholly owned subsidiary, ceased operations in 1997, although it still existed as a legal entity.

Thor sold ElDorado National to Allied Specialty Vehicles (ASV) when it divested its bus business in August 2013. Other brands included in the sale were Champion Bus, General Coach America, and Goshen Coach. Allied Specialty Vehicles changed its name to REV Group in November 2015. In March 2016, both ElDorado National–California and ElDorado National–Kansas unveiled new logos to distinguish their operations; the Kansas-based manufacturer of light- and medium-duty cutaways was rebranded to ElDorado, while the California-based transit bus manufacturer was rebranded to ENC.

In May 2020, REV Group sold its light- and medium-duty shuttle bus businesses (including ElDorado National–Kansas) to Forest River, but retained the heavy-duty transit and school bus businesses and brands, including ElDorado National–California (ENC) and Collins Bus.
