= All American Group =

Defunct American motor vehicle manufacturer

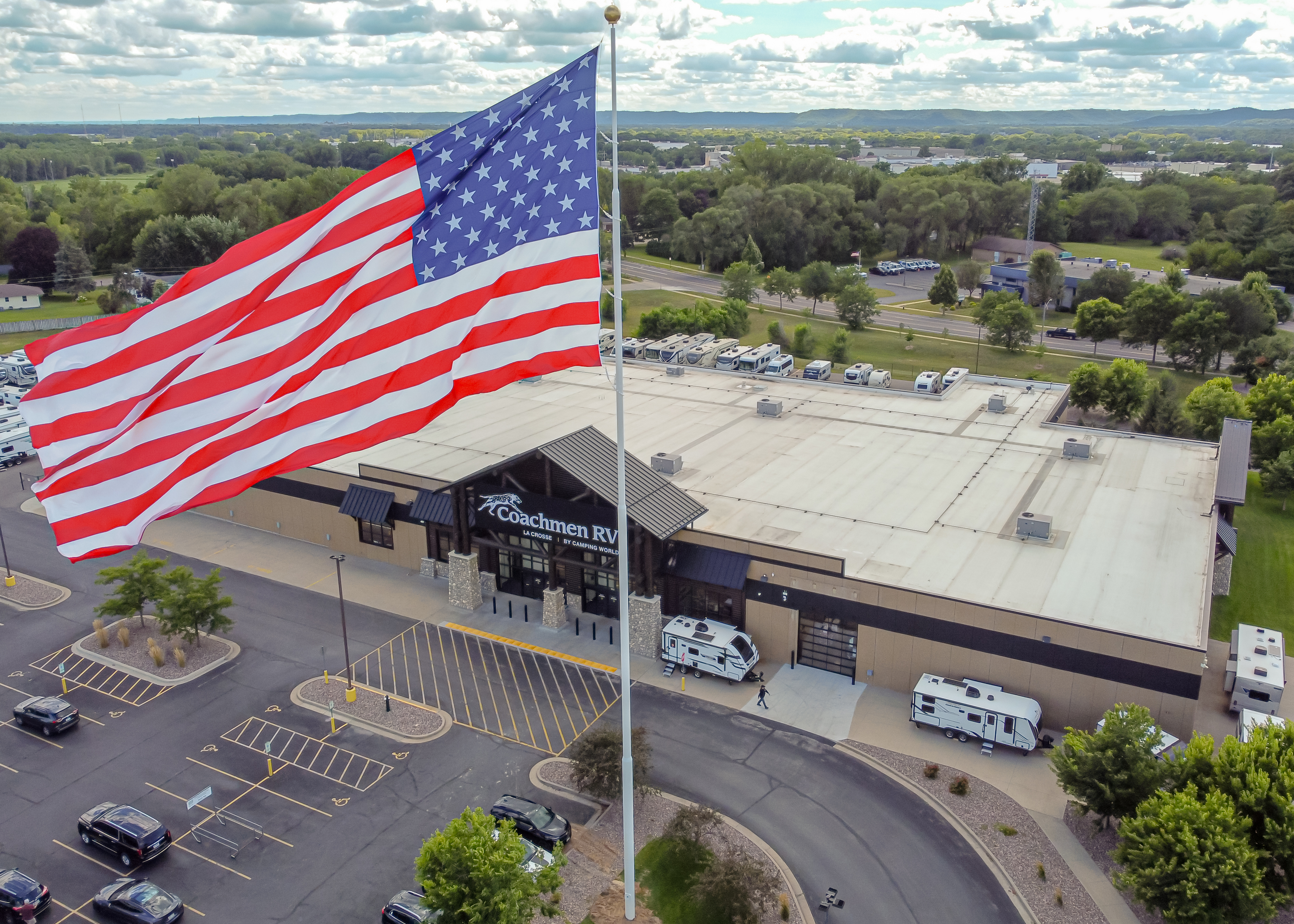
- Coachmen RV in La Crosse, Wisconsin
- Trade name: All American Group
- Formerly: Coachmen Industries Inc
- Founded: 1964
- Defunct: 2016
- Successor: Innovative Building Systems
- Headquarters: Indiana, United States
- Area served: United States
- Products: Class A motorhomes; Class C motorhomes; Modular homes; large scale residential construction projects; fifth wheelers; travel trailers; folding camping trailers
- Brands: Coachmen; Georgie Boy; Sportscoach; Viking; ALL AMERICAN HOMES; MOD-U KRAF
- Revenue: $60.6 million (2009)
- Number of employees: 612 (2009)
- Website: coachmen.com at the Wayback Machine (archived 2008-03-09)

All American Group (formerly Coachmen Industries) was an American company whose divisions produced pre-fabricated housing, recreational vehicles (RVs) and system-built homes. Based in Elkhart, Indiana, it was founded in 1964 as Coachmen Industries. It was listed on the New York Stock Exchange (NYSE) under the symbol COA until 2009, when it was delisted for failing to maintain continued NYSE listing standards.

== History ==
Coachmen Industries was founded by three brothers: Tom Corson, Keith Corson and Claude Corson. The brothers started the company in a 5,000-square-foot (460 m^{2}) plant in downtown Middlebury, Indiana producing 12 travel trailer models, 1 truck camper style and 80 truck caps. Since 1964, Coachmen Companies have produced nearly 600,000 recreational vehicles of all sizes and types.

Following a weakening U.S. economy and rising gas prices, sales within the RV industry dramatically reduced causing financial difficulties for the company. In December 2008, the company sold all of the assets of its RV Group to Forest River, Inc., a unit of Berkshire Hathaway. Following the sale of its recreational vehicles business, Coachmen Industries changed its name to All American Group in 2009. In the same year, HIG Capital extended a $20 million 2-year financing arrangement to Coachmen Industries to support their working capital needs. The financing package comprised a convertible debt of $10 million and a revolving credit line of a further $10 million.

Another division, All American Specialty Vehicles, a joint venture with ARBOC Mobility, manufactured ADA-accessible buses. All American merged into Arboc in 2011.

The company continued to operate in the modular housing business under the ALL AMERICAN HOMES and Mod-U-Kraf brand names. All American was acquired by Innovative Building Systems in 2011. Innovative Building Systems subsequently filed for bankruptcy in 2016 and closed American Homes and Mod-U-Kraf.
