= Trans Tech =

American bus manufacturer

TransTech Bus
- Industry: Transportation, manufacturing
- Predecessor: US Bus
- Founded: November 2007
- Headquarters: 7 Lake Station Road Warwick, New York 10990
- Products: Electric school buses School buses Commercial buses MFSAB buses
- Parent: Forest River, Inc.
- Website: www.transtechbus.com

Trans Tech Bus, a division of Transportation Collaborative Inc., is an American manufacturer of conventional and environmentally friendly electric Type A school buses. Established in 2007 as a successor to the defunct U.S. Bus Corporation, the company produces Type A & Type A-II School Buses and various models of commercial buses, all built on cutaway vehicle chassis.

Trans Tech Bus headquarters and production are located in a 70,000-square-foot (6,500 m^{2}) facility located in Warwick, New York, United States.

== History ==
In November 2007, the shuttered school bus manufacturer U.S. Bus Corporation was reorganized and re-located to Warwick, New York. Renamed Trans Tech Bus, the new company introduced three different models of school buses. Single and dual rear wheel models were based on Ford and GM van chassis, while the medium-duty model was built on a GM medium-duty truck chassis. The medium-duty bus was discontinued after 2009 following the end of General Motors production of the C4500/5500 chassis.

For 2012, the Trans Tech model line saw a complete redesign. The new ST Aero, SST, and Roadstar feature a redesigned bodyshell with a focus on aerodynamics. The CST (Child-Safe Transporter) is a version of the SST available for MFSAB (Multi-Function School Activity Bus) use.

A new bus on Ford Transit chassis was introduced. and was set to begin production in April 2017 named "Trans Star" with up to 20 passengers.

Since 2026, Trans Tech introduced the Nexbus brand with a brand new Type A school bus like the SL400, SH400, DH400, DH500 and so much more.

== Models ==
2026-Present

Pictures of the specific buses	
Available versions	School bus
Configuration	Type A
Chassis provider	General Motors: Chevrolet Express; GMC Savana
Notes	Single and dual rear-wheel Type A school bus

2012–2026

Model name	ST Aero	SST	Roadstar	Trans Star	eTrans
Pictures of the specific buses					
Available versions	School bus	School bus; MFSAB (CST)	School bus	School bus MFSAB	School bus
Configuration	Type A	Type A	Type A	Type A	Type A-2
Chassis provider	General Motors: Chevrolet Express; GMC Savana	Ford Motor Company: E-350; E-450; General Motors: Chevrolet Express; GMC Savana		Ford Motor Company Transit	Motiv Power Systems
Notes	Single rear-wheel Type A school bus	Standard dual rear-wheel Type A bus; MFSAB model sold as CST (Child-Safe Transporter)	Narrow-body dual-wheel Type A school bus	Narrow-body SRW and DRW both Type A bus	Battery-powered fully electric school bus

2007-2011

Model bame	Single rear wheel	Dual rear wheel	Medium-duty
Pictures of the specific buses	Trans Tech SRW	Trans Tech DRW	Medium Duty Trans Tech
Available versions	School bus; Commercial bus; MFSAB (activity bus)	School bus; Commercial bus; MFSAB (activity bus)	School bus; Commercial bus; MFSAB (activity bus)
Configuration	Type A	Type A	Type A-2
Maximum seating capacity	20	34 (Ford); 30 (GM)	42
Chassis provider	Ford Motor Company: Ford E-350; General Motors: Chevrolet Express; GMC Savana	Ford Motor Company: Ford E-350; Ford E-450; General Motors: Chevrolet Express; GMC Savana	General Motors: Chevrolet/GMC C4500/5500

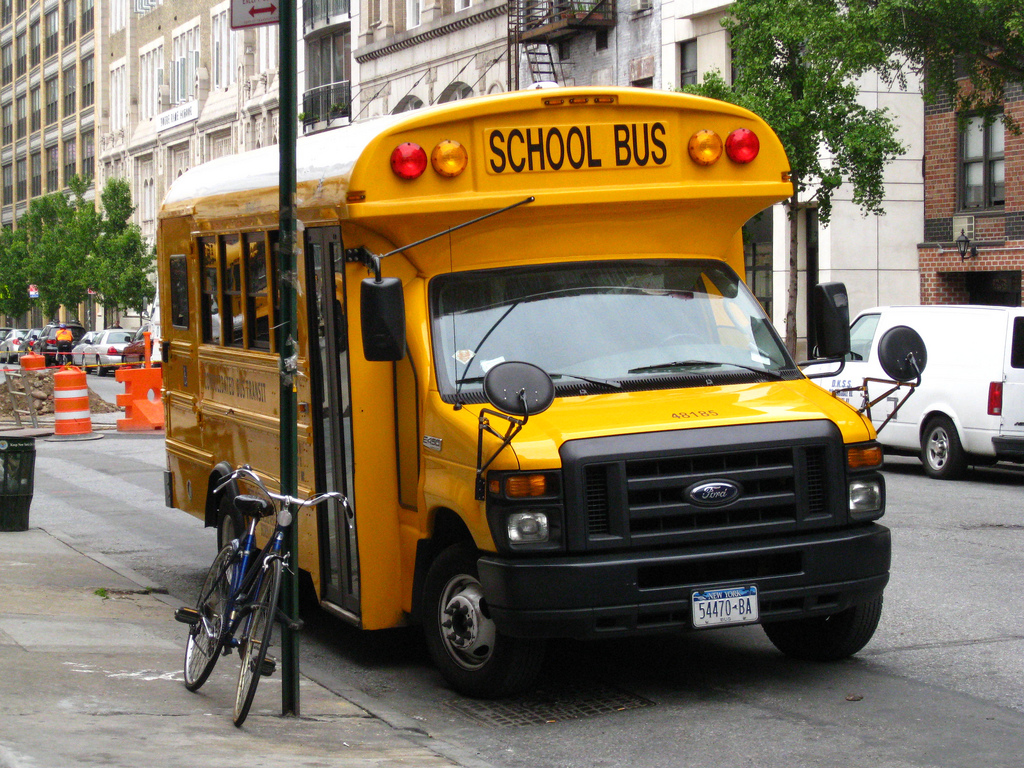
Trans Tech dual rear wheel on Ford E-450 chassis

TransTech Bus has a flexible manufacturing facility which allow a wide variety of options. TransTech buses may include:

- Flat-floor configurations
- Wheelchair lifts (Ricon, Braun, etc.)
- Track Seating (L-track or slide-track)
- Air conditioning (Bus-Air, MCC, ACT, etc.)
- Acoustic ceilings
- Child check systems
- Camera installations
- Electric bi-fold doors (including street-side bi-fold mounting)
- Complete LED lighting options
- Vandal lock systems

=== e-Trans ===
In October 2011, at the yearly conference of the National Association of Pupil Transportation, Trans Tech debuted the first factory-built battery-powered electric school bus. A 42-passenger vehicle based on the Newton electric truck from Smith Electric Vehicles. With the chassis manufactured in the Bronx, New York City, the entire bus was manufactured in New York State. A set of two lithium-ion batteries give the eTrans an approximate range of up to 130 miles between charges, taking an average of eight hours to fully recharge. This initial vehicle was never certified to operate, and the grant project was later taken over by Motiv Power Systems. The Motiv Powered SSTe has been shown at shows including the Green California Summit and is commercially available from TransTech.
