= GreenPower Motor Company =

Canadian electric bus manufacturer

GreenPower Motor Company Inc.
- Type: Public
- Traded as: TSX-V: GPV; Nasdaq: GP
- Industry: Transportation
- Founded: 2010; 16 years ago
- Headquarters: Vancouver, British Columbia, Canada, Canada
- Number of locations: Vancouver, Canada; Rancho Cucamonga, California, U.S.; Porterville, California, U.S.
- Area served: North America
- Key people: Brendan Riley (president)
- Number of employees: 52
- Subsidiaries: Electric Vehicle Logistics Inc.; GreenPower Manufacturing WV Inc.; GreenPower Motor Company, Inc.; Lion Truck Body Incorporated; San Joaquin Valley Equipment Leasing, Inc.
- Website: greenpowermotor.com

GreenPower Motor Company Inc. is a Canadian electric bus manufacturer and distributor in North America. The company fabricates multiple zero-emission models, including transit buses, school buses, and double decker buses. GreenPower headquarters are in Vancouver, British Columbia, with a sales office in Rancho Cucamonga, California; an assembly facility in Porterville, California; and a production facility in South Charleston, West Virginia. Its stock is traded on Nasdaq the United States.

Its subsidiaries include Electric Vehicle Logistics Inc., GreenPower Industries Inc., GreenPower Manufacturing WV Inc., GreenPower Motor Company, Inc., Green-Power Private Ltd., Lion Truck Body Incorporated, and San Joaquin Valley Equipment Leasing, Inc.

== History ==
GreenPower was incorporated in Canada in 2010 to manufacture affordable electric buses and vans.

In 2014, GreenPower launched an EV350 model, a 40-foot (12 m), all-electric transit bus combining electric drive and battery technologies with a lightweight chassis and low-floor body. The EV350 was designed by Xiamen Fengtai Bus & Coach International Co., Ltd in China. It was assembled by Fengtai and imported in July 2014 through the Port of Long Beach. The prototype unit was subsequently used as a demonstration unit for transit agencies in the western United States and Canada.

In 2016, the Greater Victoria Harbour Authority and CVS Tours in Victoria, British Columbia purchased a double-decker EV550 bus from GreenPower for US$1.3 million. It was the first purpose-built double-decker electric bus in North America. The EV550 seats 100 passengers, plus standees, and has a range of over 300 miles (480 km).

In 2016, the company acquired a 9.3-acre (3.8 ha) plot on Hope Drive in Porterville, California, to build a 150,000-square-foot (14,000 m^{2}) manufacturing facility for roughly $10 million. The firm stated it would initially have sixty employees, but project growth to 1,000 workers. In March 2017, the City of Porterville, California, ordered ten GreenPower EV350 buses and charging infrastructure for nine million dollars. With this purchase, Porterville became the first municipality to operate an all-electric and zero-emission transit fleet in California. However, in April 2021, GreenPower had yet to construct its manufacturing facility.

In the fall of 2016. GreenPower released Synapse, the line of all-electric school and shuttle buses. The Synapse has a 30-foot (9.1 m) model that seats 37 passengers and a 36.5-foot (11.1 m) model that seats 49 passengers. The California Air Resources Board approved the Synapse for its Hybrid and Zero-Emission Truck and Bus Voucher Incentive Project. This approval meant purchasers of the Synapse would earn a $95,000 incentive, in addition to other, previously existing incentives. In August 2017, GreenPower sold eleven Synapse buses to six schools in the North Coast Unified Air Quality Management District and South Coast Air Quality Management District in California.

In 2018, GreenPower launched the EV Star minibus in 2018. The EV Star can travel between 150–200 miles (240–320 km) per charge; charging takes eight hours with a J1172 Level 2 charger or ninety minutes with a DC fast charger. Several interior configurations are possible, including one that seats seventeen passengers. The University of California, San Francisco purchased two EV Stars. Its cost ranges from US$190,000 to US$240,000 before federal and state incentives.

In 2020, the Thermalito Union Elementary School District in Thermalito, California ordered six BEAST (Battery Electric Automotive School Transportation) school buses from GreenPower. Delivered in December, the purpose-built 40-foot school buses have a range of up to 150 miles (240 km). According to a GreenPower statement, it was the company's largest delivery of school buses to date.

In August 2020, GreenPower issued stock through Nasdaq; shares started at $8, rose to $34, and declined to $18 by April 2021. Delays in the company's growth were in part due to GreenPower's "refusal to carry out accepted crash tests on their large buses—a requirement for federal funds that transit agencies use to buy the vehicles." In addition, GreenPower's vehicles are manufactured in China, with minor modifications being made in the United States, meaning they were not compliant with President Biden's "Buy America" program. The federal government gives agencies funds towards electric bus purchases, but 75% of the vehicle's parts must be made in the United States to comply to Buy America.

In 2021, GreenPower entered into an exclusive agreement with Forest River, a manufacturer of cutaway minibusses and recreational vehicles. GreenPower EV Star cabs and chassis to Forest River.

In August 2022, GreenPower opened a production facility in the South Charleston Industrial Park in South Charleston, West Virginia. GreenPower leased an 80,000-square-foot (7,400 m^{2}) building where it plans to manufacture electric buses. The Workforce Development Board of Kanawha County, West Virginia offered BridgeValley Community and Technical College students funding for training, transportation, books, and childcare to prepare for employment with GreenPower.

== Vehicles ==
=== Minibuses ===
- EV Star
- EV Star Max seating
- EV Star Cargo
- EV Star Cab
- EV Star CC

=== School bus ===
- BEAST. (Battery Electric Automotive School Transportation)
- Nano BEAST
- Synapse

=== Transit and coach buses ===
- EV250
- EV350
- EV500
- EV550 (double-decker)
