= U.S. Bus Corporation =

American school bus manufacturer

- Founded: 1995
- Defunct: 2007
- Successor: Trans Tech
- Headquarters: Suffern, New York, United States

U.S. Bus Corporation was a manufacturer of Type A (cutaway cab) school buses and non-school buses based in Suffern, New York. These school buses were sometimes used by churches and day care centers. U.S. Bus became Trans Tech in November 2007.

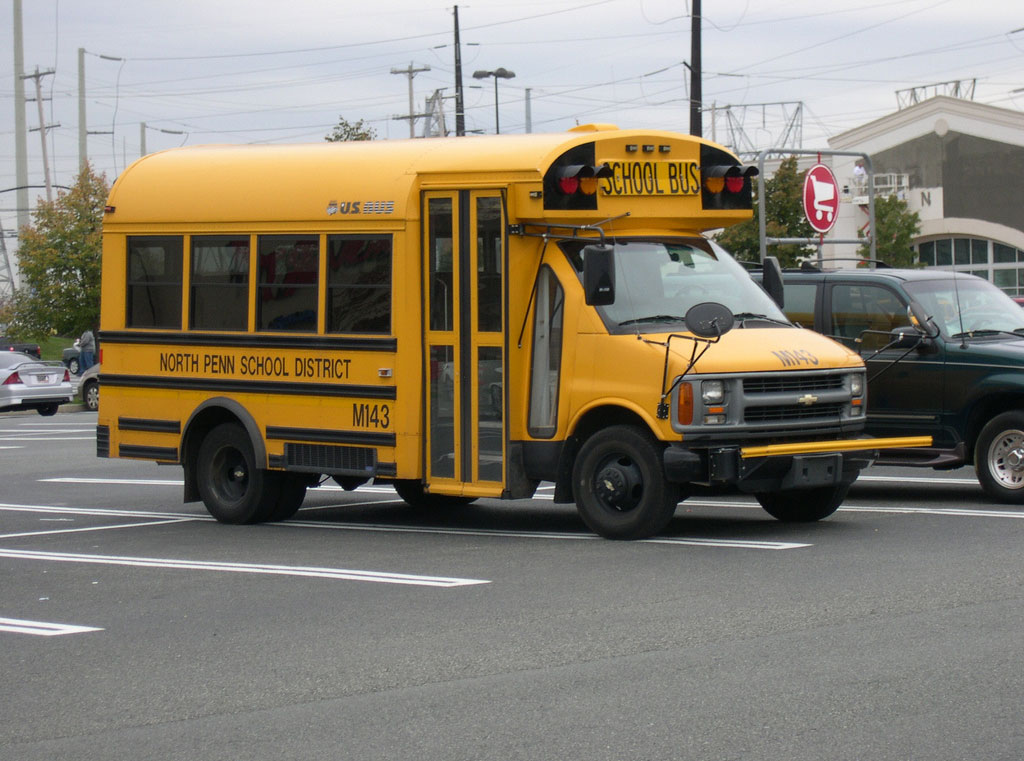
U.S. Bus body with Chevrolet chassis

== Products ==
Model	Chassis	Vehicle type	Notes	Photos
Metrovan	Chevrolet	School bus	SRW	MetroVan
Safetran	Chevrolet	School bus	SRW	US Bus Safetran
Sturdibus	Chevrolet Ford	School bus MFSAB	DRW	US Bus Sturdibus
Sturdibus HD	Chevrolet	School bus MFSAB	Chevrolet 5500	SturdiBus HD 5500
Sturdivan	Dodge	School bus	SRW	Sturdivan
Universe	Chevrolet Ford	School bus MFSAB	SRW	Universe

== See also ==
- Trans Tech - successor company
