= Motiv Power Systems =

Manufacturer of electric powertrains for commercial vehicles

- Industry: Electric vehicles
- Founded: 2009
- Founder: Jim Castelaz
- Headquarters: Foster City, California, United States of America

Motiv Power Systems is an American manufacturer of all-electric chassis for medium-duty commercial vehicles, based in Foster City, California.

== History ==
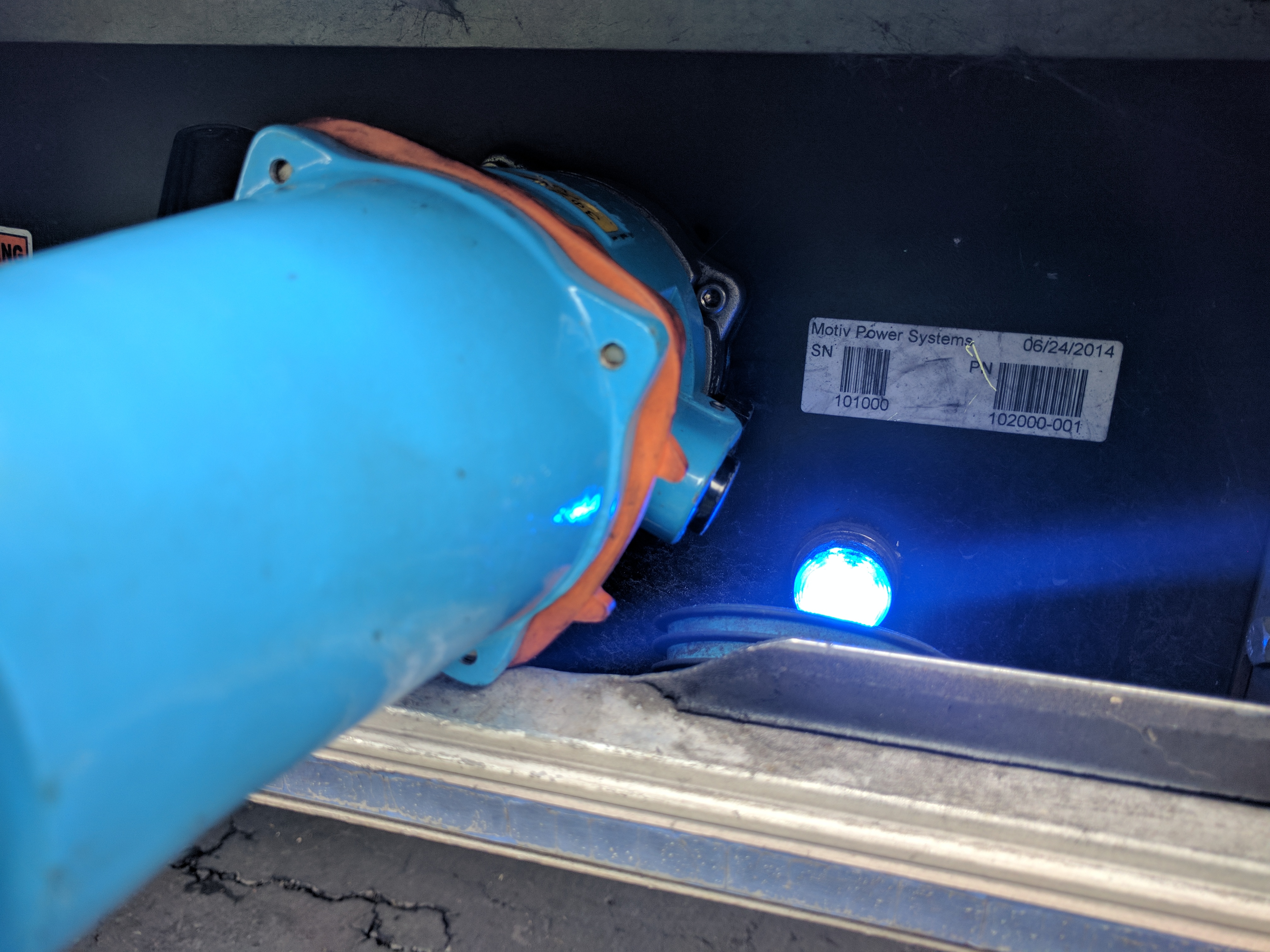
A charging connection on a vehicle with a Motiv Power Systems drivetrain.

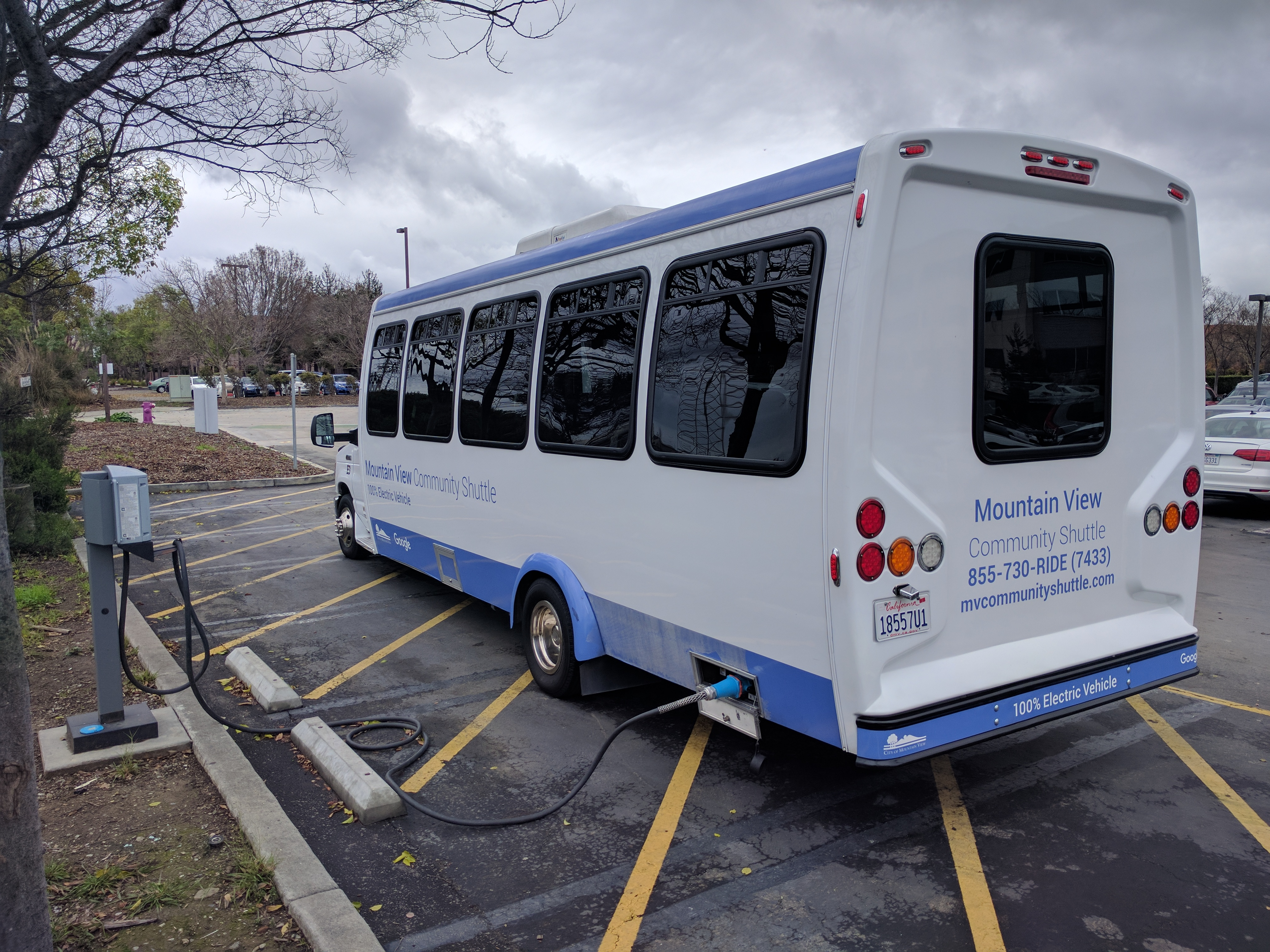
One of the Mountain View community shuttles charging in a Google parking lot.

Jim Castelaz founded Motiv in 2009, working from his residence in Mountain View, California.

In 2012, the company won a grant from the California Energy Commission to research and build a prototype manufacturing facility for its powertrain system, with a stated goal to "de-risk" the process of converting vehicles to an all-electric system.

Motiv's first major contract was with the city of Chicago to convert 20 garbage trucks to use only electric power, starting work in 2012, with the first truck deployed in the middle of 2014. Motiv estimated that Chicago could prevent the release of 10,000 tons of carbon emissions per year by converting one quarter of its garbage trucks in this manner. Chicago paid for the trucks on a sliding scale, with the sale of the first trucks at $1.3 million, and the final ten trucks at $500,000.

Then, in 2013, Motiv partnered with New York company Trans Tech to create an electric school bus for the Kings Canyon Unified School District, which went into service in March 2014. The school district paid Motiv $230,000 for two "SST-e" Type A buses, with two more to follow. The buses can travel 80–100 miles, and carry 18–25 students each.

Motiv also worked with Google in early 2015 to fund electric shuttles in Mountain View, based on existing vehicle designs. These trucks are still actively being used in Mountain View, California and are free to ride for the public

Then, in 2016, Motiv partnered with California Truck Equipment Co. and Rockport Commercial Vehicles to offer all-electric work trucks and box trucks, respectively. The first all-electric CTEC work truck was delivered to Santa Ana that year.

In 2017 Motiv was approved as a Ford Qualified Vehicle Modifier (eQVM) for electric powertrains for commercial work trucks and buses.

In 2018 Motiv launched its EPIC (Electric Powered Intelligent Chassis) family of all-electric chassis. The EPIC chassis received CARB E.O. Certification for 2018/2019 in March 2018. This CARB certification was an industry first for an incomplete vehicle construction and led by Motiv's Director of Business Development Urvi Nagrani. Prior to this certification, all electric vehicles certified for sale in California were constructed with a single manufacturer certifying the final vehicle in applications such as transit buses or passenger cars. Work trucks which tend to be built on certified chassis configurations from major manufacturers like Ford, Freightliner, Volvo, and more relied on regulatory pass throughs that were not available in electric vehicles until 2018. After Motiv got this certification, the process at CARB continued to evolve through the Zero Emission Powertrain Certification regulatory workgroups. These workgroups which Motiv continued to participate in through 2018 and 2019 ultimately lead to CARB clarifying its regulations and passing specific certifications for zero-emissions vehicles and powertrains for both electric and fuel cell vehicles in 2020. Also in 2018 Motiv launched a new partnership with RV manufacturer Winnebago beginning with the launch of all electric lung screening clinic at the Global Climate Action Summit in San Francisco. The all-electric Mobile Lung Unit (eMLU) was built on a Ford F-53 based EPI6 all-electric chassis from Motiv Power Systems, with Samsung's NeuroLogica BodyTom Elite a portable, full-body, 32-slice CT scanner. These specialty vehicles were preceded by the announcement of an all electric bloodmobile.

In 2019 Motiv's founder and CEO Jim Castelaz stepped down into a CTO role and Motiv's Board Chair Matt O'Leary became the CEO. Matt O'Leary had worked at Ford for 38 years, including the colaunch of the Ford F150 in 2015 when they moved to aluminum bodies to meet emissions standards. Soon after, Motiv raised $60 million in a round lead with an investment from RV manufacturer Winnebago

In 2021 Motiv raised $20 million to expand manufacturing Matt O'Leary served as CEO until 2021 when Tim Krauskopf was brought in and O'Leary resumed his role on the board.

In 2024, Motiv unveiled its Argo modular electric truck platform at ACT Expo. The platform introduced a medium-duty chassis designed for commercial fleet applications.
