= ENC E-Z Rider =

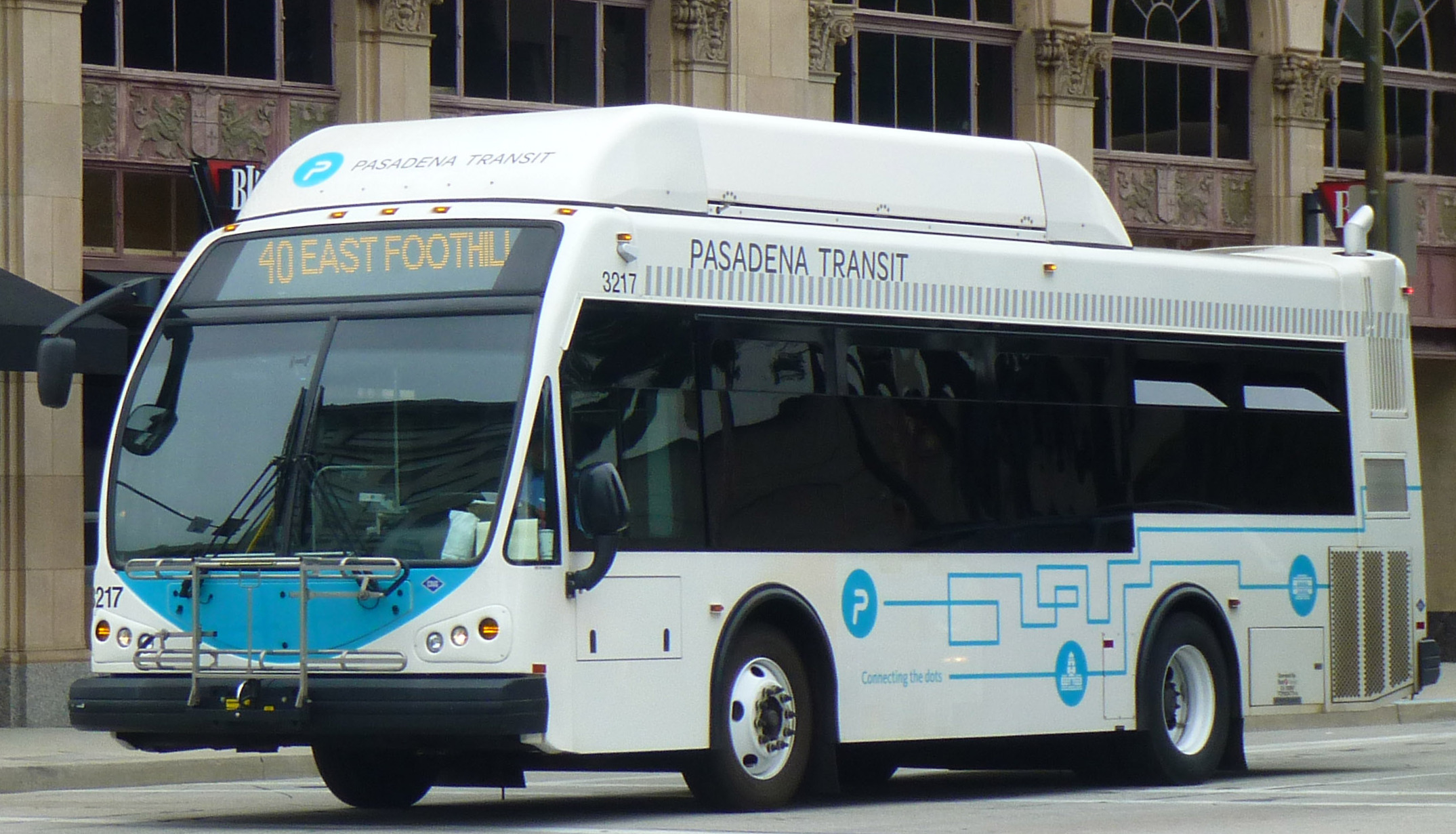
- Current model, E-Z Rider II BRT operated by Pasadena Transit

Overview
- Manufacturer: ENC
- Production: 1996–2001 (E-Z Rider); 2001–2007 (E-Z Rider II); 2005–2014 (E-Z Rider II MAX); 2008+ (E-Z Rider II BRT)
- Assembly: Riverside, California

Body and chassis
- Class: Transit bus
- Body style: Low-floor, mid-sized, heavy-duty bus
- Layout: Rear-engine, rear-wheel-drive

Powertrain
- Engine: Diesel: Cummins B6.7; CNG/LNG: Cummins L9N
- Transmission: Allison B 300, B 400 or H 40 (hybrid); Voith; ZF

Dimensions
- Wheelbase: 152 in (3.86 m) (30' E-Z Rider); 160 in (4.06 m) (30' E-Z Rider II); 168 in (4.27 m) (32'); 220 in (5.59 m) (35')
- Length: 30 ft 7 in (9.32 m) (30'); 31 ft 3 in (9.53 m) (32'); 35 ft 7 in (10.85 m) (35')
- Width: 102 in (2.59 m)
- Height: 128 in (3.25 m) (diesel); 136 in (3.45 m) (CNG/Hybrid)
- Curb weight: 27,400 lb (12,400 kg) (30' CNG); 29,910 lb (13,600 kg) (32' CNG); 31,370 lb (14,200 kg) (35' diesel)

The ENC E-Z Rider and its successor E-Z Rider II are a line of low-floor, mid-sized, heavy-duty transit buses available in 30', 32', and 35' nominal lengths manufactured by ENC (formerly ElDorado National–California) in Riverside, California starting from 1996. In addition to the different lengths, the buses are available with several powertrain options including traditional diesel, CNG, LNG, Propane, and diesel-electric hybrid.

The initial E-Z Rider was offered from 1996 to 2001. ENC marketed its successor, the E-Z Rider II, from 2001 to 2007. From 2005 until 2014 ENC also offered a restyled model as the E-Z Rider II MAX. The most recent and currently sold version is the E-Z Rider II BRT with bus rapid transit styling and features, which was introduced in 2008.

== Design ==
ElDorado National filed an application in 1994 to trademark the name E-Z Rider, and the cited date of first use is June 1996. It was the first low-floor bus from ElDorado, and is deployed typically as a shuttle bus for universities, airport hotels, small transit fleets, and car rental services, but also has been used as a heavy-duty transit bus, as it was designed to the required 12 year/500,000-mile STURAA life. Like most low-floor buses offered in North America, the E-Z Rider and E-Z Rider II have a partial low-floor layout, where the seating area from the rear axle to the back of the bus is on an elevated platform to provide space for the engine and transmission.

=== Updates ===
The E-Z Rider was offered in a single 30' nominal length, with a wheelbase of 152 in (3.9 m). Several different floorplans were offered to accommodate 20 to 29 seated passengers. Floor height varied from 14 in (360 mm) at the door to 11 in (280 mm) while kneeled.

The E-Z Rider II is offered in three different lengths (30', 32', 35' nominal). Compared to the original E-Z Rider, the E-Z Rider II has larger-diameter wheels 22.5 in (570 mm); E-Z Rider: 19.5 in (500 mm), and the floor height at the entry doors has increased slightly to 14 3/8 in (370 mm). The wheelbase of the E-Z Rider II (and the MAX and BRT variants) has been extended to 160, 168, 220 in (4.1, 4.3, 5.6 m) for the 30', 32', and 35' models, respectively. The front and rear overhangs of the BRT measure 91.5 and 115 in (2.32 and 2.92 m), respectively.

Initial versions of the E-Z Rider II were styled similarly to the E-Z Rider, with quad sealed-beam headlights. Later, the E-Z Rider II was restyled with small round projector headlights; the MAX can be distinguished by the slight upward tilt (at the outer corners) of its headlight array compared to the original II. The BRT uses a front end and windshield that is canted backward for streamlining.

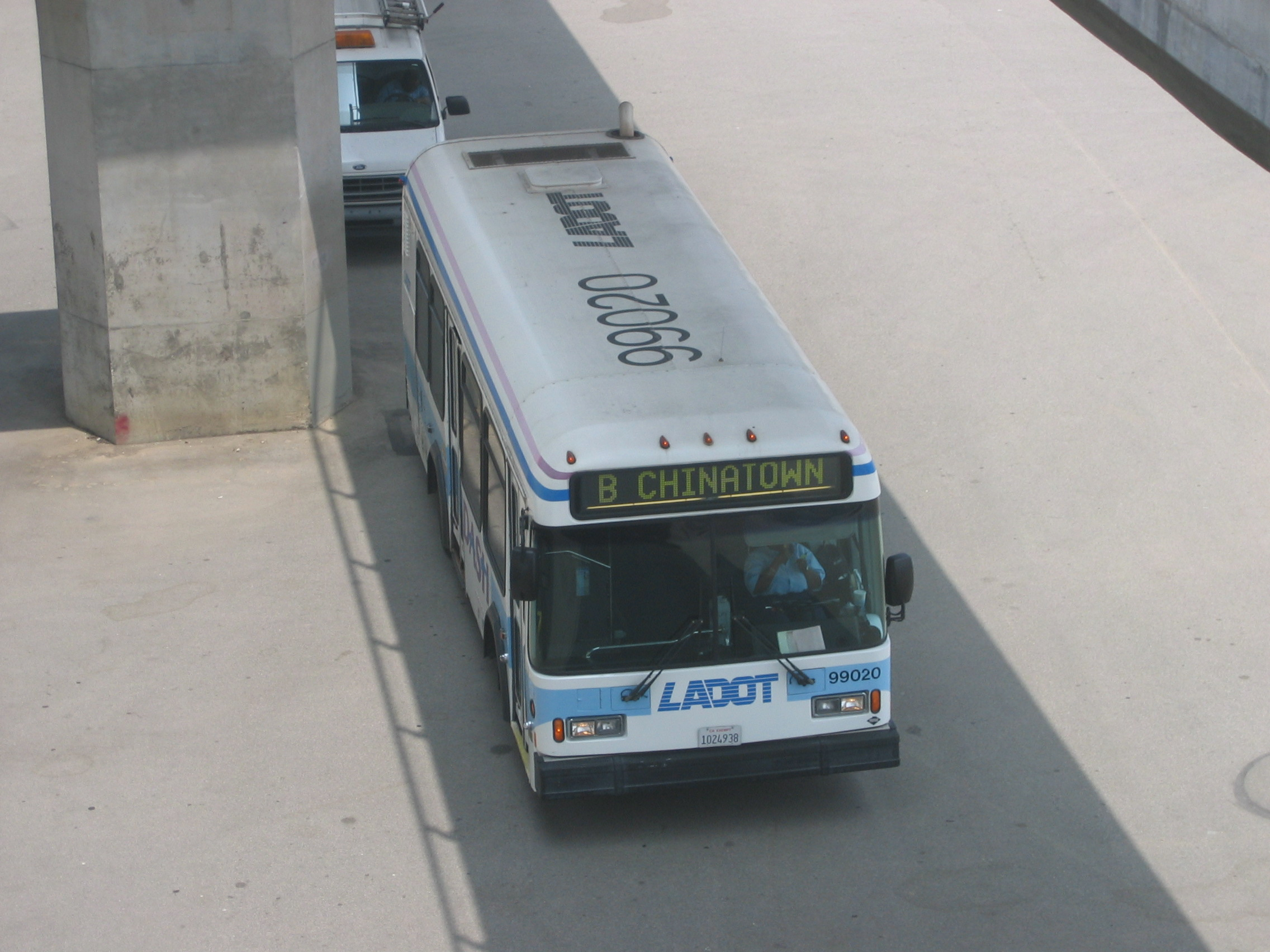
E-Z Rider (LADOT)

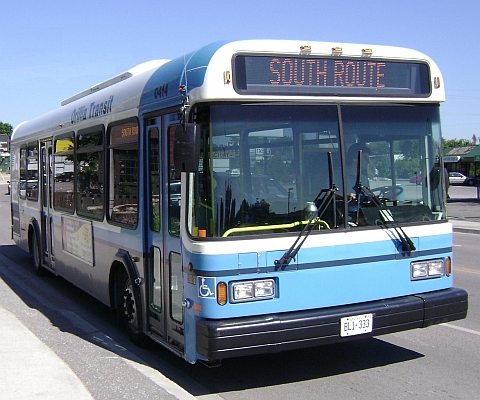
E-Z Rider II (original, Orillia Transit)

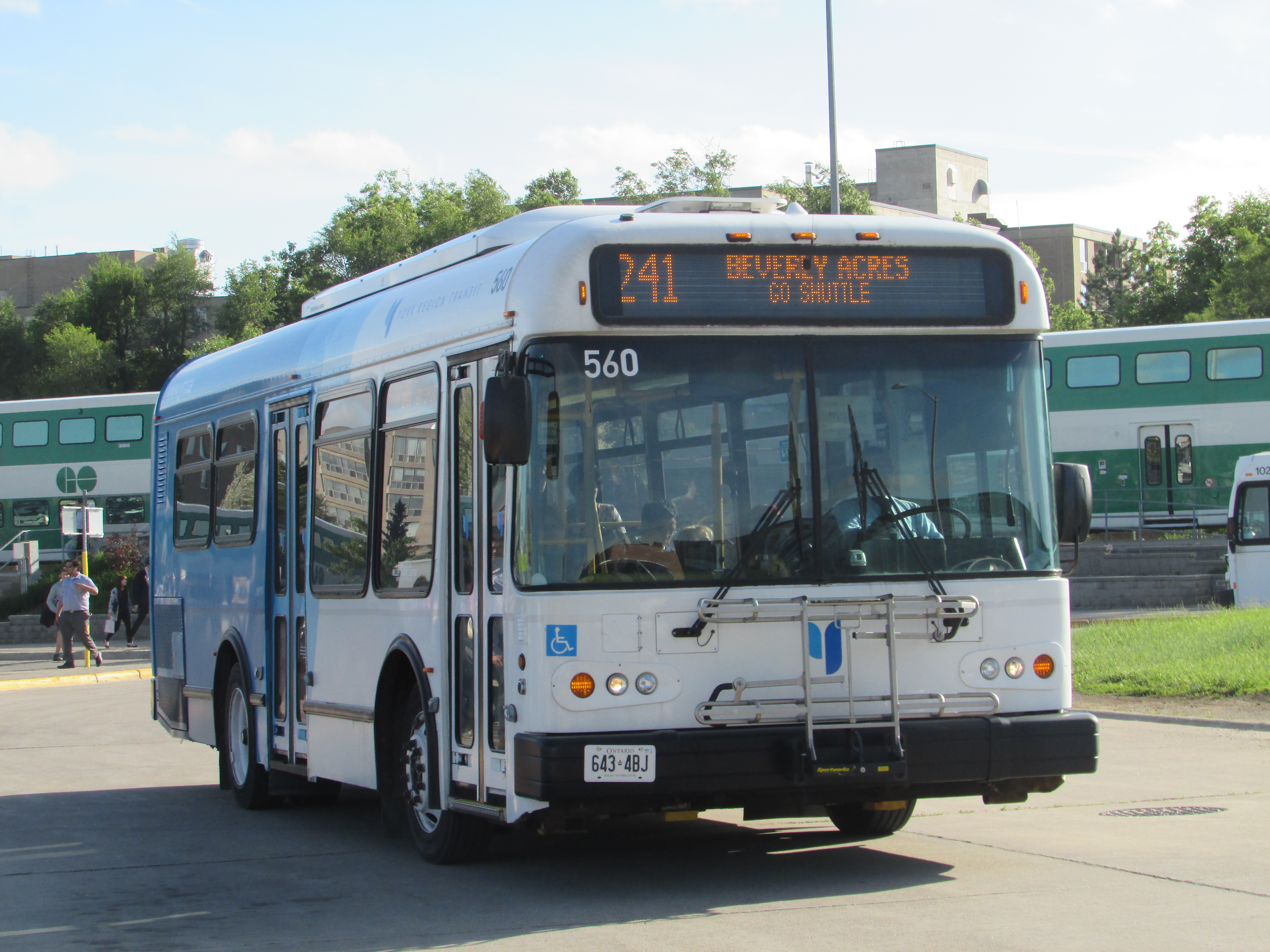
E-Z Rider II (restyled, York Region Transit)

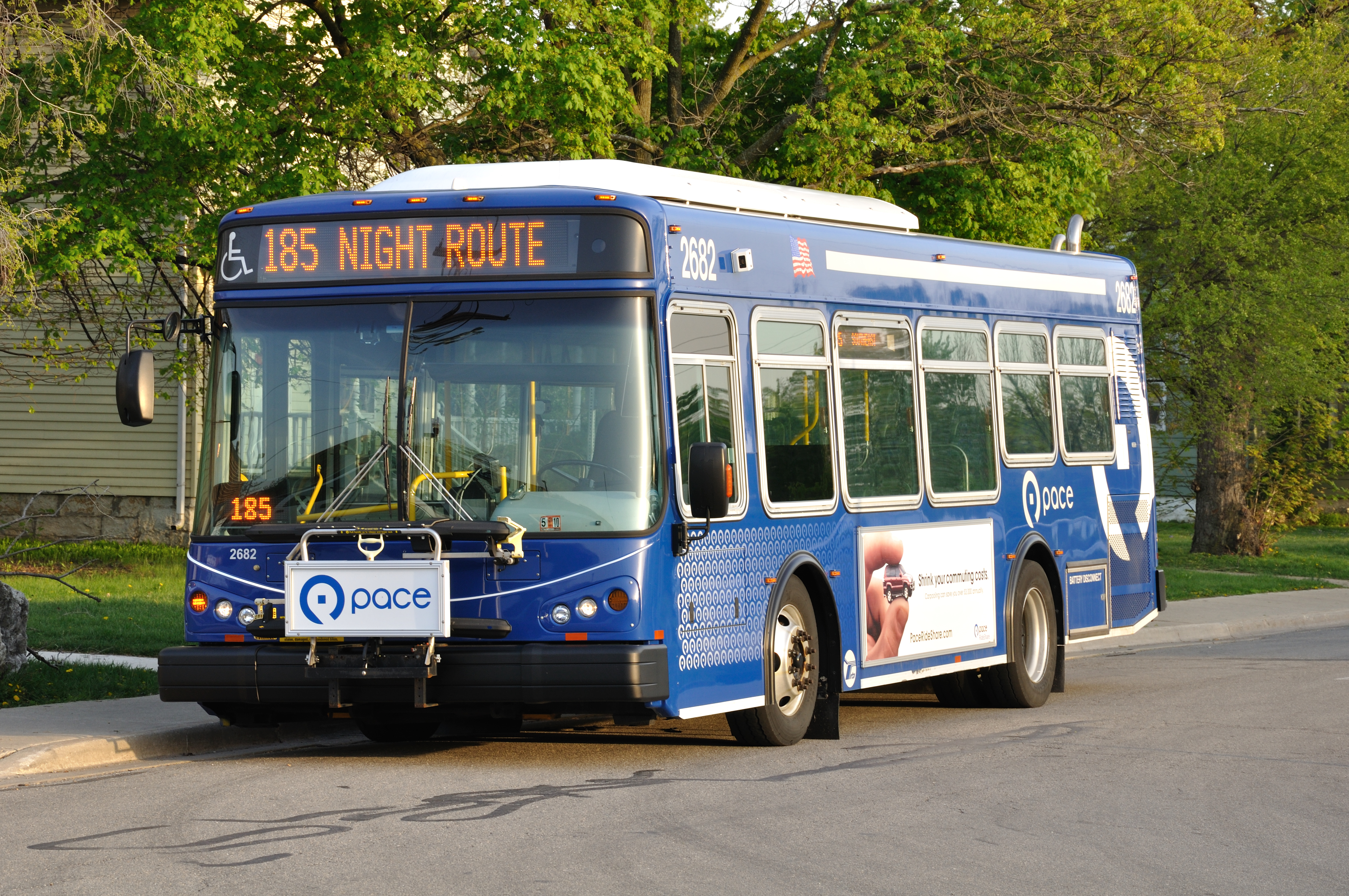
E-Z Rider II MAX (Pace)

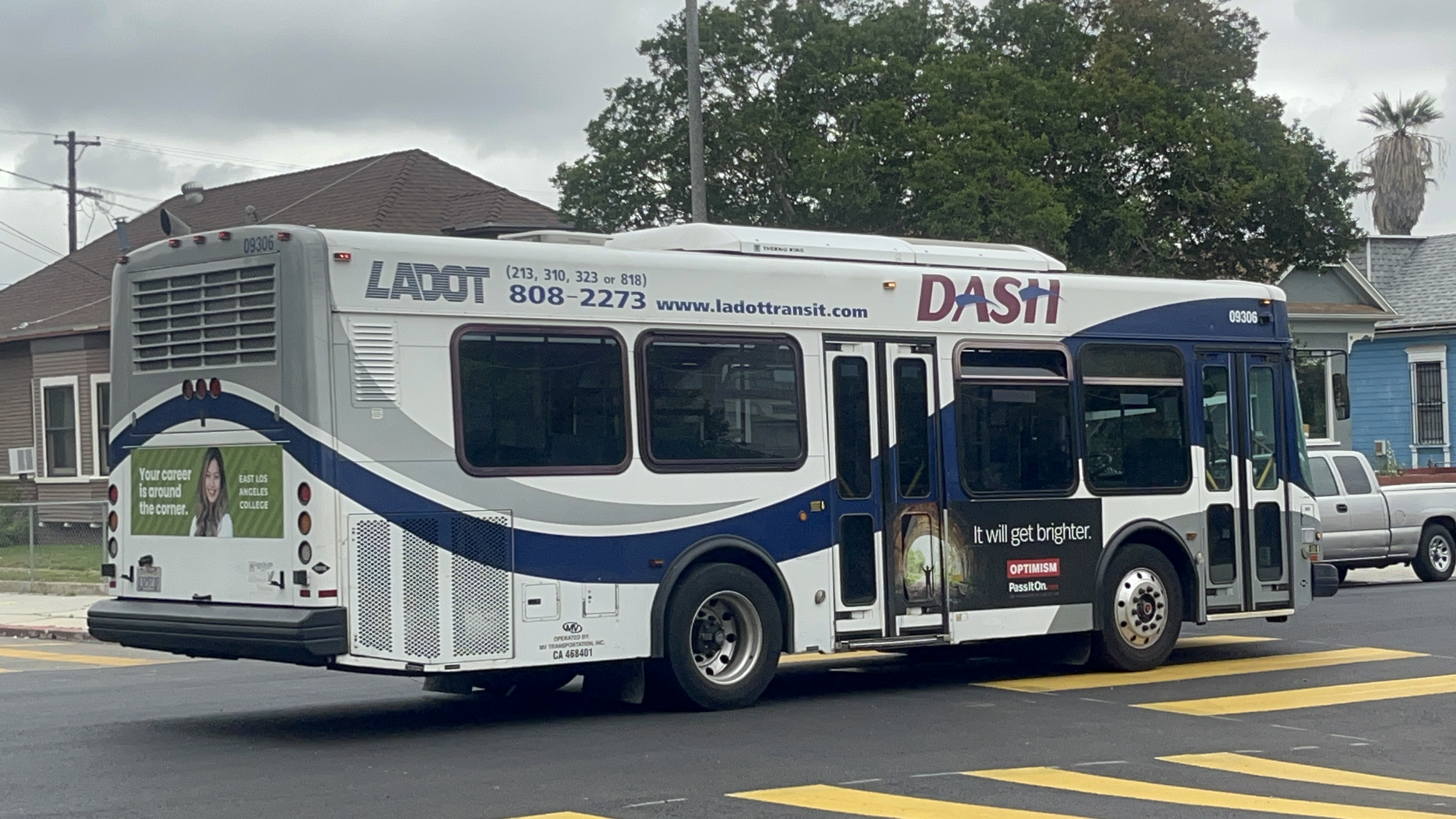
Rear of E-Z Rider II MAX (LADOT)

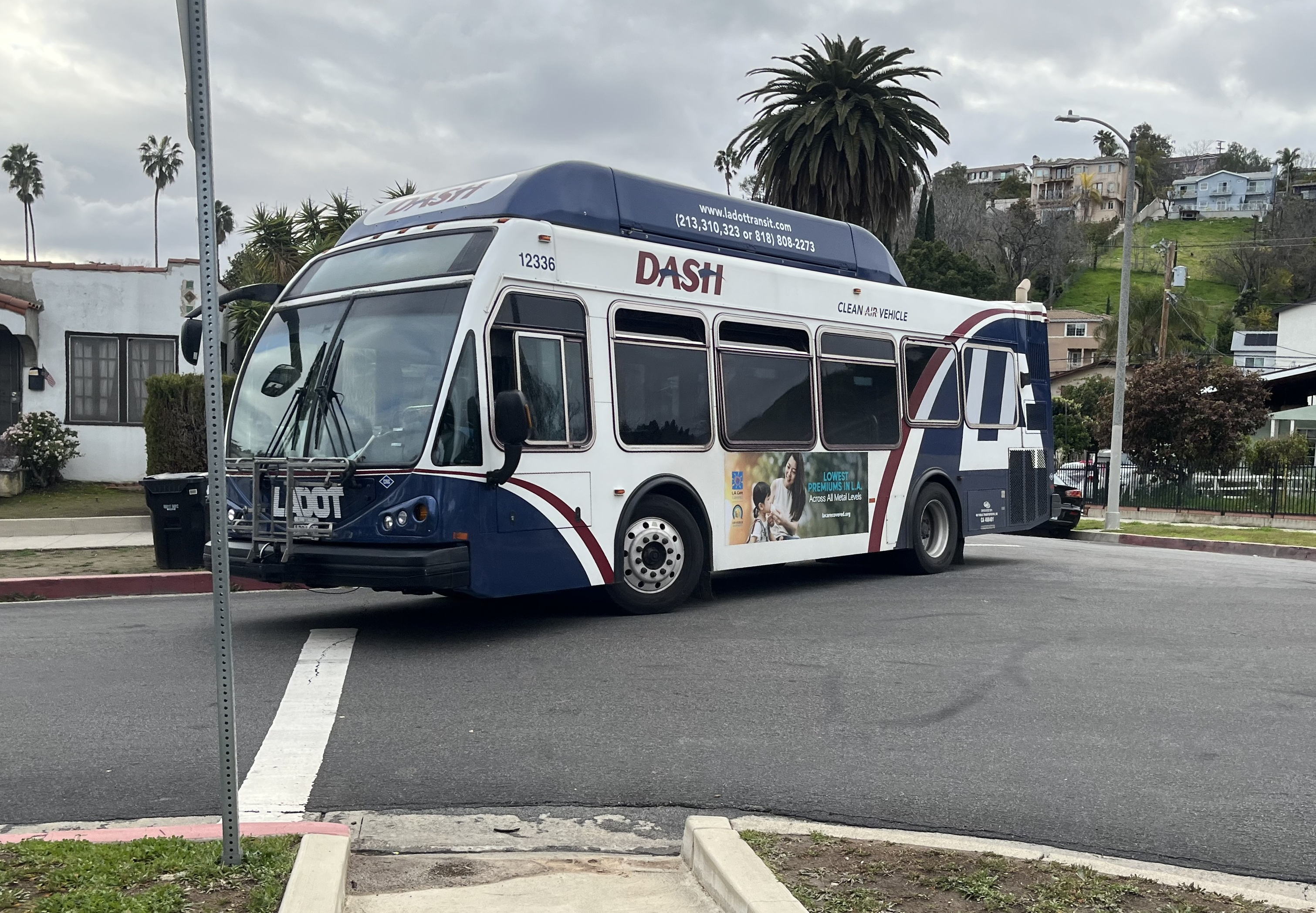
E-Z Rider II BRT (LADOT DASH)

=== Hybrid ===
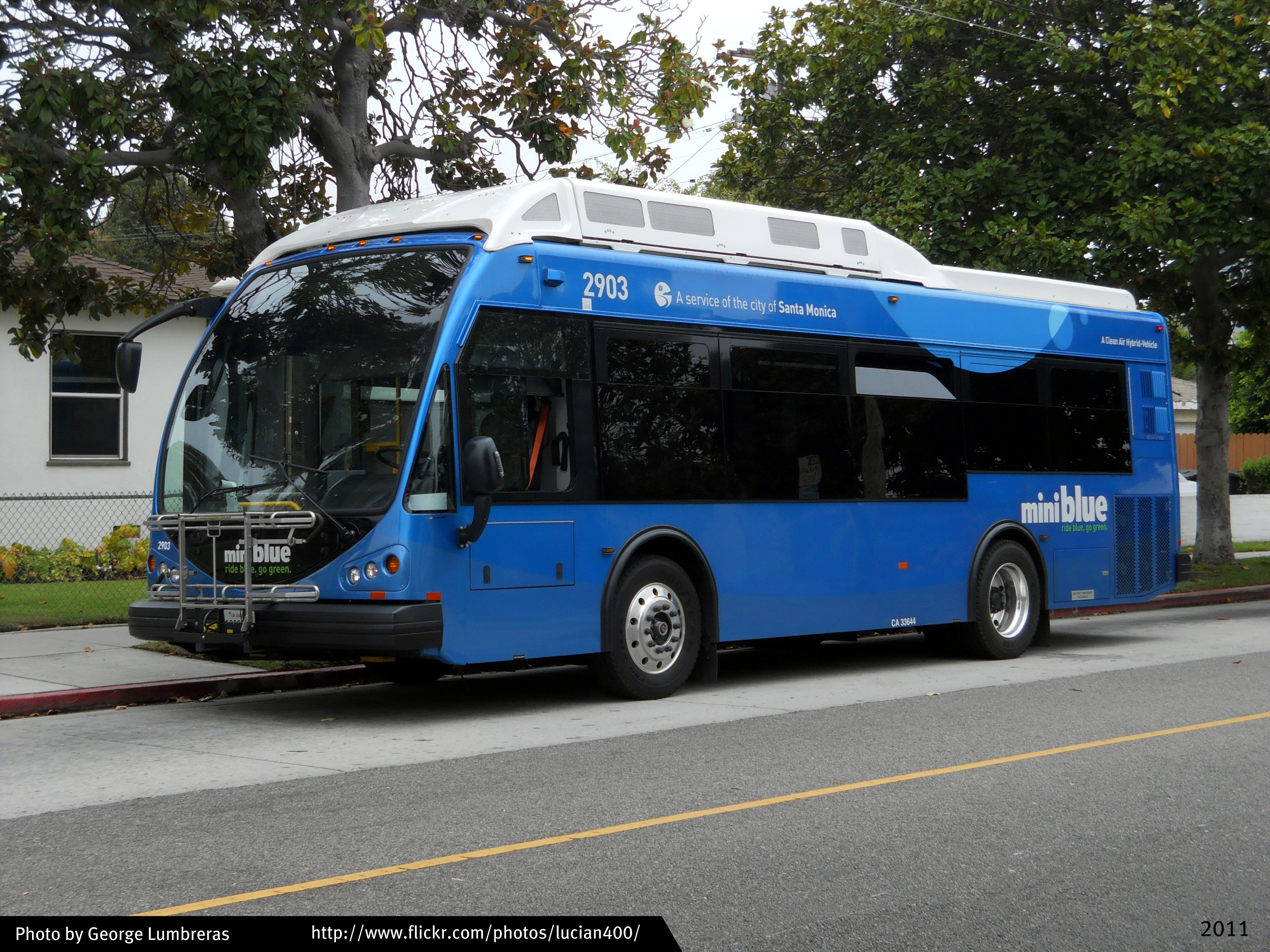
Big Blue Bus #2903, E-Z Rider II BRT with ISE gasoline-electric hybrid drivetrain

In the late 1990s, LADOT contracted with ISE Corporation to build eight prototype ThunderVolt series hybrid buses by installing an electric traction motor driven by an auxiliary power unit (APU) and storage battery into E-Z Rider buses. Four of these buses were to be equipped with propane-fueled 30 kW Capstone Turbine APUs and four would use propane-fueled internal combustion engine APUs built by GM. Regardless of the APU type, the electric drivetrain remained the same, a Siemens traction motor and lead-acid battery.

The E-Z Rider II also was sold with the ISE ThunderVolt hybrid-electric propulsion, including at least four buses (to Big Blue Bus serving Santa Monica, California) with gasoline-fueled APUs and similar electric traction equipment. Big Blue Bus had originally planned to acquire ten hybrid buses. Over time, the ISE ThunderVolt systems proved to be unreliable and many buses equipped with the system were either retired or repowered.

In more recent years, ENC has started offering the Allison Transmission H 40 dual-mode hybrid system, which has been proven much more reliable in applications with transit agencies across the nation. The H 40 hybrid system is coupled to the engine in lieu of a conventional transmission and offers continuously variable gear ratios with integrated assistance from a 600 V(AC) electric traction motor that is capable of driving the bus on electricity alone if needed; separate regenerative braking, power conversion, and energy storage modules are included. In 2021, the San Francisco Municipal Railway ordered 30 E-Z Rider II BRT coaches equipped with the H 40 hybrid system.

=== Fuel cell ===
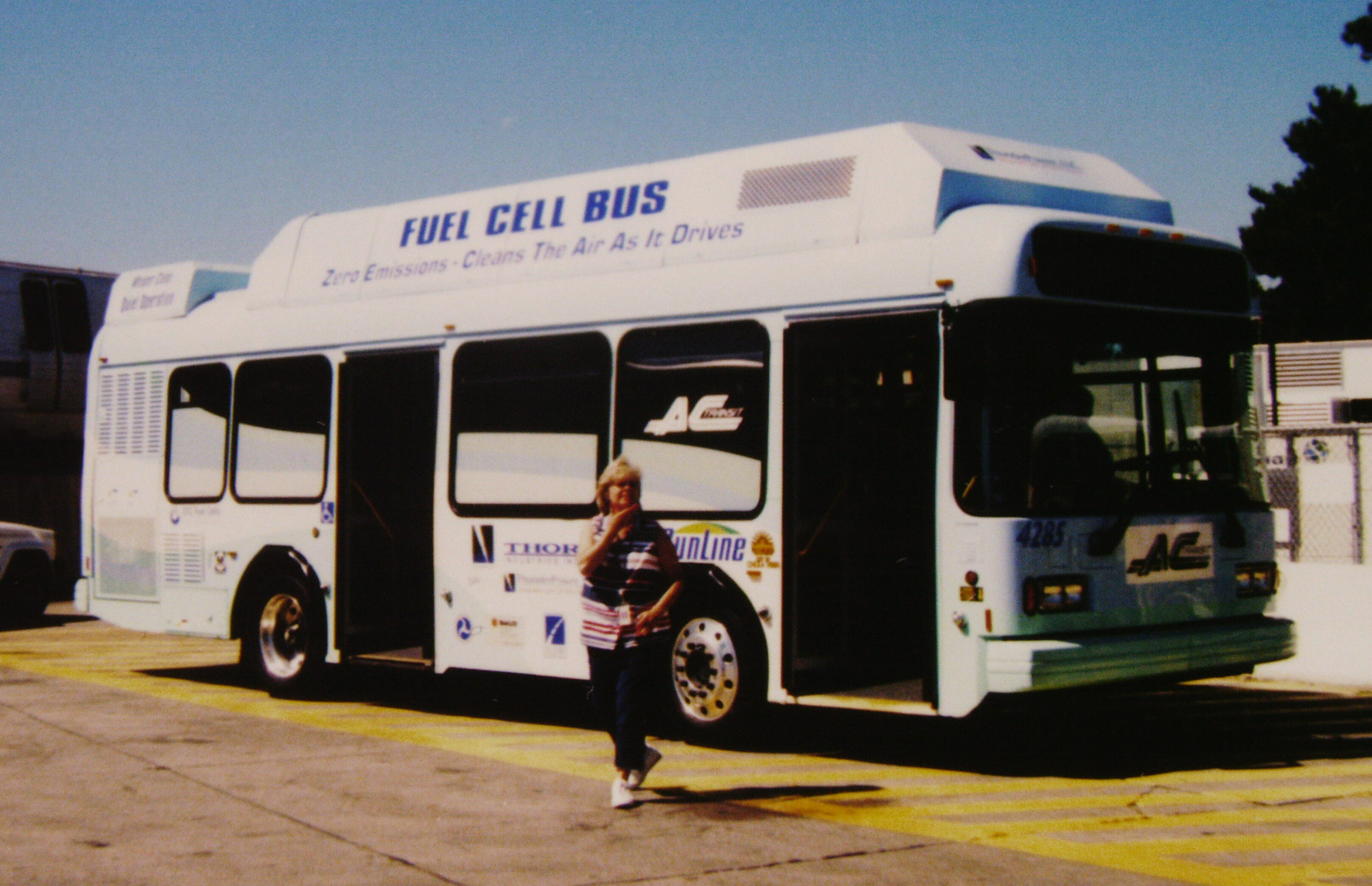
ThunderPower bus under evaluation at AC Transit with fleet #4285

ThunderPower, LLC, a joint venture of Thor Industries (the parent of ElDorado National at the time) and ISE Corporation (a hybrid drivetrain integrator), designed and built the ThunderPower TB30-FCH fuel cell prototype bus. The TB30-FCH was built on a 30' E-Z Rider II chassis, and equipped with a UTC Power hydrogen fuel cell and the ISE ThunderVolt series hybrid powertrain. The ThunderPower prototype was tested by SunLine Transit Agency in 2002, including three months of revenue service. It was subsequently tested at Chula Vista Transit and AC Transit. With a curb weight of 25,180 lb (11,420 kg), the prototype had a range of 250 mi (400 km).

After the test, the larger ENC Axess was selected as the chassis for further development and commercialization of fuel cell buses as part of the American Fuel Cell Bus (AFCB) program.

== Competition ==
- Gillig Low Floor – Low-floor bus offered in mid-sized lengths
- NABI LFW – Discontinued (1997–2015) low-floor bus offered in mid-sized lengths
- Neoplan Transliner – Discontinued (1981–2006) high-floor and low-floor bus offered in mid-sized lengths
- New Flyer Low Floor – Discontinued (1991–2014) low-floor bus offered in mid-sized lengths
- New Flyer Xcelsior – Low-floor bus offered in mid-sized lengths
- Orion VII – Discontinued (2001–2013) low-floor bus offered in mid-sized lengths
