= Goshen Coach =

Bus manufacturer in Elkhart, Indiana, US

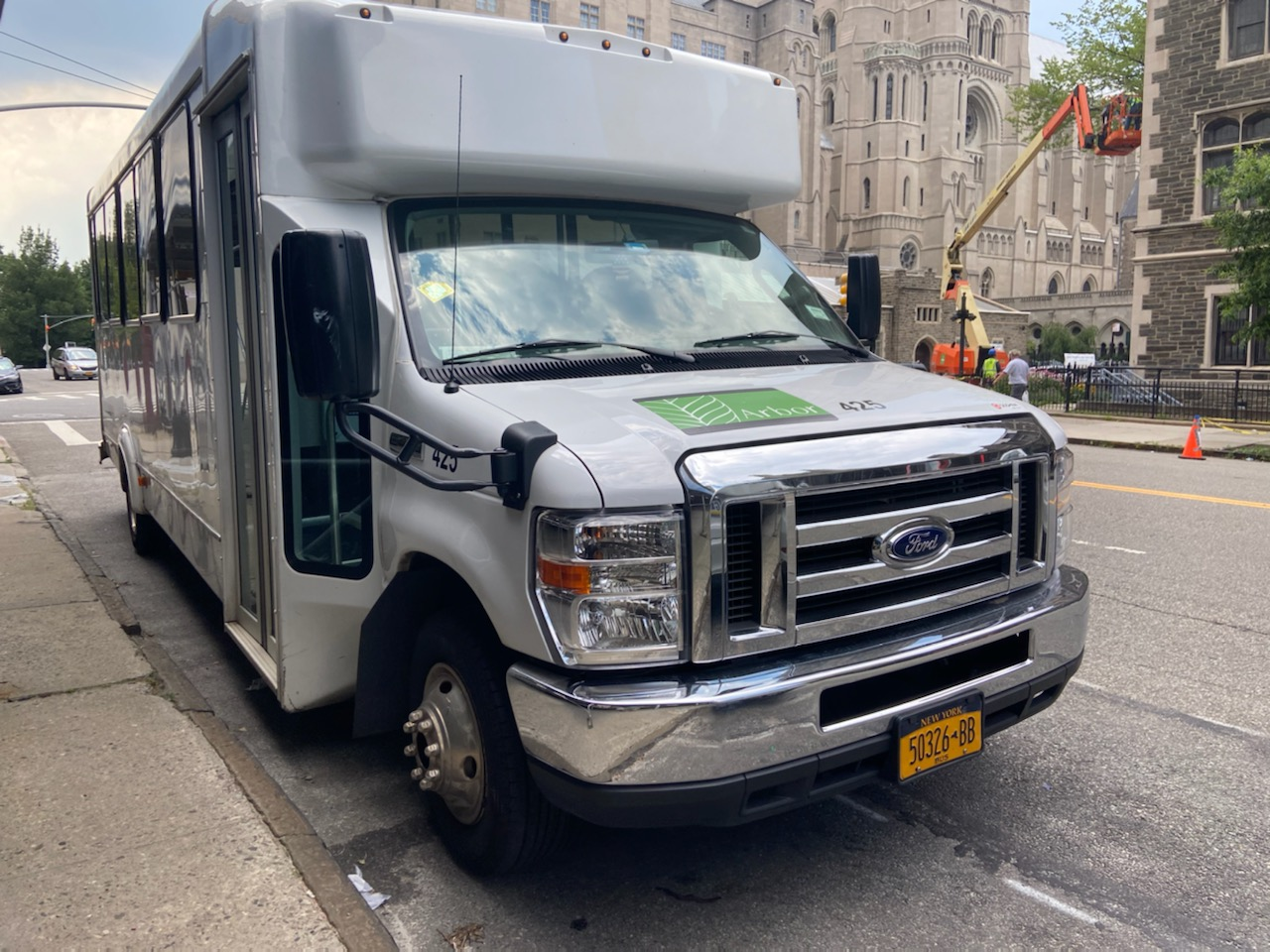
- 2019 Ford E-450 with a Goshen Coach Impulse body operating for Columbia Transportation
- Industry: Automotive
- Founded: 1985
- Defunct: 2016 (original company)
- Fate: Dissolved by REV Group in 2016, brand name sold to Forest River in 2020
- Headquarters: Salina, Kansas, United States
- Products: Cutaway buses
- Website: goshencoach.com (redirects to Eldorado Bus website)

Goshen Coach was an American cutaway bus builder located in Salina, Kansas.

The company was founded in 1985 and was owned by Thor Industries from 2005 until August 2013, when Thor sold the company to Allied Specialty Vehicles (later renamed REV Group). REV Group closed the Goshen Coach factory on October 31, 2016.

After the closure, REV continued to use the Goshen Coach name for some buses built at the ElDorado facility in Salina, Kansas and the Champion Bus facility in Imlay City, Michigan.

In May 2020, REV sold its cutaway bus businesses to Forest River, including the Goshen Coach brand name.

== Models ==
- Pacer II - Small, narrow-body, cutaway bus. Non-CDL, up to 15 passengers. Available on Ford E-350 chassis.
- Impulse - Small to mid-size, wide-body, cutaway bus. Up to 28 passengers. Available on Ford E-Series or Chevrolet Express chassis.
- G-Force - Large, cutaway bus. Up to 33 passengers. Available on Ford F-Series Super Duty chassis.
