= Champion Bus Incorporated =

American bus manufacturer

Champion Bus
- Type: Subsidiary
- Industry: automobile manufacturing
- Products: buses
- Parent: Forest River
- Website: championbus.com

Champion Bus is a bus manufacturer owned by Forest River of Elkhart, Indiana, United States. It was formerly owned by Thor Industries of Imlay City, Michigan, United States. ASV purchased it from Thor in August 2013. Champion acquired the Federal Coach bus marque from Forest River in 2013.

Other brand names under ASV include ElDorado National, Collins Bus and Goshen Coach. Allied Specialty Vehicles changed its name to REV Group in November 2015.

In May 2020, REV Group sold its shuttle bus business to Forest River.

== Models ==
Buses made under the Champion name include:

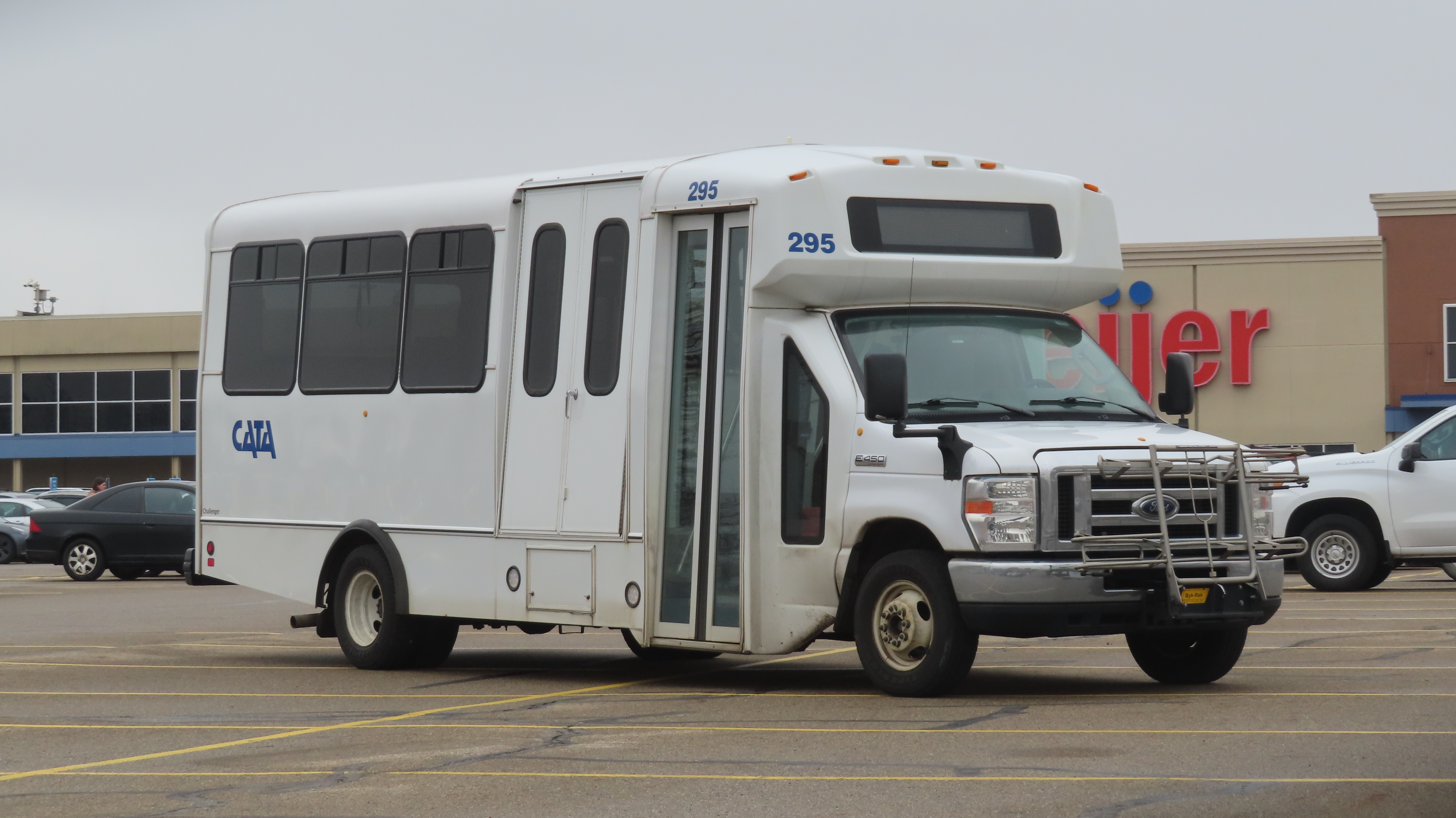
Champion Challenger minibus

- Challenger - small to mid-size bus using a Ford E-series (350 or 450), Chevy Express 3500 or 4500 chassis
- Crusader - small bus using Ford E-series (350) and Chevy Express 3500 Chassis
- CTS FE (Front Engine) - large bus using Freightliner MB65 Chassis
- CTS RE (Rear Engine) - large bus using Freightliner MB55 and MB75 Chassis
- Defender - large bus using Ford F-550, International 3200 Series, and Freightliner M2 Chassis
- LF Transport - Mid-size low-floor bus using the Ford E-450 and F-550, GM4500 and the Freightliner M2 Chassis. This particular unit can feature FLEXBUS technology.
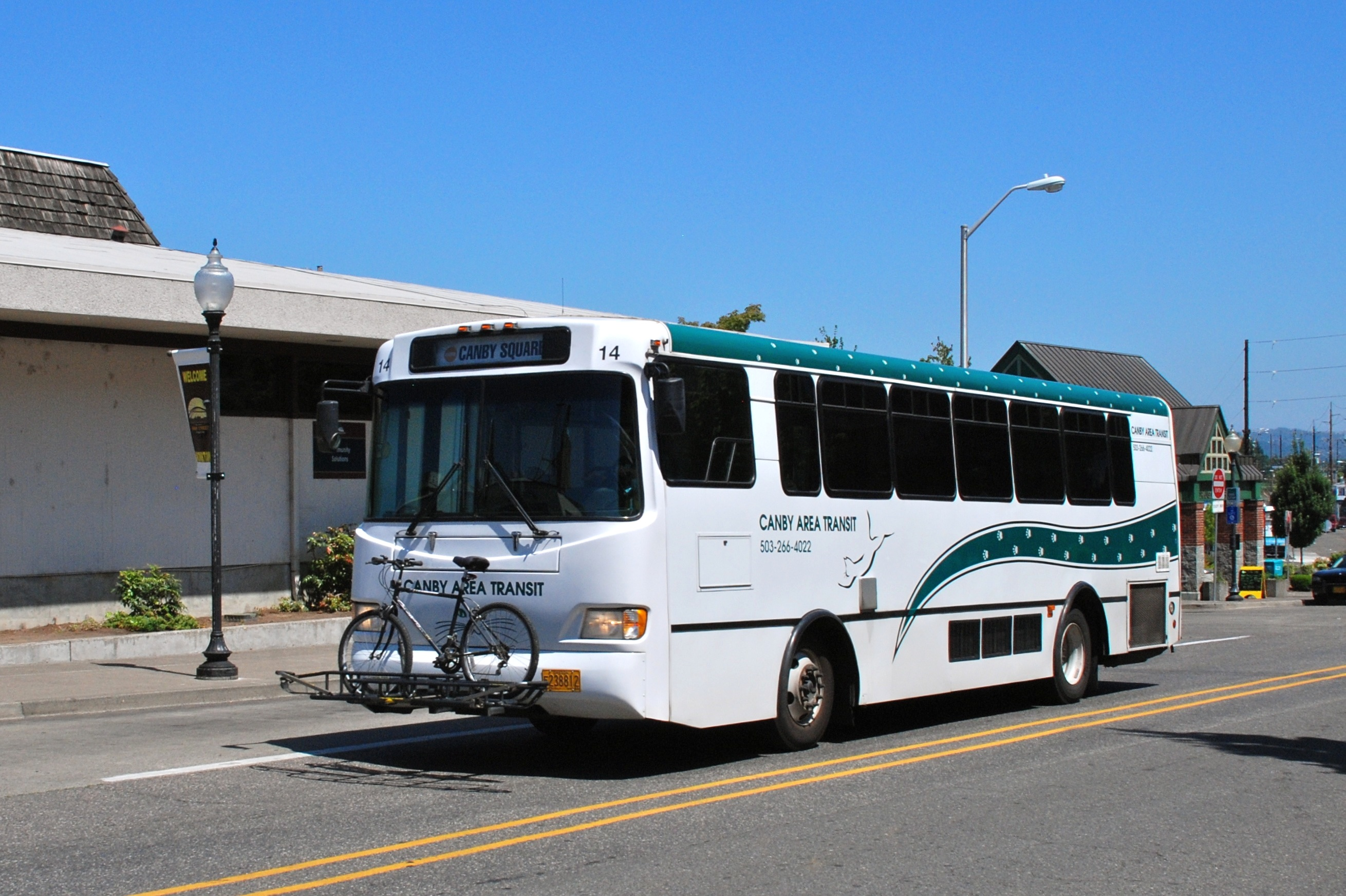
  A Champion CTS Rear Engine bus
