= ENC (company) =

American transit bus manufacturer

- Formerly: ElDorado National–California; National Coach Corporation
- Type: Subsidiary
- Industry: Automotive
- Founded: 1975
- Headquarters: Riverside, California, United States
- Products: Transit buses
- Parent: Thor Industries (1991–2013); REV Group (2013–2024); Rivaz, Inc. (2024–present)
- Website: eldorado-ca.com

ENC, formerly El Dorado National–California, is an American manufacturer of heavy-duty transit buses with its headquarters and main factory in Riverside, California. It is owned by Rivaz Inc.

The company was founded in 1975 as National Coach Corporation and combined with ElDorado Motors, a Kansas-based builder of cutaway buses in 1991 to become El Dorado National–California and El Dorado National–Kansas. The combined El Dorado National became one of the leading suppliers of light-duty and mid-size buses for the airport/hotel/rental car shuttle bus markets and local transit operators with smaller fleets. In the early 2000s, the California plant further diversified into the heavy-duty transit market, introducing the mid-size E-Z Rider and full-size Axess bus, which are marketed to major municipal fleet operators.

In 2020, the Kansas based cutaway bus manufacturing business was spun off as ElDorado and sold to Forest River. Plans to shut down ENC were originally announced in early 2024 but REV Group, which owned the company, sold the business to Rivaz instead.

== History ==
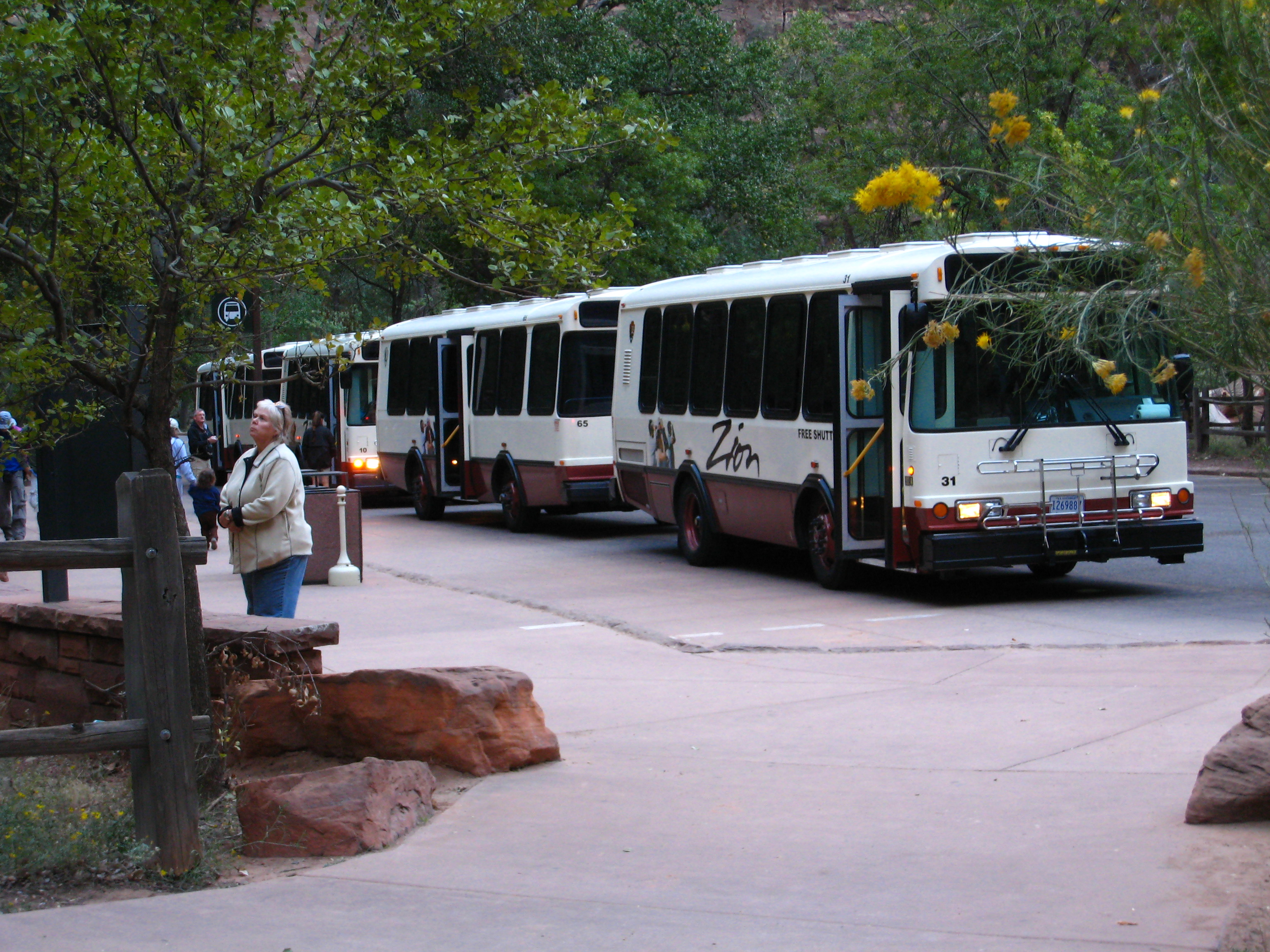
El Dorado National Transmark (now called the XHF) in Zion National Park

ENC started as National Coach, which built recreational vehicles and mid-size buses in California.

National Coach was founded in 1975 by William Feldman and Thomas Hollenbeck in Gardena, California, later expanding with a second factory in Chino in 1984, and a third facility in Carson. The company was best known for developing the Escort, a shuttle bus used by airport car rental agencies and hotels, and the Landmark line of cutaway buses.

In 1991, National was purchased by Thor Industries, a recreational vehicle and bus manufacturer. Thor combined National with its other bus building business, the ElDorado Motor Corporation based in Kansas. National would begin operating as ElDorado National–California (ENC), while ElDorado would become ElDorado National–Kansas. While the Kansas group would concentrate on cutaway buses, the California operation would largely focus on building medium-duty shuttle buses for universities, airport hotels, small transit fleets, and car rental services.

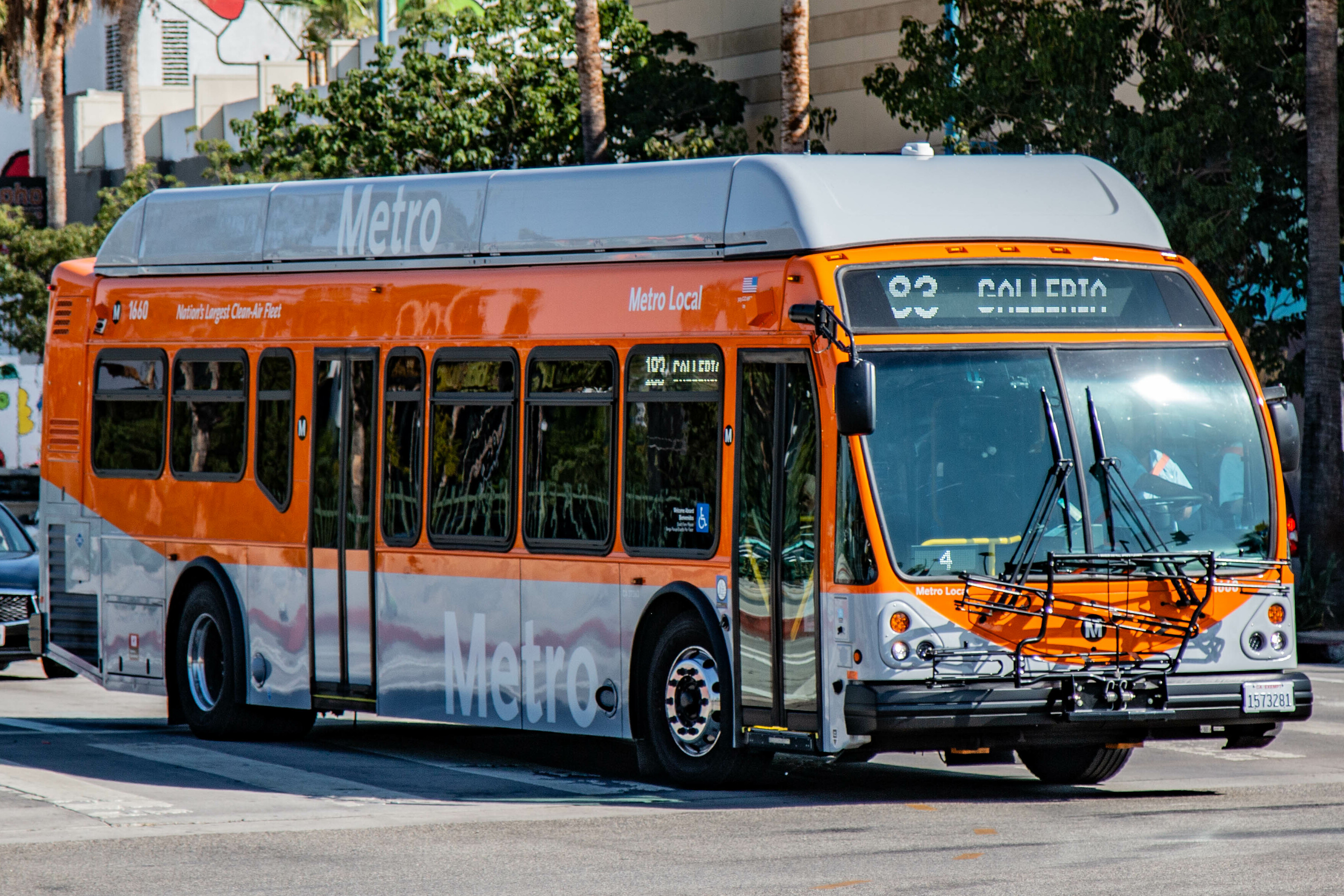
ENC Axess bus operated by Los Angeles Metro

In the early 2000s, ElDorado National–California expanded into the heavy-duty bus business with the mid-size E-Z Rider and full-size Axess buses. Heavy-duty buses are typically purchased by government-funded public transport services and are required to pass independent, rigorous 12-year/500,000-mile longevity testing at the Pennsylvania Transportation Institute in Altoona to qualify for federal subsidies. To enable the new production and bring all of its workers under one roof, ENC broke ground in June 2003 on a new manufacturing site in Riverside, California, more than doubling factory floor space to 200,000 ft^{2} (19,000 m^{2}). The facility, which opened in December 2003, was equipped with an exterior water testing system, a CNG fueling station, and a test track to check product quality.

Thor sold ElDorado National to Allied Specialty Vehicles (ASV) when it divested its bus business in August 2013. Other brands included in the sale were Champion Bus, General Coach America, and Goshen Coach. Allied Specialty Vehicles changed its name to REV Group in November 2015. In March 2016, both ElDorado National–California and ElDorado National–Kansas unveiled new logos to distinguish their operations; the Kansas-based manufacturer was rebranded to ElDorado, while the California-based transit bus manufacturer was rebranded to its initials, ENC.

In May 2020, REV Group sold its cutaway bus businesses (including ElDorado National–Kansas) to Forest River, but retained the heavy-duty transit and school bus businesses and brands, including ENC and Collins Industries.

In January 2024, REV Group announced that it planned to wind down operations at ENC, cited difficulty with suppliers and an extremely competitive market for transit buses as its reason for exiting the business. ENC was originally slated to cease operations in October, but on October 18, 2024, it was announced that Rivaz Inc. completed its acquisition of ENC from REV Group for $52 million.

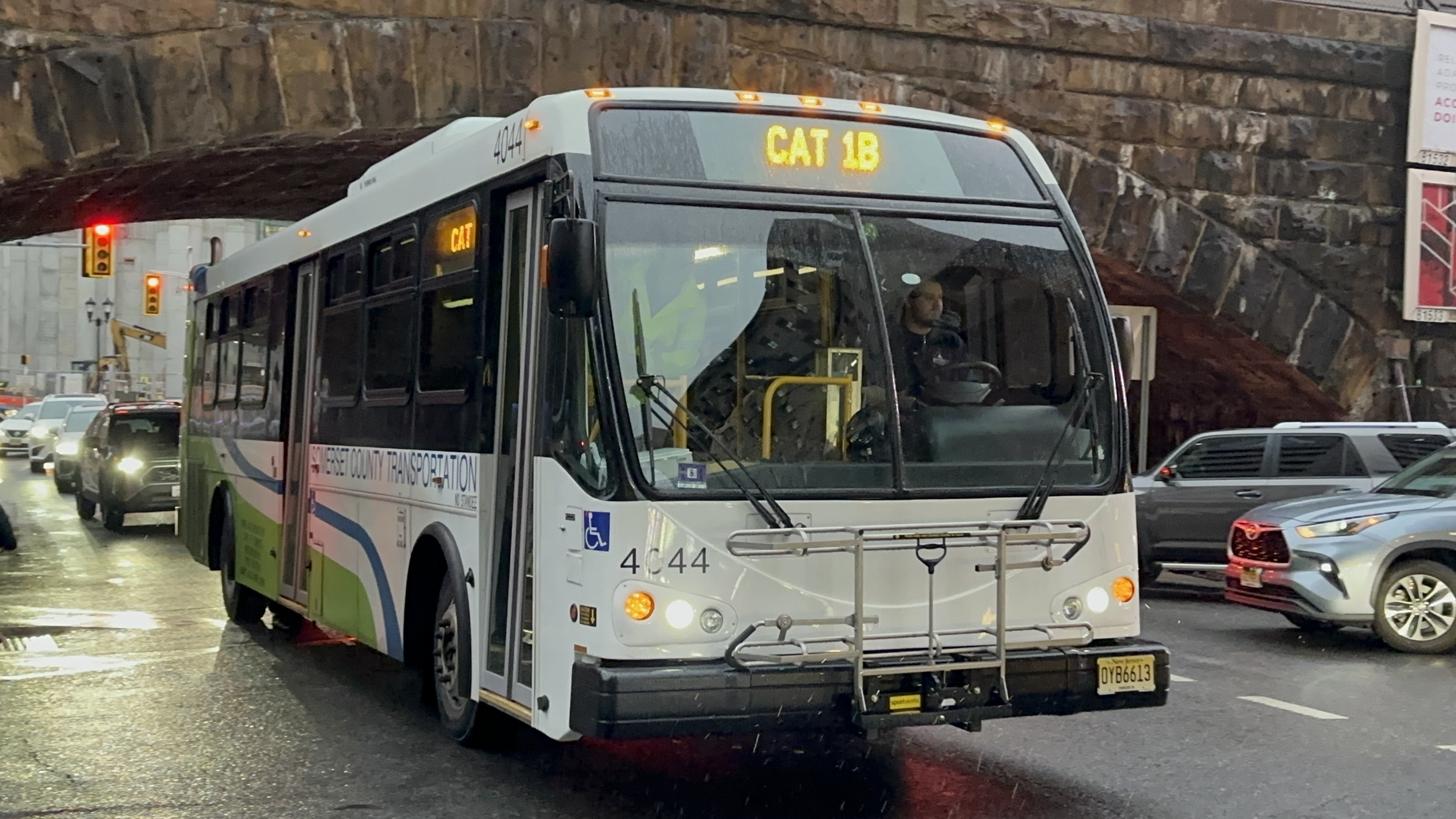
Somerset County Transportation ENC Arrivo 4044 leaving the New Brunswick NJ train station in December 2025

== Models ==
Model	Image	Notes	Refs.
Axess		Low floor heavy-duty full-sized bus	
E-Z Rider II		Low floor heavy-duty mid-sized bus	
XHF		High-floor medium-duty mid-sized narrow shuttle bus, available with matching trailers to form a two or three-unit tram	
Passport-HD		Low-floor medium-duty cutaway bus	
