= Forest River (company) =

American manufacturer of recreational vehicles and trailers

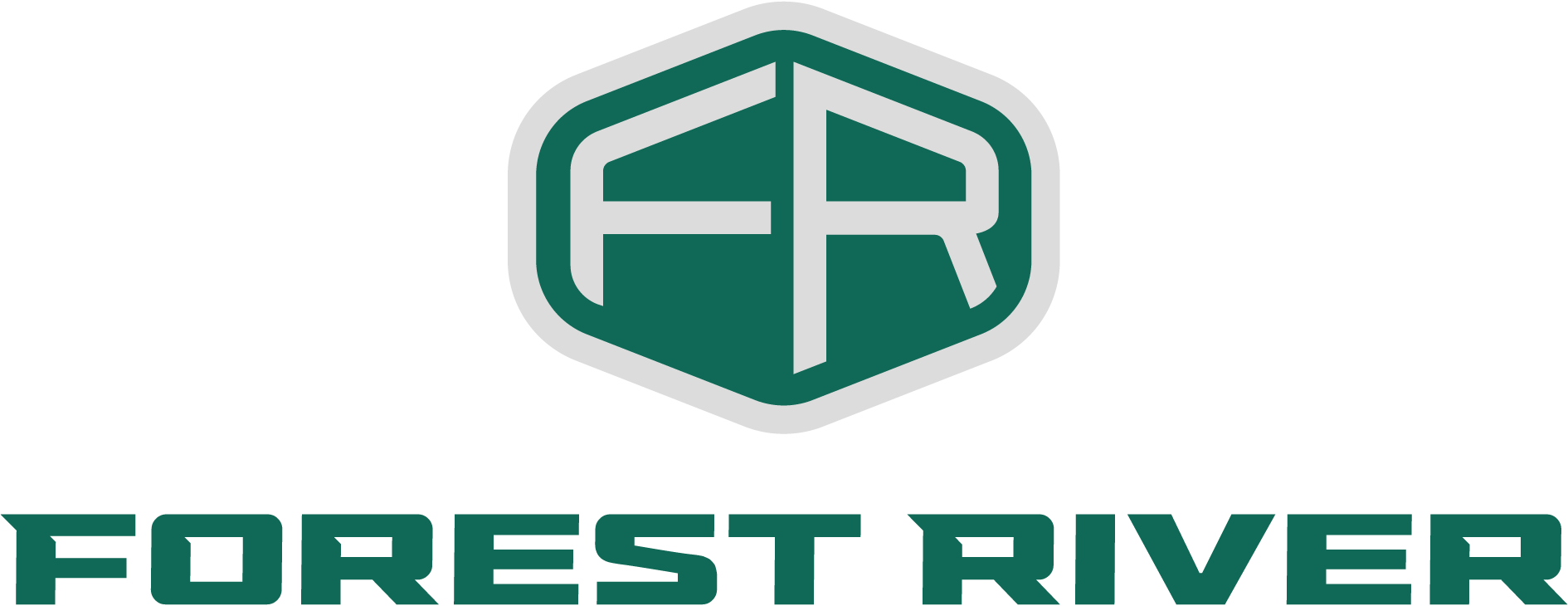
- Type: Subsidiary
- Industry: Recreational vehicle products
- Founded: January 26, 1996; 30 years ago
- Founder: Peter Liegl
- Headquarters: Elkhart, Indiana, United States
- Number of locations: More than 100 Plants
- Key people: Doug Gaeddert (CEO)
- Number of employees: 11,000
- Parent: Berkshire Hathaway (2005-present)
- Divisions: List of Divisions: Prime Time Manufacturing; Coachmen RV; Shasta RV; Palomino RV; Forest River RV; Dynamax Corporation; Glaval Bus; Elkhart Coach; Starcraft Bus; AmeraLite; Cargo Mate; Continental Cargo; Haulin Trailers; Lightning Trailers; Rance Aluminum Trailers; US Cargo; Berkshire Pontoon; South Bay Pontoon; Trifecta Pontoon; Qualridge; Rockport Commercial Vehicles; Berkshire Coach; East to West; Battisti Customs
- Website: www.forestriverinc.com

Forest River Inc. is an American manufacturer of recreational vehicles, cargo trailers, utility trailers, pontoon boats, and buses.

== History ==
Forest River, Inc. was founded in 1996 by Peter Liegl after purchasing certain assets of Cobra Industries, where CEO Peter Liegl worked from 1985 to 1993. The company started by manufacturing tent campers, travel trailers, fifth wheels, and park models under the model lines Salem, Sierra, Sandpiper, Wildwood, Rockwood, Flagstaff, Summit, and Quailridge. Later that same year, they began producing cargo utility trailers as Cargo Mate.

In 1998, Forest River Launched Forest River Marine and began producing pontoon boats. That same year the company purchased certain assets of Firan Motorhomes to begin manufacturing class A motorhomes.

In 2001, Forest River acquired Starcraft Bus and Glaval Bus.

In 2005, Forest River, Inc., was acquired by Berkshire Hathaway. In the same year Elkhart Coach was launched. As the Wall Street Columnist Ben Cohen noted:

"Liegl came to him (Warren Buffett) with a price in mind: $800 million. So he did some basic diligence. The next day, Buffett made an offer. The next week, Liegl came to Omaha. They met for 20 minutes and shook hands on a deal."

Forest River continued to expand with the acquisition of Rance Aluminum Fabrication and Priority One Financial Services in 2007.

The following year, the company acquired assets of Coachmen RV, a subsidiary of Coachmen Industries and a manufacturer of class A motorhomes, class C motorhomes, travel trailers, fifth wheels, tent campers and sport utility trailers.

In 2011, Forest River acquired Dynamax Corporation, which builds motorhomes (class C and super class C).

In 2014, the company expanded with production facilities in Silverton, Oregon, Hemet, California, and White Pigeon, Michigan. That same year, the company acquired StarTrans Bus.

In January 2017, Forest River launched its new line of luxury buses, Berkshire Coach. In June of the same year, Battisti Customs was acquired.

In May 2020, Forest River acquired the REV Group shuttle bus brands Champion, Federal Coach, World Trans, Krystal Coach, ElDorado, and Goshen Coach. In 2020, they closed the Federal Coach, Goshen Coach, Krystal Coach, and World Trans brands soon after acquisition.

In 2022–2024, they shut down Battisti Customs, Berkshire Coach brands.

In January 2024, Forest River acquired the school bus manufacturer Collins Bus from REV Group. Later, the company acquired another school bus manufacturer Trans Tech.

Forest River Bus & Van acquired L.A. West Coaches in January 2025.

In March 2025, co-CEO David Wright announced his retirement from Forest River, Inc., citing the recent passing of his longtime friend, mentor and Forest River founder, Pete Liegl.

== Subsidiaries ==
Forest River, Inc., though known best for its recreational vehicles, sells a wide variety of products including cargo trailers, buses, and pontoon boats. Below are the subsidiary brands of Forest River, Inc.:

=== Buses ===
- Glaval Bus
- Starcraft Bus
- StarTrans Bus
- ElDorado Motor Corp.
- Champion Bus
- Collins Bus
- Trans Tech

=== Vans ===
- Forest River Vans
- Mobility Trans
- L.A. West Coaches

=== Cargo Trailers ===
- Force Trailers
- Restroom Trailers
- AmeraLite
- Cargo Mate
- Cargo King
- Continental Cargo
- Haulin Trailers
- Lightning Trailers
- Rance Aluminum Trailers
- US Cargo

=== Commercial Trucks ===
- Rockport Commercial Vehicles

=== Park Models ===
- Cabins and Suites
- Summit
- Quailridge

=== Pontoon Boats ===
- Berkshire Pontoons
- South Bay Pontoons
- Trifecta Pontoons
