= Thor Industries =

American recreational vehicle manufacturer

Thor Industries, Inc.

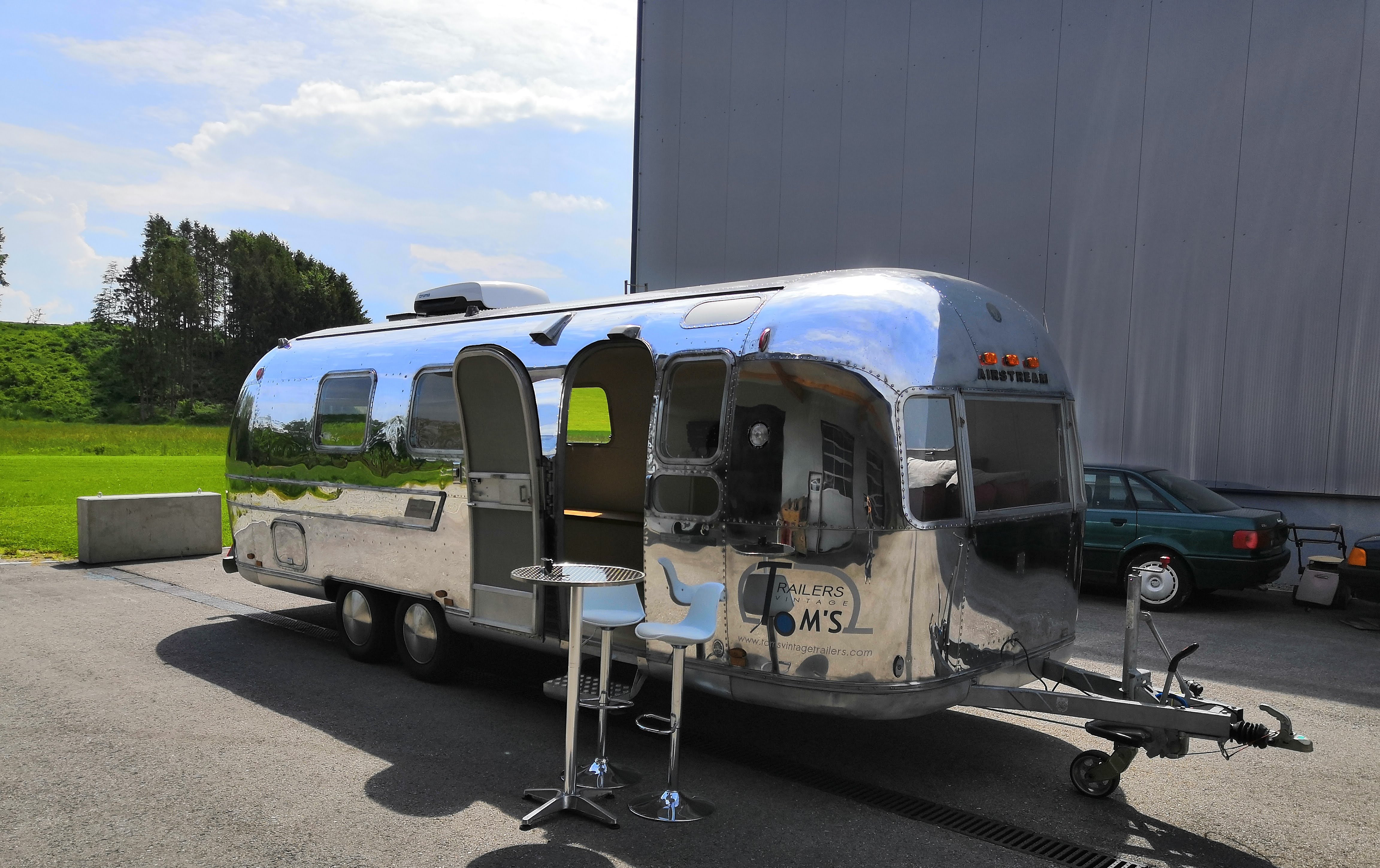
- Company type: Public
- Traded as: NYSE: THO; S&P 400 Component
- Industry: Recreational vehicle (RV)
- Founded: 1983 (through acquisition of Airstream)
- Founders: Wade Thompson; Peter Busch Orthwein
- Headquarters: Elkhart, Indiana, United States
- Key people: Peter Busch Orthwein(Chairman); Bob Martin(CEO)
- Revenue: ▼$11.121 billion USD (2023)
- Operating income: ▼$499.3 million USD (2023)
- Net income: ▼$374.2 million USD (2023)
- Total assets: ▼$7.260 billion USD (2023)
- Total equity: ▲$3.983 billion USD (2023)
- Number of employees: 24,900 (2023)
- Subsidiaries: See subsidiaries below (52)
- Website: www.thorindustries.com

Thor Industries, Inc. is an American manufacturer of recreational vehicles (RVs). The company sells towable and motorized RVs through its subsidiaries brands including Airstream, Heartland RV, Jayco, and others. The company's headquarters is in Elkhart, Indiana. It has manufacturing facilities in Michigan, Ohio, Indiana, Idaho and Oregon.

== History ==
=== 1980–1987: Foundation, acquisition of Airstream, going public ===
Thor Industries, Inc. was founded on August 29, 1980, when Wade Thompson and Peter Busch Orthwein acquired Airstream from Beatrice Foods. The name "Thor" combined the first two letters of each entrepreneur's name. Airstream had not fared well during the economic downturn of the late 1970s, losing $12 million the year before it was acquired. Thompson and Orthwein had also previously acquired the Hi-Lo Trailer Company.

In 1982, Thor acquired the Canada-based General Coach, a manufacturer of travel trailers and motorhomes. The company went public in 1984 and joined the New York Stock Exchange under the stock ticker symbol "THO" in 1986. Thor purchased The Establishment “McPheters Machine Products” which was a manufacturer of Both Class A and C motorhomes. In 1986, it was listed among Forbes' "200 best small companies in America".

=== 1988–2004: Expansion into bus market, further RV acquisitions ===
In 1988, Thor acquired the small bus manufacturing division of the Kansas-based ElDorado Motor Corp. It would later acquire the California-based bus manufacturer, National Coach, in 1991. Thor merged the two bus divisions to create ElDorado National.

Thor also continued acquiring RV and travel trailer makers, including Indiana-based Dutchmen in 1991 and Four Winds International (also based in Indiana) in 1992. By 1994, Thor Industries was the second-largest manufacturer of RVs in North America. In 1995, Thor acquired two RV makers: Skamper (an Indiana-based manufacturer of folding travel trailers) and Komfort (an Oregon-based travel trailer company). In 1996, the company established Thor California, an RV manufacturer based in its namesake state with models like the Tahoe and Wanderer.

Thor added to its roster of bus manufacturers by acquiring the Michigan-based Champion Bus for $11 million in 1998. The company finalized a $145-million deal in 2001 to acquire Keystone RV, an Elkhart, Indiana-based manufacturer of travel trailers and fifth wheels. The deal was one of the largest in the history of the company and gave Thor a 25% market share in travel trailers and fifth wheels. In 2003, it added Damon Motor Coach of Elkhart, Indiana which it purchased for $46 million in cash. Damon's park trailer subsidiary brand, Breckenridge, was also included in the deal. The following year, Thor acquired Topeka, Indiana-based CrossRoads RV for $27 million.

=== 2005–2012: Acquisition of more RV brands, sale of bus division ===
In May 2005, Thor acquired Goshen Coach, a bus manufacturer from Indiana that had filed for Chapter 11 bankruptcy earlier in the month. In November 2009, Wade Thompson stepped down as the company's CEO and was replaced by Peter Busch Orthwein. Orthwein had served as the company's treasurer and director since founding it. Soon after the announcement, Thompson died due to complications of colon cancer.

In March 2010, Thor acquired SJC Industries, an Elkhart-based manufacturer of ambulances, for $20 million. SJC's brands of McCoy Miller, Marque, and Premiere were also included in the sale. In April of that year, the company sold its Canadian General Coach subsidiary to management. Later in 2010, Thor acquired Heartland RV, another Elkhart-based maker of fifth wheels and lightweight RVs. The company also consolidated Damon Motor Coach and Four Winds International to create Thor Motor Coach that year.

In late 2012, Thor purchased two bus companies: California based Krystal Infinity and Ohio based luxury bus maker, Federal Coach. Krystal was acquired through Thor's ElDorado National subsidiary and operations were moved to the Salina, Kansas facility. Federal was acquired through Thor's Champion subsidiary and operations were moved to the Imlay City, Michigan facility. In the spring of 2013, Thor moved its headquarters from Jackson Center, Ohio to Elkhart, Indiana. In May 2013, Thor sold its ambulance subsidiary, SJC Industries, to Wheeled Coach Industries. Later that year, Thor would sell its entire fleet of bus brands (Champion, ElDorado National, Federal Coach, Krystal Infinity, Goshen Coach, and General Coach America) to Allied Specialty Vehicles for $100 million.

=== 2013–present: Acquisitions of Jayco and Hymer ===
In June 2013, Thor purchased the production site in Wakarusa, Indiana that formerly housed the manufacturing operations of Navistar International. It later acquired the former Monaco Coach facility in Wakarusa and combined the two to create the Wakarusa Production Campus. In August 2013 then-COO Bob Martin took over as CEO of the company with Peter Orthwein moving to chairman. It also acquired the assets of Livin Lite RV's in 2013, as well as Bison Coach, a manufacturer of horse trailers that have RV-style living quarters.

Thor acquired K-Z Inc., a manufacturer of primarily travel trailers based in Shipshewana, Indiana, in 2014. In January 2015, Thor's Heartland subsidiary acquired the RV company, Cruiser RV, and the luxury fifth wheel manufacturer, DRV. In May of that year, Thor purchased Postle Aluminum, a provider of aluminum components that were already in frequent use by Thor and its subsidiaries.

In July 2016, Thor acquired Jayco for $576 million. Jayco, based in Middlebury, Indiana, had been the largest privately owned RV maker in the world prior to the sale. Jayco's subsidiares (including Starcraft RV, Highland Ridge, and Entegra Coach) also came under the Thor umbrella. In September 2018, it was announced that Thor had agreed to purchase Hymer, a German manufacturer of RVs, in a deal worth $2.45 billion in the largest acquisition in the company's history. Hymer is the largest RV manufacturer in Europe. As a result of the deal, Thor Industries became the largest RV manufacturer in the world. The sale was officially finalized in February 2019.

In December 2020, the company acquired the manufacturer of luxury recreational vehicles Tiffin Motorhomes for $300 Mln.

== Subsidiaries ==
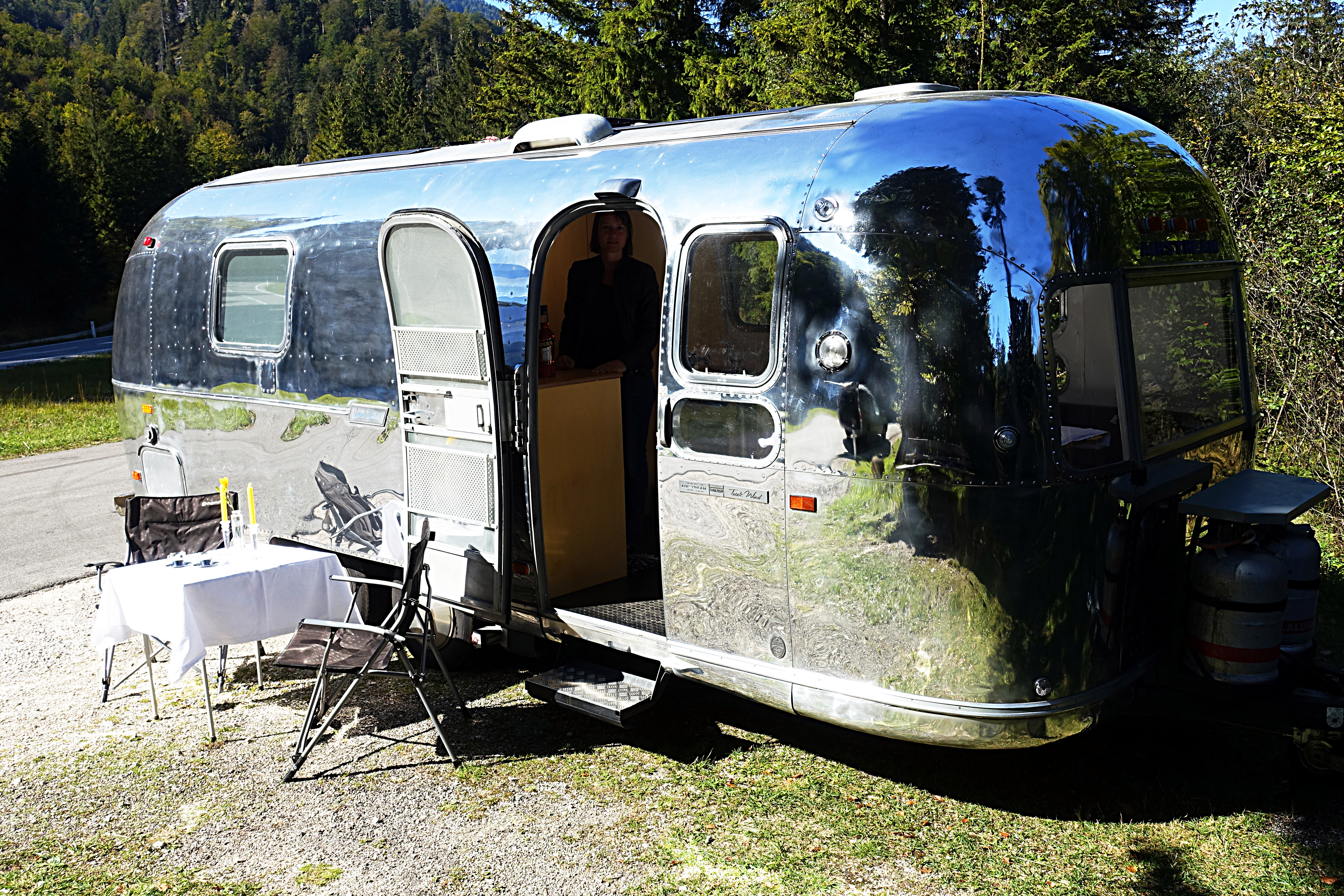
Photo of an Airstream trailer taken in 2018.

=== Airstream ===
Airstream is a manufacturer of travel trailers and motor homes, known for its distinctive all-aluminum models. It was founded by Wally Byam in the 1930s and has had manufacturing facilities in Jackson Center, Ohio since the 1950s. It was sold to Beatrice Foods in 1967. In 1980, it became the foundation of Thor Industries after it was acquired by Wade Thompson and Peter Busch Orthwein. Airstream sells numerous models including the Flying Cloud, Bambi, Classic, Nest, International Signature, and Basecamp.

=== Heartland RV ===
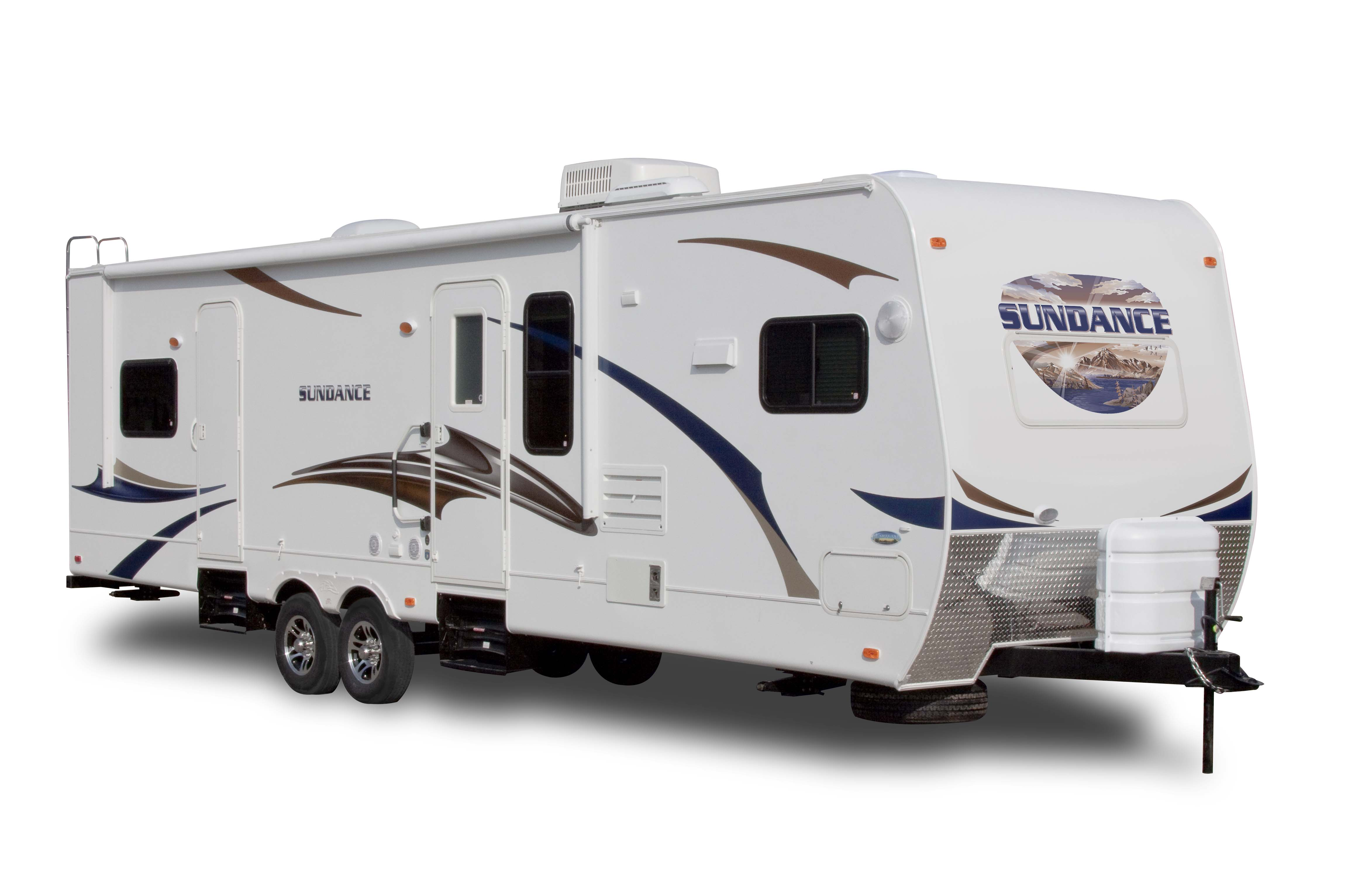
Sundance travel trailer manufactured by Heartland RV.

Heartland RV is an Elkhart, Indiana-based manufacturer of fifth wheels and travel trailers. It was founded in 2003 by Brian Brady and was acquired by Thor in 2010. Heartland produces a range of brands including the BigHorn line, Sundance and Cyclone models.

=== Hymer ===
Hymer is a German manufacturer of RVs based in Bad Waldsee. It was founded in 1923 by Erwin Hymer, but did not create its first caravan (travel trailer) until 1957. It was acquired by Thor in 2019 as Thor's first acquisition outside of the United States.

=== Dutchmen ===
Dutchmen is a manufacturer of RVs based in Goshen, Indiana. It was founded in 1988 by Dave Hoefer, Glen M. Sylvester, and Larry Schrock and became the second-largest manufacturer of travel trailers and fifth wheels in the United States by 1990. It was acquired by Thor Industries in 1991. Dutchmen manufactures brands like the Aerolite, Coleman, Denali, Kodiak, Aspen Trail, and others.

=== Jayco ===
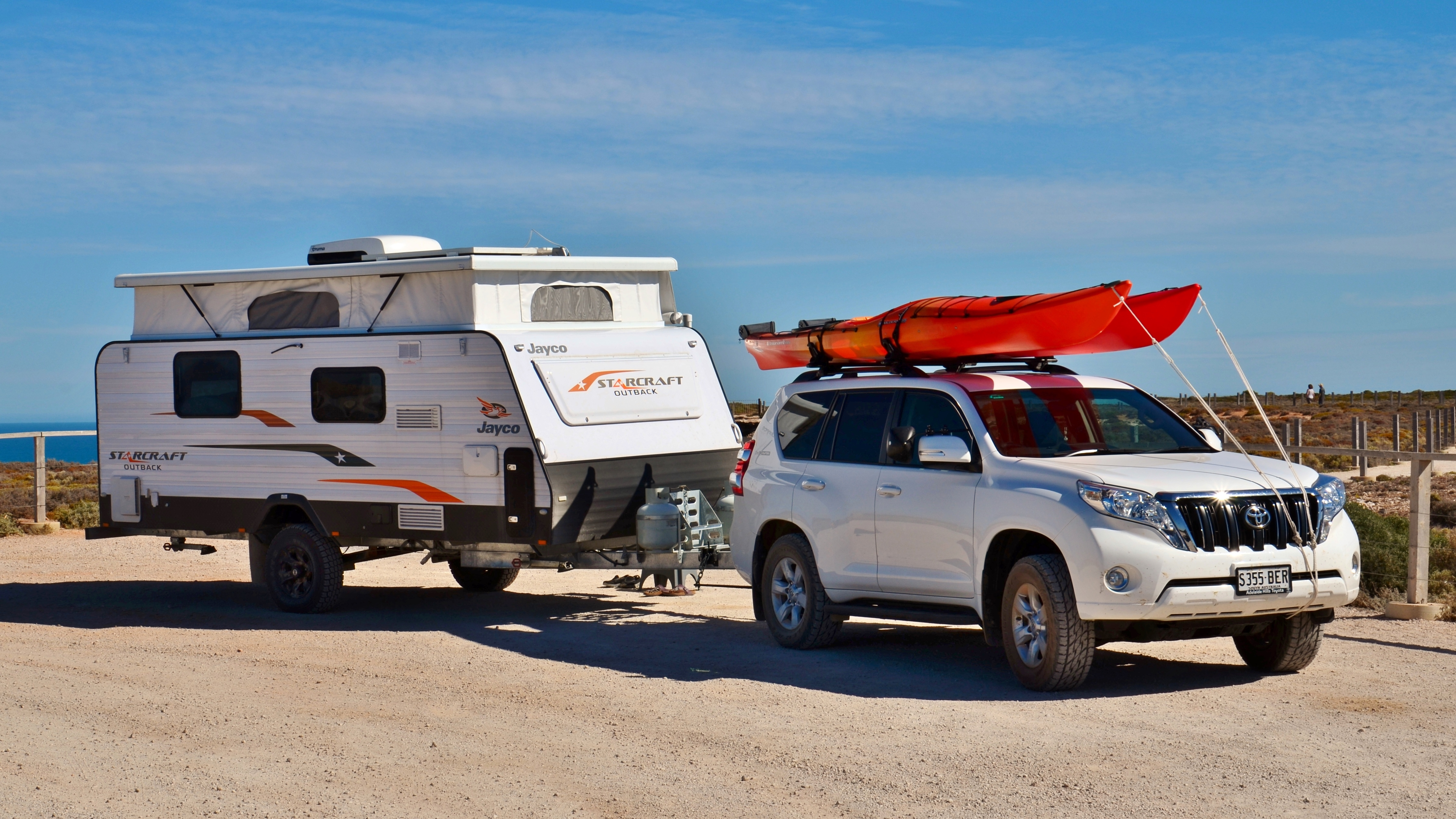
Starcraft fold-down camping trailer, manufactured by Jayco, being pulled by a Toyota Land Cruiser Prado in 2017.

Jayco is an RV maker based in Middlebury, Indiana. It was founded in 1968 by Lloyd and Bertha Bontrager and was acquired by Thor in 2016. It makes a variety of fold-down camping trailers, fifth wheels, motorhomes, toy haulers, and other travel trailers with brands like Starcraft RV, Highland Ridge and Entegra Coach.

=== Keystone RV ===
Keystone RV is a Goshen, Indiana-based RV manufacturer. It was founded in 1996 by Cole Davis and was listed at number 2 on the Inc. 500 list of the fastest growing companies in 2000. It was acquired by Thor in 2001 and manufactures luxury travel trailers and fifth wheel brands including Cougar, Montana, Laredo, Passport, and Sprinter.

=== Thor Motor Coach ===
Thor Motor Coach, a motor home manufacturer in Elkhart, Indiana, was created in 2010 through a consolidation of Four Winds International and Damon Motor Coach. Four Winds was first acquired by Thor in 1992 and Damon was acquired in 2003.

=== Other ===
Thor operates several other RV manufacturers, including K-Z, Crossroads RV, and the latter's subsidiary, Redwood RV.

The company also owns Postle Aluminum, a manufacturer of aluminum components, and AirXcel, a supplier of RV Parts and accessories.
