= Livin Lite RV =

American manufacturer of recreation vehicles

- Company type: Subsidiary
- Industry: recreation vehicles
- Founded: 2003
- Headquarters: Shipshewana, Indiana, USA
- Key people: Scott Tuttle, Aram Koltookian, Dave Boggs
- Owner: Thor Industries
- Website: www.livinlite.com

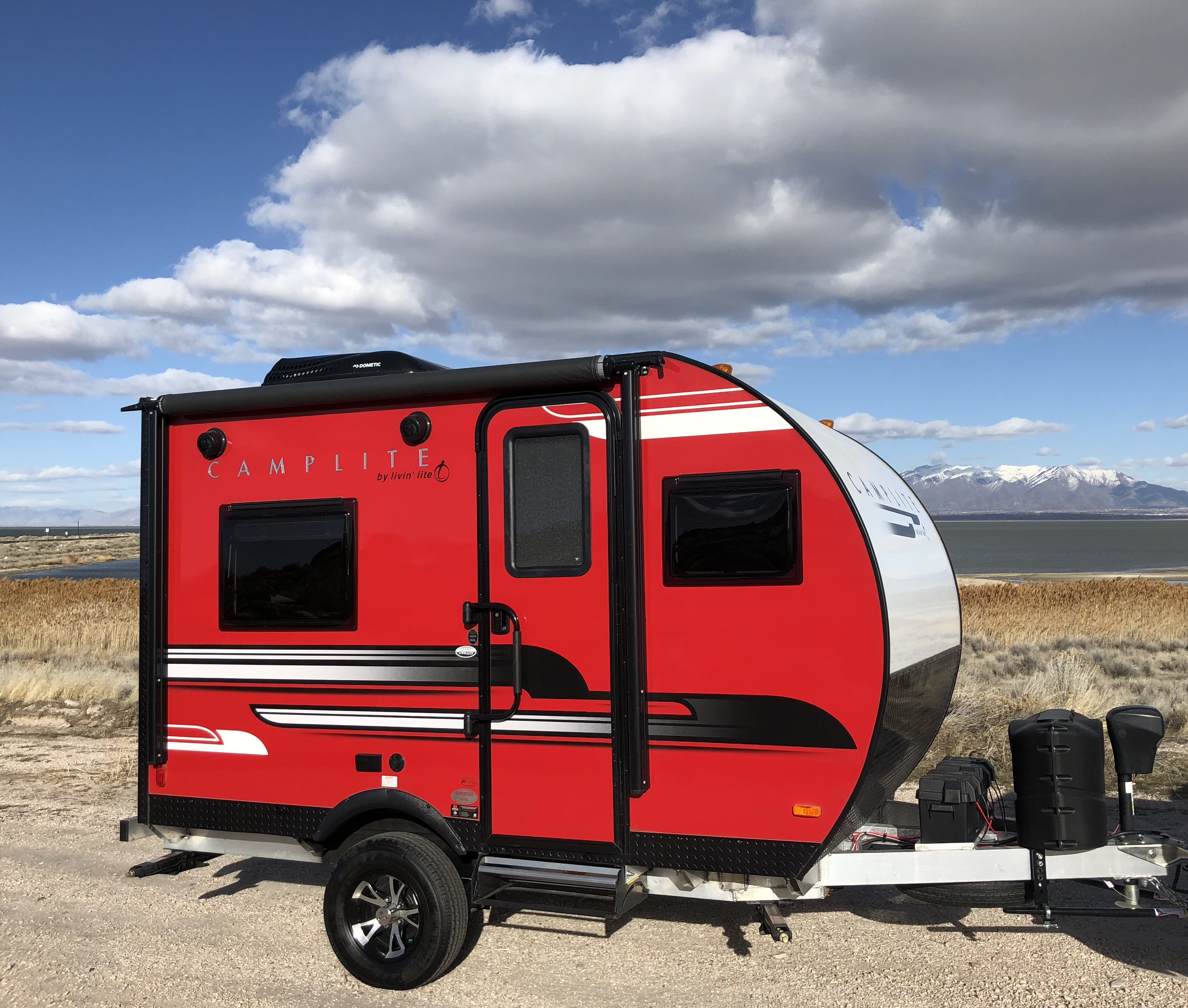
Travel trailer made by Livin Lite.

Livin Lite RV was an American manufacturer of recreation vehicles sold under the CampLite and QuickSilver brands. It was based in Shipshewana, Indiana. The company was most recently managed by KZ Inc., a subsidiary of Thor Industries. Livin Lite made truck campers, fold-down tent camping trailers, travel trailers, and toy haulers. They were known for their advanced lightweight aluminum construction techniques.

In February 2018, KZ told dealers that Livin Lite production would cease in the first half of 2018.

== History ==
The company was founded in 2003 in Wakarusa, Indiana by Scott Tuttle and acquired by Thor Industries in 2013. Tuttle's mission was to create lightweight all aluminum trailers with no wood that would last for decades—he called them "generational campers," because they were built so they could be passed down from one generation to the next. Tuttle remained president until 2015.

=== Tuttle years ===
The QuickSilver toy hauler was the primary product line in the early years. Livin Lite also built trailers to transport snowmobiles, para-planes, motorcycles, and racecars, along with mobile offices and toy haulers. Most of these were custom builds. In 2009, the first Livin Lite 10-foot travel trailer was produced under the CampLite name, featuring aluminum-laminated interior walls.

2011 brought about the first use of liquid propane appliances, including an electric water heater, furnace, and the replacement of the hand pump with an actual water tank and pump. The optional porta-potty was replaced with a cassette toilet.

Azdel, a composite made of a blend of polypropylene and fiberglass, became available shortly after CampLite's introduction, and replaced the cold look of the interior aluminum sidewalls. The change from aluminum interior walls to Azdel was popular, allowing for a softer, warmer interior by offering wood-look cabinetry while staying away from wood products. Livin Lite started offering two different colors of wood-look Azdel, and were able to maintain aluminum-framed cabinetry construction.

In 2012, the CampLite travel trailer front profile was redesigned to be more aerodynamic.

In 2013, they launched a fifth wheel trailer built with the same construction principles: aluminum chassis, aluminum frame, and no wood. Three lengths were offered: 26, 28, and, 32 foot.

=== Thor/KZ era ===
The Thor era began in the fall of 2013, but Tuttle stayed on until 2015. Thor's Crossroad's RV briefly managed Livin Lite, but Thor's KZ took over in early 2016. A few months after taking over the management of Livin Lite, KZ's senior managers stated their commitment to Livin Lite's all-aluminum roots in an interview with Rick Kessler of RV Business magazine. KZ president Aram Koltookian discussed the value proposition of Livin Lite's success in creating lightweight products. As an example of KZ's commitment, Koltookian highlighted how KZ General Manager Dave Boggs was able to re-source lighter materials removing 458 pounds from Livin Lite's 21-foot bunkhouse trailer.

RV Pro magazine reported on February 14, 2018, that dealers were told by KZ that Livin Lite's entire product line was being discontinued.

== Construction ==
The lightweight all aluminum frame, including the chassis, makes Livin Lite's towable products atypical in the RV industry. Even Airstream, with its aluminum shell and monocoque construction, utilizes a heavier steel chassis and builds its trailers on top of a wood floor. Floor rot and rusted frames are big problems in recreational vehicles, including Airstreams. Wood frames (walls and roof) are common in recreational vehicles and are no more durable than wood floors when they get wet. Livin Lite eliminated both the steel chassis, wood floors, wood frames, and wood finishes, creating a product designed so it won't rust or rot over time. Livin Lite cabinetry too is built on aluminum frames. Azdel is also used extensively in Livin Lite products, including as a wood substitute for cabinet finishes, in the walls, and on the roof.

Prior to 2015, CampLite and QuickSilver trailers had aluminum floors, walls, roofs, and exterior. Under Crossroads and KZ more fiberglass and composites were utilized instead of aluminum throughout. KZ has remained committed to the no wood and no steel vision of Livin Lite's founding years. During the brief Crossroads RV period circa 2015, wood was introduced to some models, which alienated some of the customer base. In 2016 KZ said they were returning to the company's no wood vision, although they would give customers the choice of wood on some cabinetry—while the infrastructure of the trailer would remain true to Tuttle's vision.
