= Elddis =

Company based in Count Durham, England

Elddis is a caravan and motorhome manufacturer based in Consett, County Durham, England.

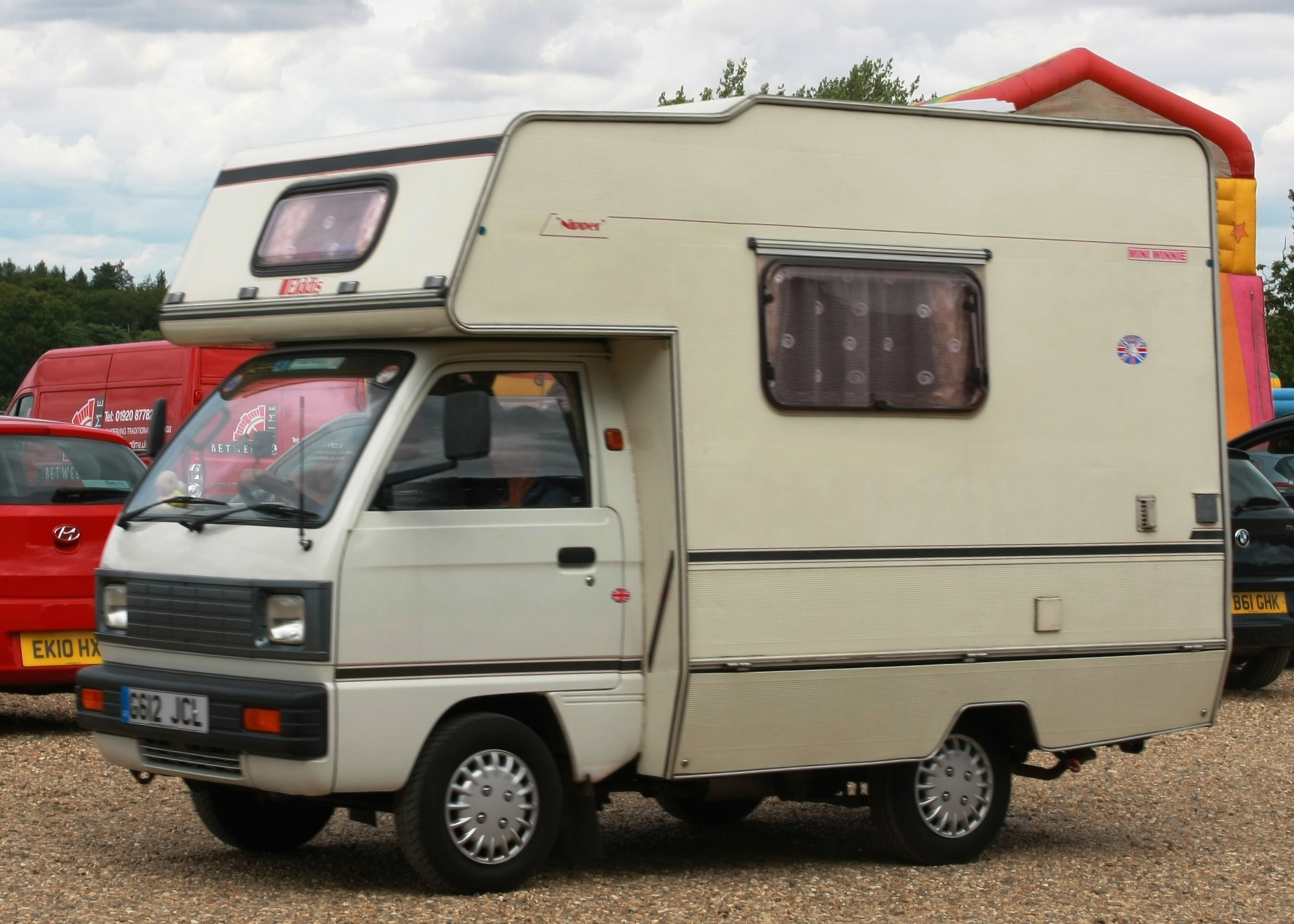
Bedford Rascal based "Elddis Nipper" motor home (1989) at Knebworth

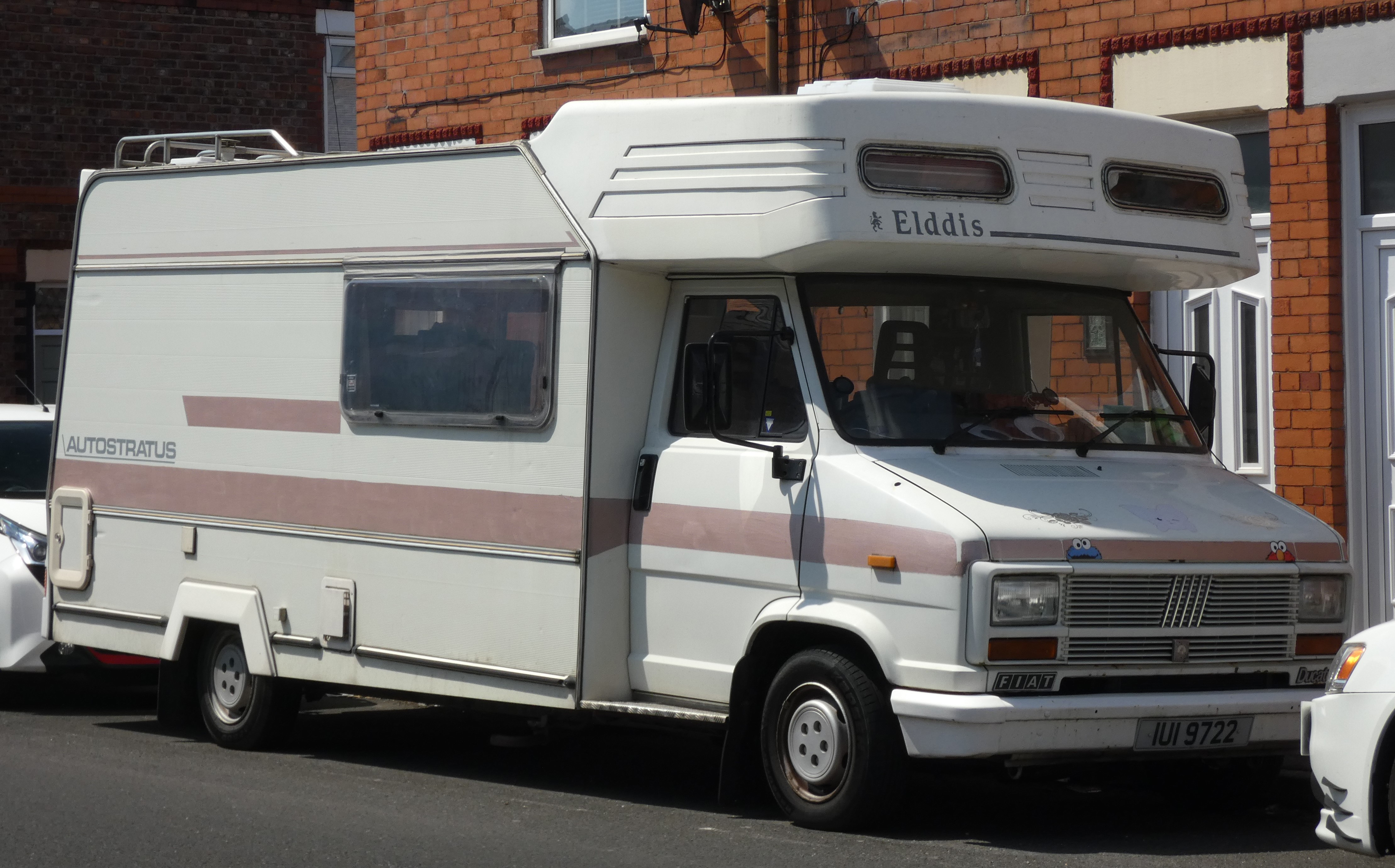
Fiat Ducato based "Elddis Autostratus" motor home (1988) in Warrington

== History ==
Elddis was founded in 1965 by Siddle Cook and his son, Raymond, and is named for 'Siddle' spelt backwards. They established a factory in Consett, County Durham, and in 1960, were manufacturing two popular models of caravan, Whirlwind and Tornado. A third model, Cyclone, was launched in the late 1960s. Its caravans were mainly named for meteorological phenomena like stratus etc. In 1973, Elddis was acquired by Ace Belmont International (ABI), a company formed the previous year by a merger between Ace Caravans and Belmont Caravans.

Elddis was later acquired by The Explorer Group who were in turn acquired by Erwin Hymer Group in 2017. They own the brands Compass and Buccaneer, plus the intellectual property rights to the brand Crown which they acquired in 1989 following a demerger from ABI who sold out to Swift caravans.
