= Zündapp Janus =

Car model

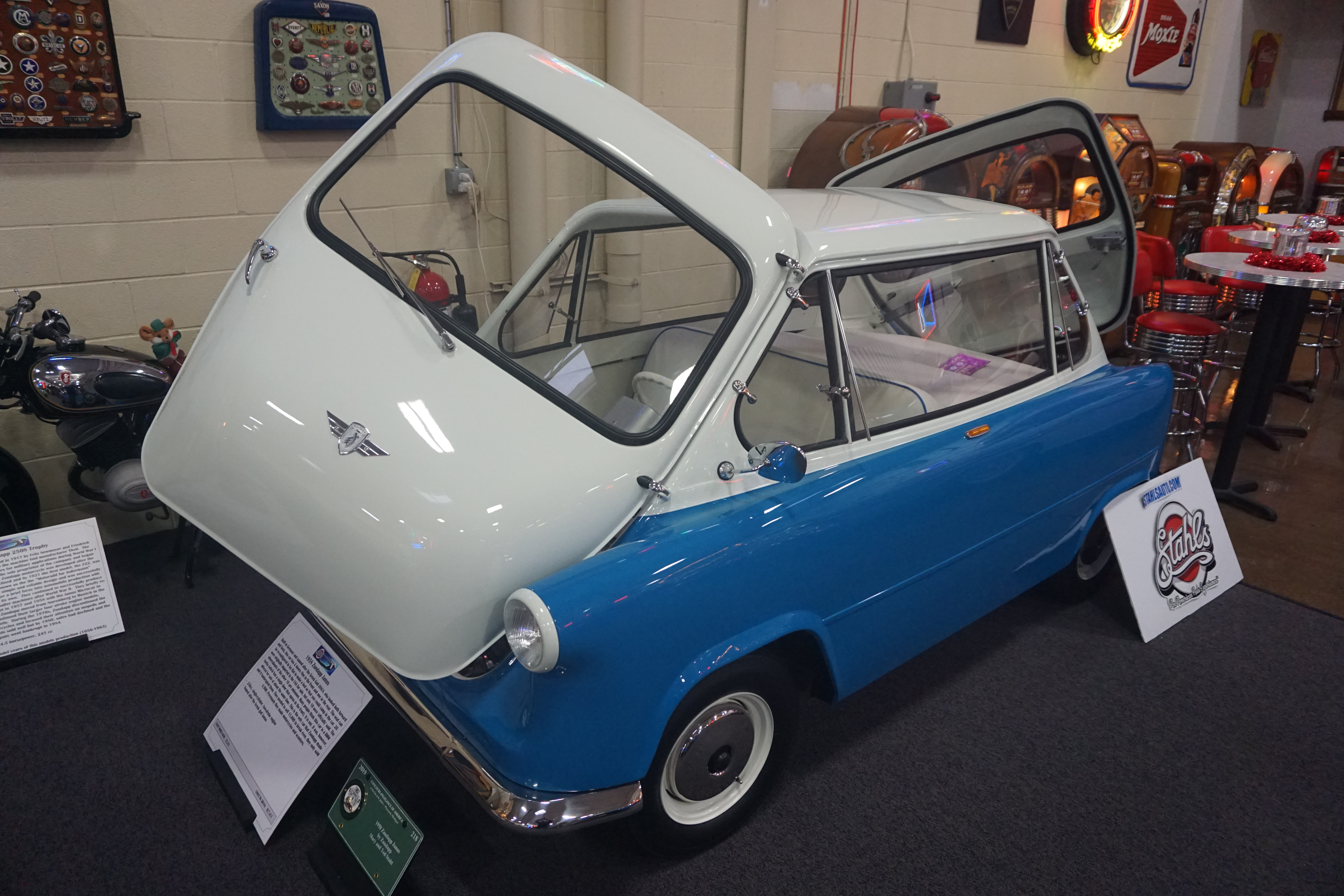
1958 Zündapp Janus at Stahls Automotive Collection

The Zündapp Janus is a microcar model made by Zündapp in Germany between 1957 and 1958, as the only car ever built by the company.

== Dornier Delta ==
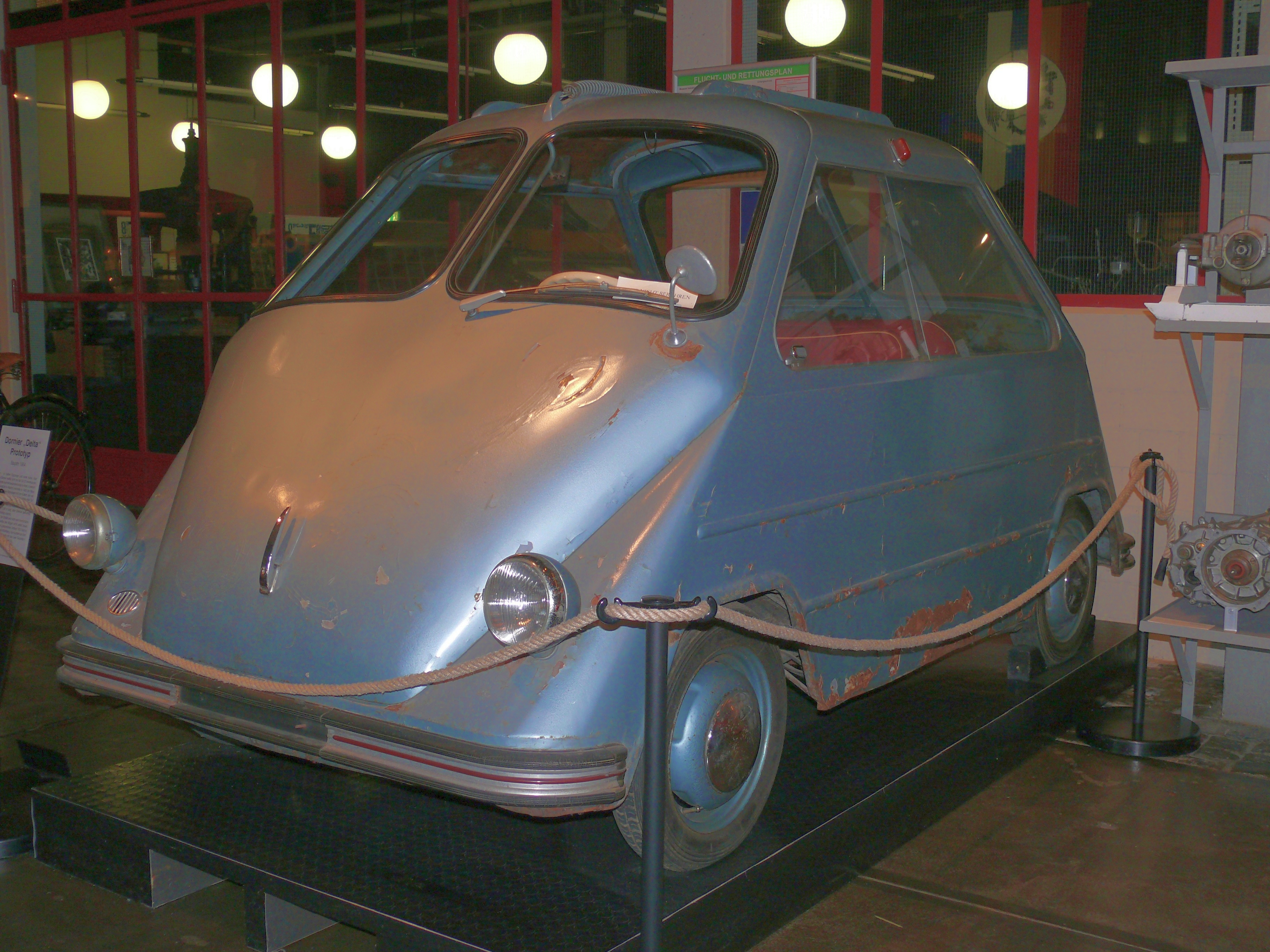
Dornier Delta prototype

Claude Dornier was always trying to minimize the dependency of his company Dornier Flugzeugwerke on building aircraft, by diversification into other areas. After World War II, and the Allied ban on aircraft production in Germany until the late 1950s, Claude diversified the company's production and encouraged his son Claudius to find new areas. As a result, Claudius designed and developed a four-seater car, where the two front and two rear passengers sat back to back, for optimal use of the enclosed space. A prototype was built and tested, which was named Dornier Delta. The company had not built a car before, and economic calculations showed that the volume of sales required would make it uneconomical for the company to make the car using its existing facilities.

Zündapp was a motorcycle maker, but in 1954 decided to make a more weatherproof vehicle. They looked for partners who could design such a vehicle, and approached Kroboth, Brütsch, and Fuldamobil before settling on the ready-developed vehicle from Dornier.

== Zündapp Janus ==
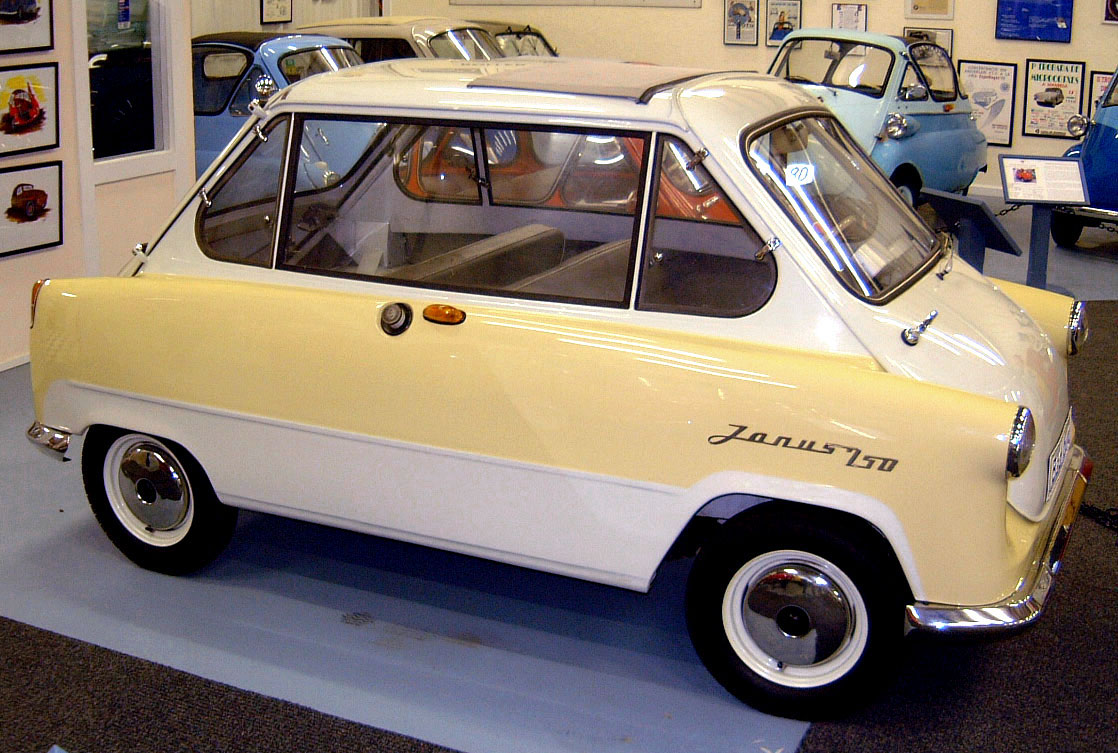
The car's side view.

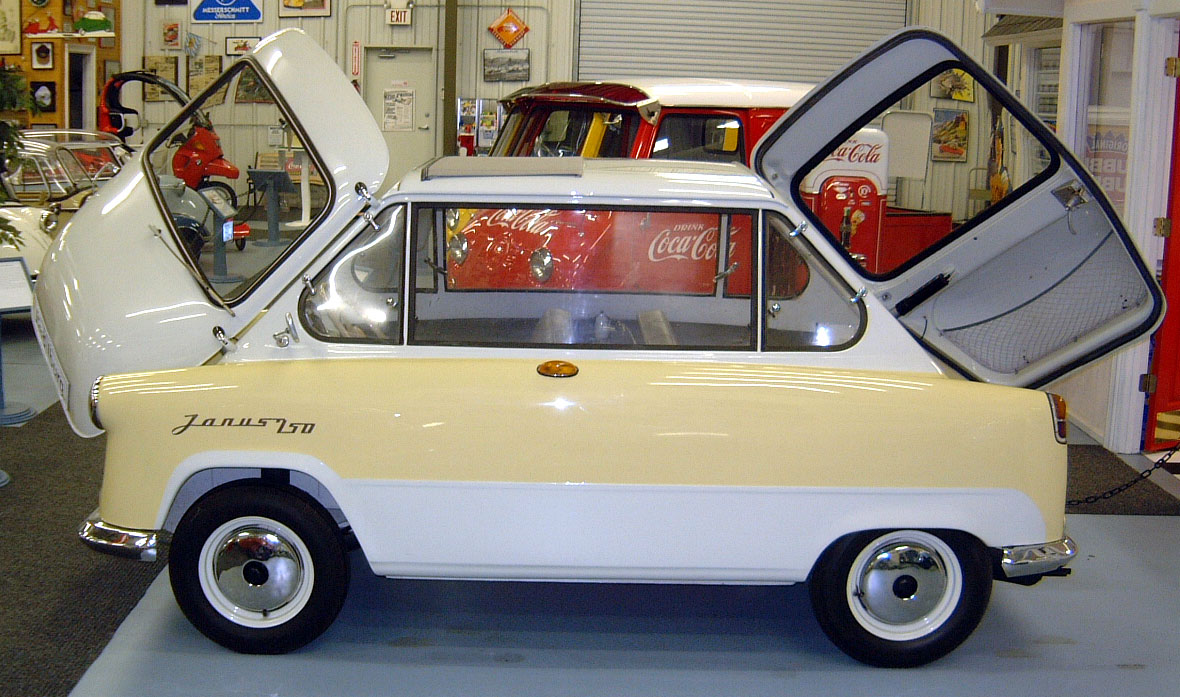
The Zündapp Janus had doors in the front and rear.

Under a commercial agreement, Dornier licensed Zündapp to produce and market the car. With the goal of producing a "quality bubble car", the concept was developed further, using Zündapp's engineering input. The resulting novel design featured a front-opening door for access to the front seat, as well as a rear-opening door for access to the rear-facing rear seat. This "coming or going" design was given the name of the Roman god, Janus, usually pictured having two faces: one looks forward while the other one looks back. The car was powered by a mid-mounted two-stroke, single-cylinder, 245 cubic centimetres (15.0 cu in) engine unique to the Janus, developing 14 hp (10 kW), enabling a top speed of 80 km/h (50 mph). The front suspension was of the leading arm-type that proved to be very comfortable, and in the rear the car had a swing axle. The company added four individually mounted ventilated brake drums, operated via hydraulics.

Production started in June 1957, but with little sales success, only 1,731 cars were made in the first six months. One reason was the suboptimal handling: With an engine that was much lighter than the rear passengers, the advantages usually associated with a mid-engine configuration in racing and sports cars did not apply, and the centre of gravity changed a lot depending on how many passengers were present. Secondly, the car lacked the most modern elements seen on competitors' cars, and was not low priced. By mid-1958, having made only a total of 6,902 cars, Zündapp abandoned the project and sold the factory to Bosch.

=== In popular culture ===
In the animated feature film Cars 2, Professor Zündapp is based on a 1957 Zündapp Janus.

== Dornier Delta II ==
During the mid-1960s, Dornier developed the Delta II with Hymer AG. The vehicle could carry up to six passengers and offered two sleeping places for camping. The development never got beyond the prototype stage.
