= Heartland Recreational Vehicles =

American manufacturer of recreational vehicles

Heartland RVs
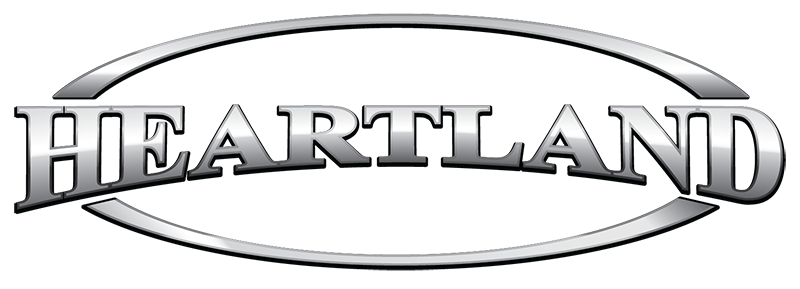
- Company type: Subsidiary
- Industry: Recreational Vehicles
- Founded: 2003
- Founder: Brian Brady
- Headquarters: Elkhart, Indiana. Howe, Indiana + Sturgis, Michigan., United States
- Key people: Chris Hermon, President
- Number of employees: 1,100
- Parent: Thor Industries
- Website: heartlandrvs.com

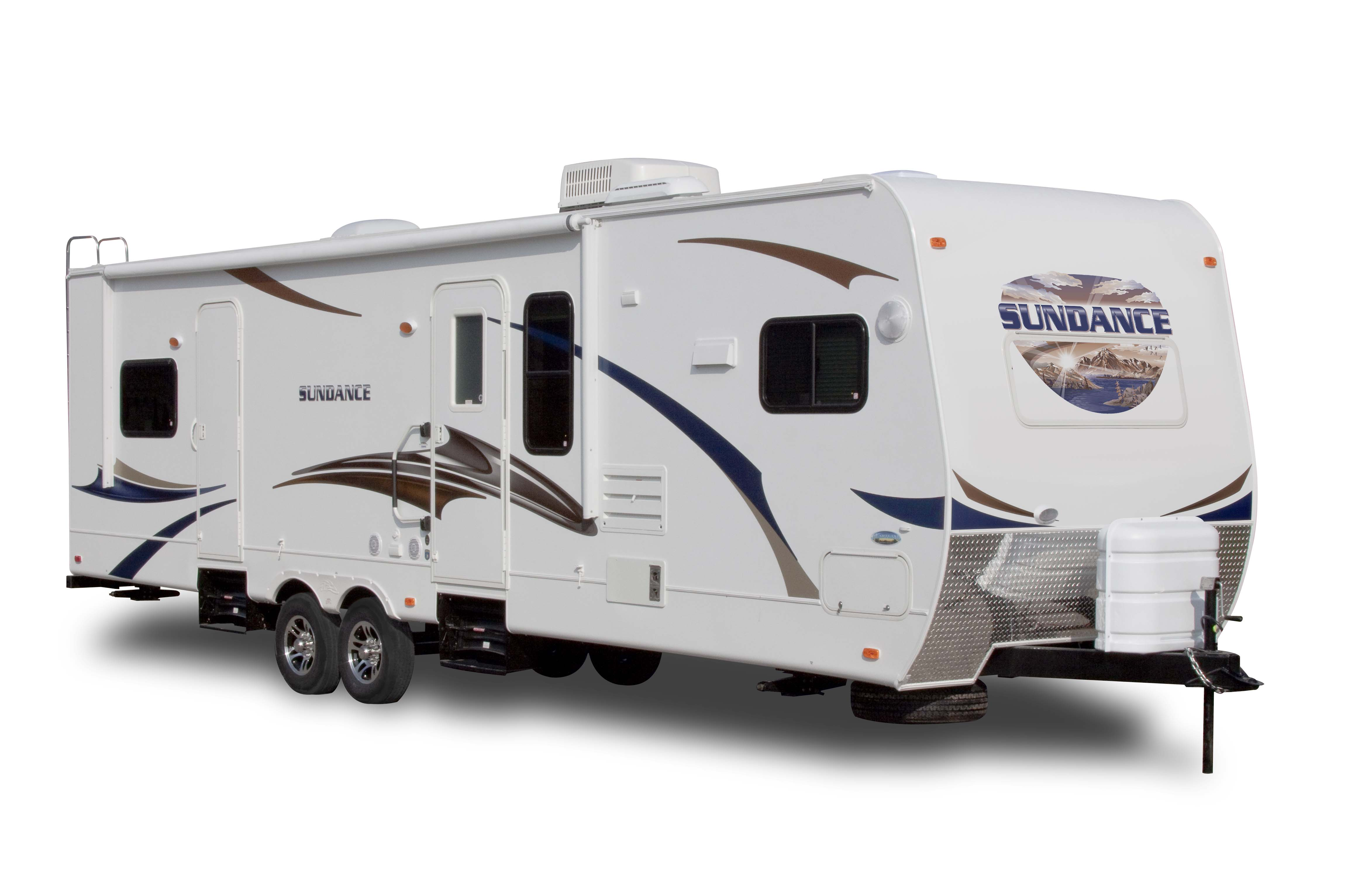
Side view of a 2011 Sundance travel trailer, built by Heartland Recreational Vehicles

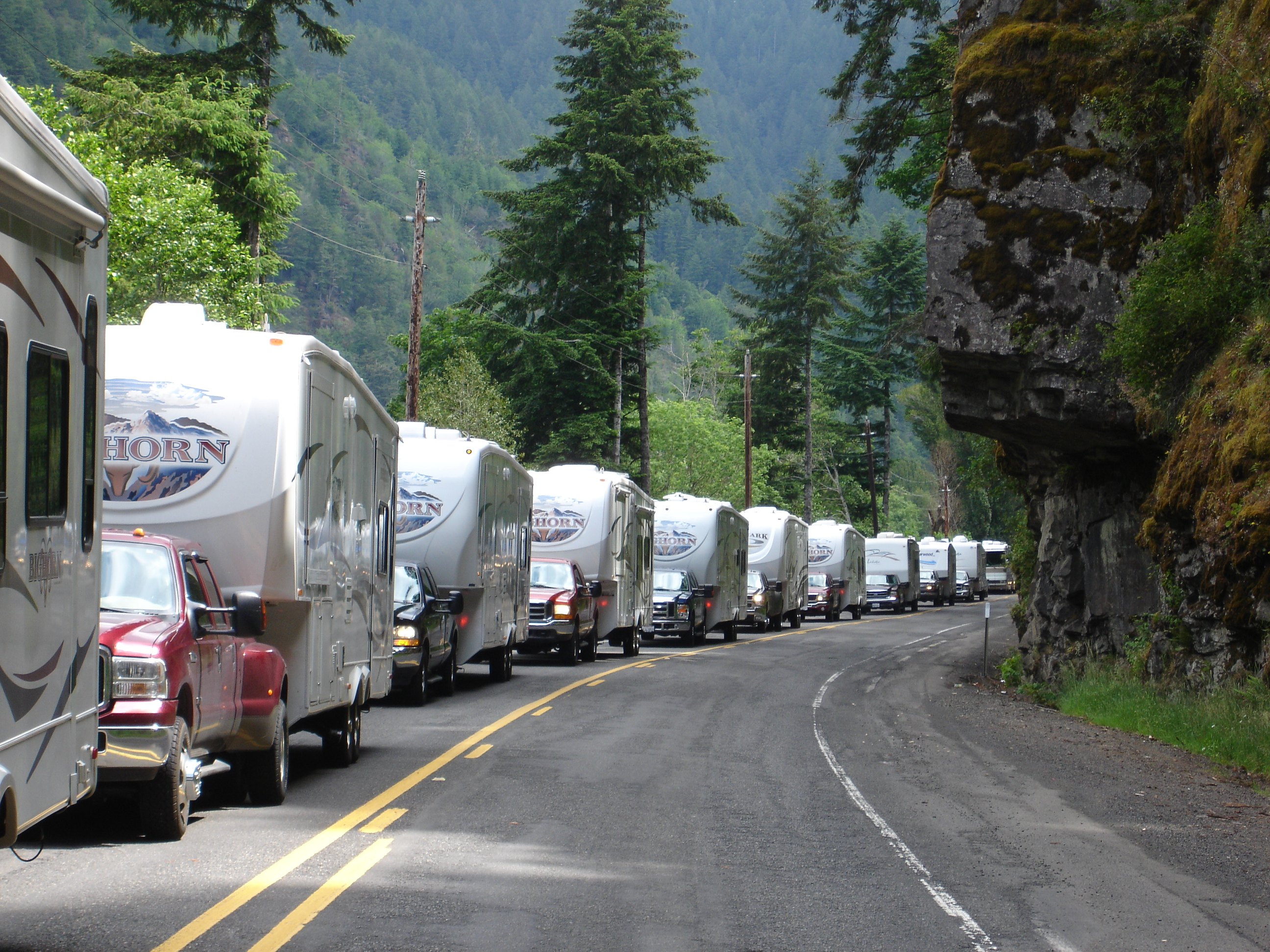
Caravan of Heartland Bighorn RVs on the way to the Summer 2009 Oregon Rally in Winchester, Oregon

Heartland RVs is an American manufacturer of recreational vehicles located in Elkhart, Indiana. Founded by former Damon Corp. CEO Brian Brady in 2003, it was purchased and became a subsidiary of Thor Industries in 2010.

== History ==
Heartland RV was founded in December 2003 by a group of RV industry veterans led by Brian Brady, formerly President and CEO of Damon Corp. The company started production in March 2004 with a 5th wheel under the Landmark brand name which was introduced in December 2004 at the Louisville Show.

Catterton Partners, a Connecticut-based private equity firm that focuses on consumer business, made an equity investment in Heartland in February 2007.

On February 2, 2010, Heartland RV acquired the remaining active trademarks of the towable brands of Fleetwood Enterprises, Inc.

On September 17, 2010, Thor Industries, Inc. (THO) acquired Heartland Recreational Vehicles, LLC.

On May 29, 2012, Chris Hermon became the President of Heartland RV, replacing retired founding President, Brian Brady.
