= Hymer =

Motorhome and caravan manufacturer

Hymer AG
- Industry: Recreational vehicles
- Founded: 1923
- Founder: Erwin Hymer & Erich Bachem
- Headquarters: Bad Waldsee, Germany
- Area served: Europe, Japan, South East Asia and New Zealand
- Products: Motorhomes, Caravans
- Revenue: €2,780 million (2011/2012)
- Operating income: €859 million (2011/2012)
- Number of employees: 2,600 (2010/2011)
- Website: Hymer (English)

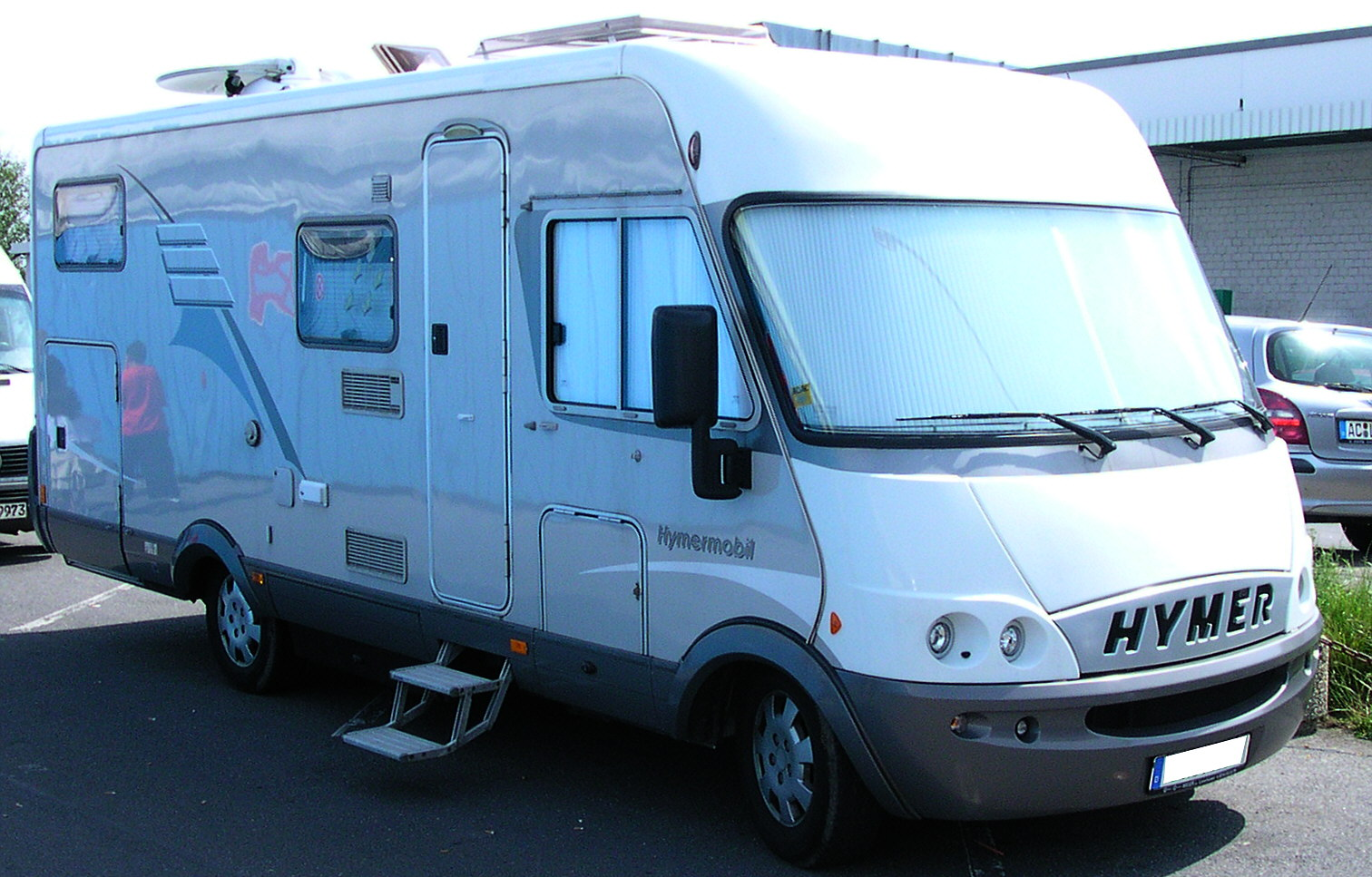
Hymermobil B SL

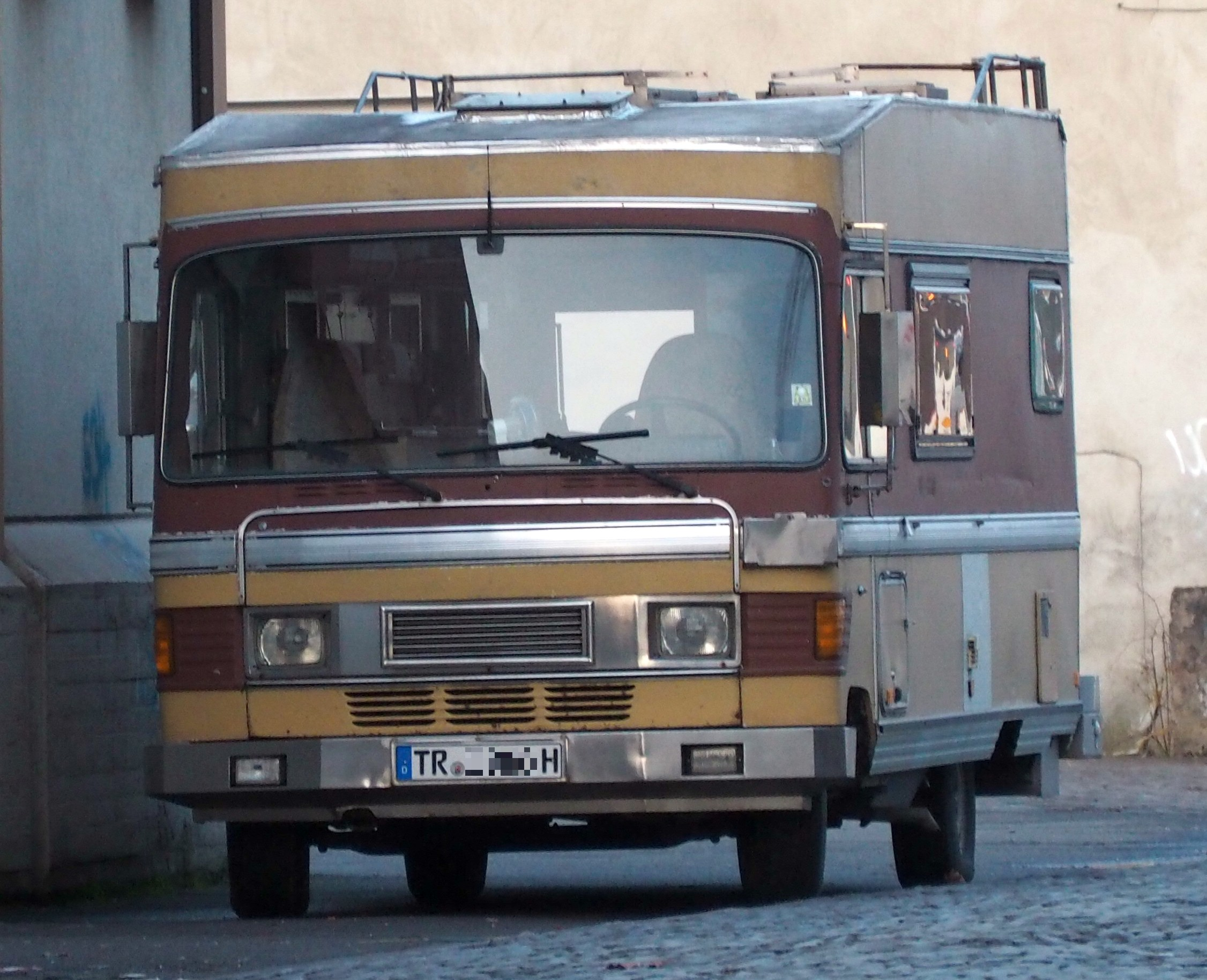
Mercedes-based Hymermobil built around 1980

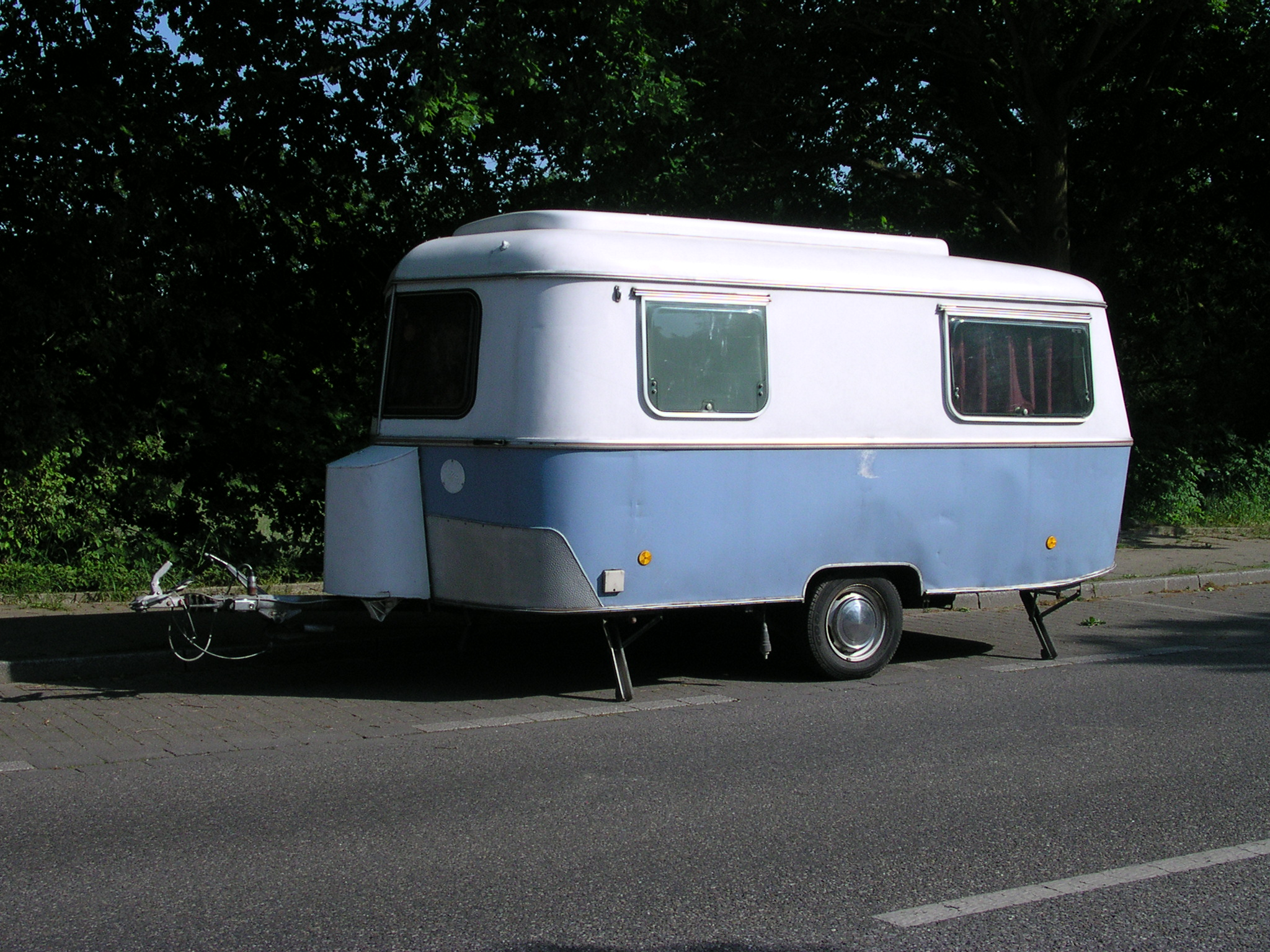
Eriba Triton

Hymer AG is a motorhome and caravan manufacturer, located in Bad Waldsee, Germany. Hymer AG owns several brands, including; Bürstner, Carado, Sunlight, Etrusco, Elddis, Hymer, Laika, LMC, Niesmann + Bischoff, Dethleffs, Eriba, as well as camping equipment wholesale Movera. In February 2017 it acquired The Explorer Group based in Consett, UK adding the Elddis, Buccaneer, Compass and Xplore brands to its portfolio. In 2018, Thor Industries acquired Hymer.

== History ==
Alfons Hymer, the father of Erwin Hymer, had operated a repair shop in Bad Waldsee since 1923. In 1956, Erich Bachem made the first caravan to a customer order, and in 1957 designer Erwin Hymer created the prototype "Eriba" range, the original Trolls.As a result, that same year the two formed the new distribution company Hymer AG, and in 1958 the company began production of the Eriba-Troll range, which is still in production today. The first Hymer motorhome was produced in 1961, the Caravano. During the mid-1960s, Dornier Flugzeugwerke and Hymer developed the Dornier Delta II, a development of the earlier Zündapp Janus. The vehicle could carry up to six passengers and offered two sleeping places for camping, but was never developed beyond the prototype stage. However, from 1971, serial production of motorcaravans started under the Hymer brand. In 1980, the Hymer and Eriba companies formally merged, before also merging with Dethleffs and TEC to form CMC. Since 1990, the company became publicly traded. In 1995, the company became the first caravan manufacturer to become ISO 9001 certified. In 1996, Hymer took over Niesmann + Bischoff GmbH, and in 1998 added Burstner. In the same year the camping accessories wholesaler Movera was founded. In 2000, Hymer AG acquired the Italian motorhome manufacturer Laika. The 100,000th leisure vehicle left the factory in October 2004. In 2005/6 Hymer and Dethleffs established of Capron Ltd., which distributes vehicles under the Carado and Sunlight brands.

On 29 October 2011, the €17 million Erwin Hymer Museum opened in Bad Waldsee.

In 2016, Hymer acquired esteemed North American Class B RV manufacturer Roadtrek, and created the subsidiary Erwin Hymer NA (North America) to manage the acquisition.

In 2018, Thor Industries acquired Erwin Hymer (Europe) without Erwin Hymer NA and Roadtrek because of financial irregularities uncovered at Erwin Hymer NA (during due diligence investigations as required by the sale). Erwin Hymer NA subsequently fired the CEO, and COO, halted work at four factories in Ontario, laid off approximately 850 workers, and went into Canadian receivership.

== The Explorer Group ==
The Explorer Group, a subsidiary of Hymer, is the United Kingdom's second largest manufacturer of caravans, based in Consett. The Explorer Group produces Elddis, Buccaneer, Compass and Xplore brands.

== Roadtrek ==
In 2019, Rapido Group acquired Roadtrek from Erwin Hymer Group North America. Rapido Group's Roadtrek is in Kitchener, Ontario, Canada. The Roadtrek motorhome company was founded in 1980 by Jac Hanemaayer. Roadtrek Inc.'s headquarters is in Cambridge, Ontario, Canada. Rapido has specialized in building Class B Vans and also rebuilding Westfalia vans.

== Sales ==
In financial year 2010/2011, Hymer Group turned over €792 million, with a workforce of 2,600 creating 14,243 motorhomes and 6,317 caravans. The Hymer Group operates from factories in:

== Locations ==
Germany: Bad Waldsee, Kehl, Isny im Allgäu, Leutkirch im Allgäu, Sassenberg, Polch, Neustadt in Sachsen
France: Wissembourg
Italy: Tavarnelle Val di Pesa
UK: Consett
(Canada: Kitchener, Ontario, Roadtrek from 2016 to 2019)

== Gallery ==
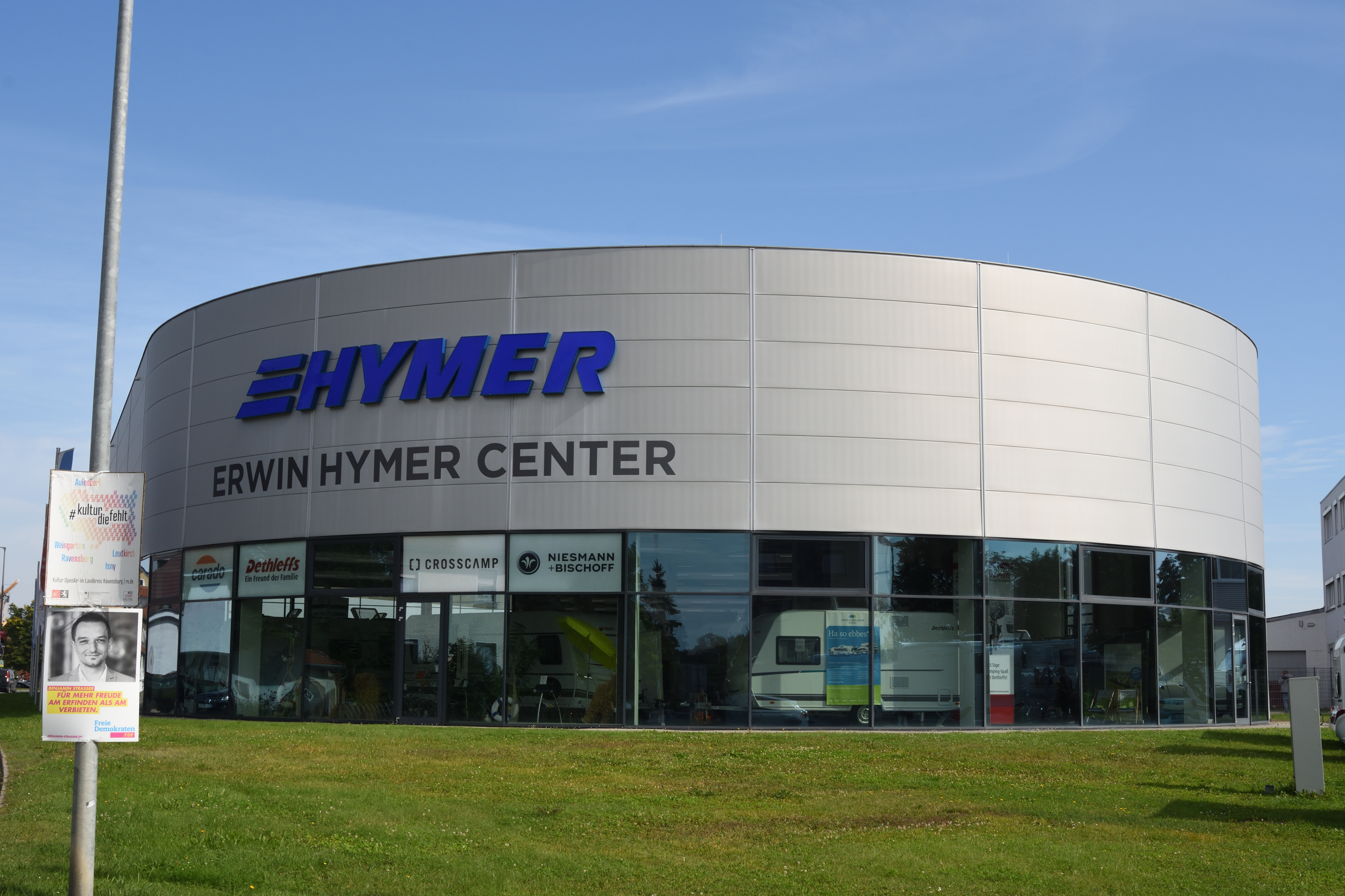
Hymer Center in Bad Waldsee

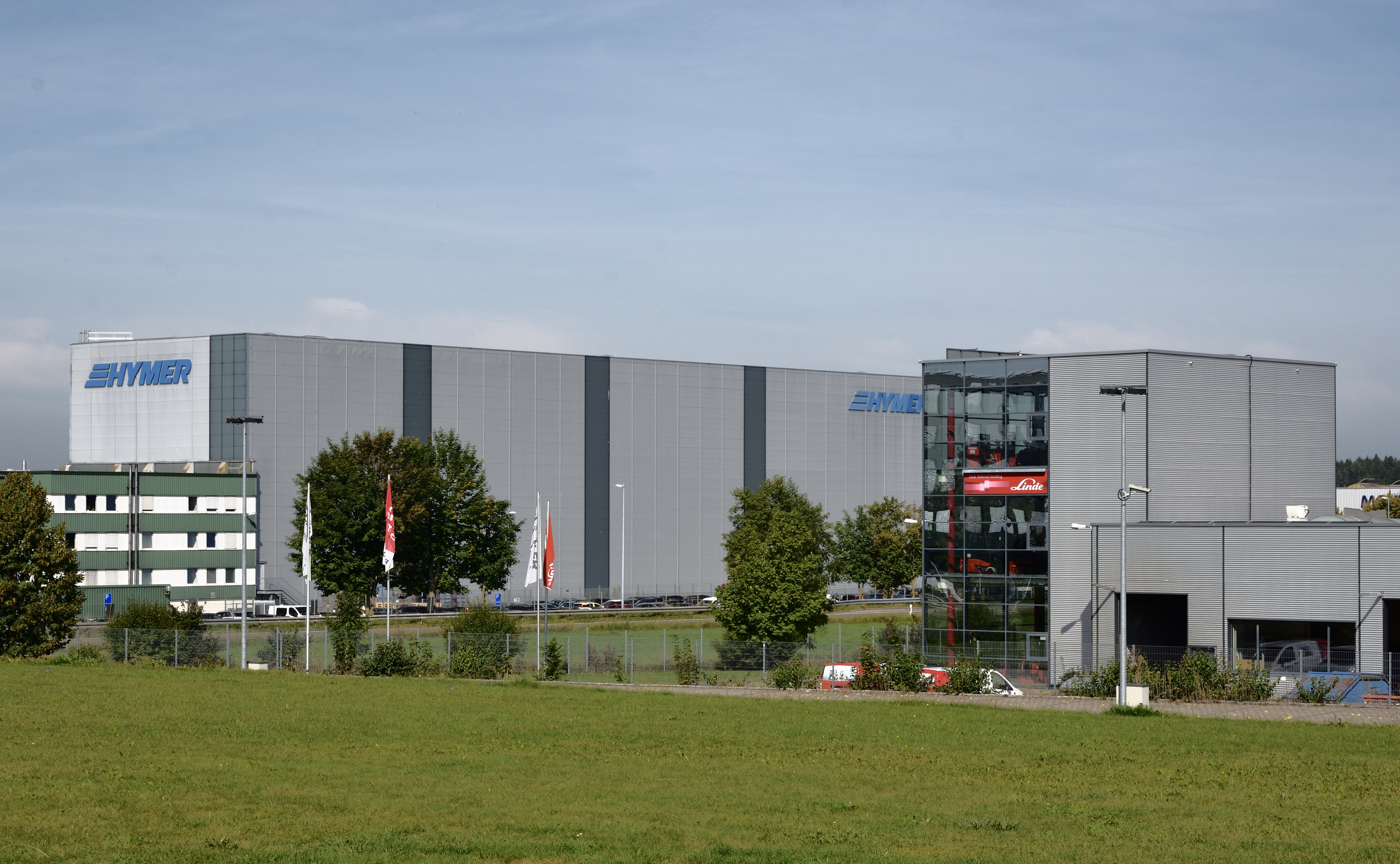
Hymer Group production near Bad Waldsee

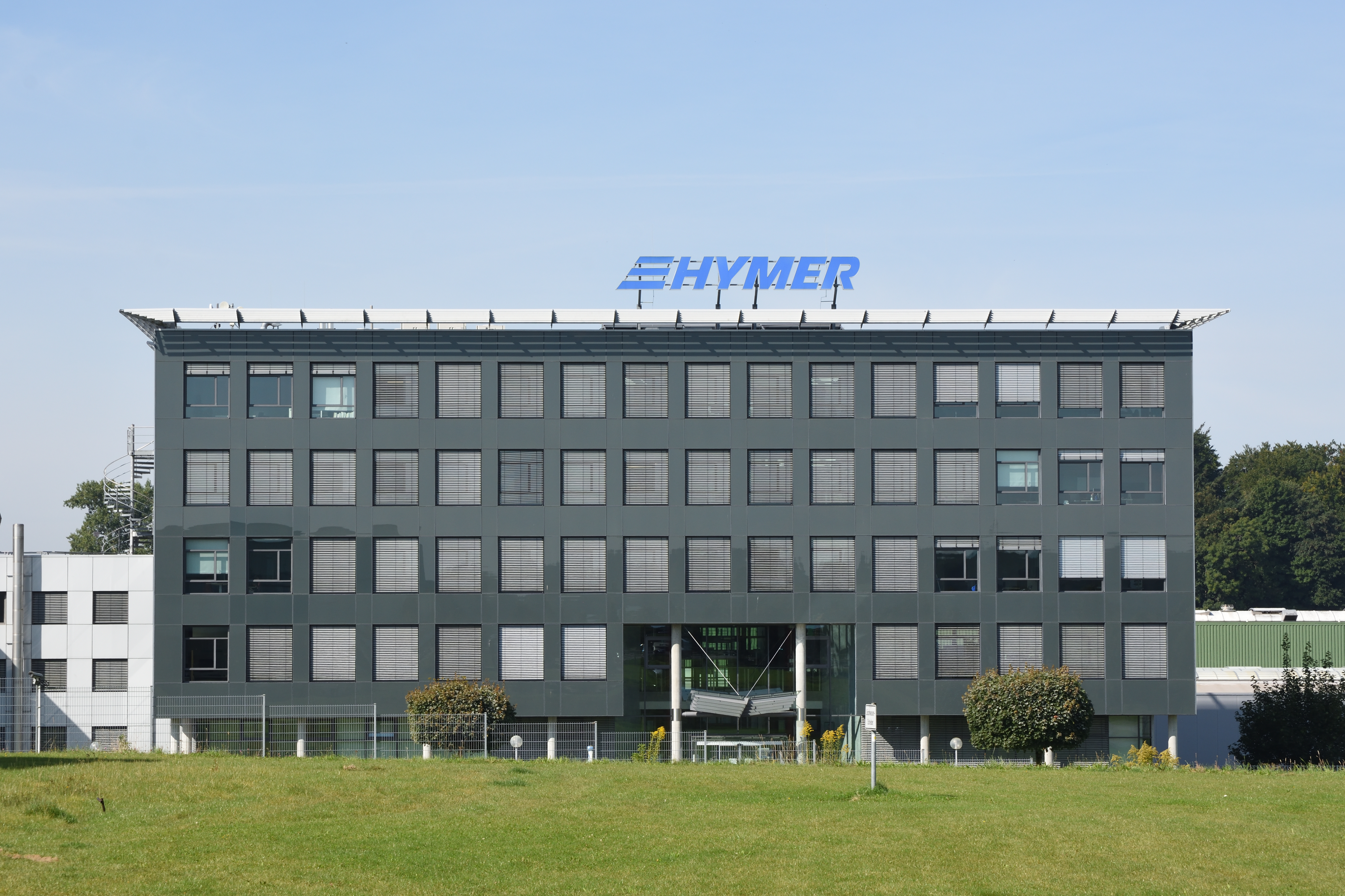
Administration building near Bad Waldsee

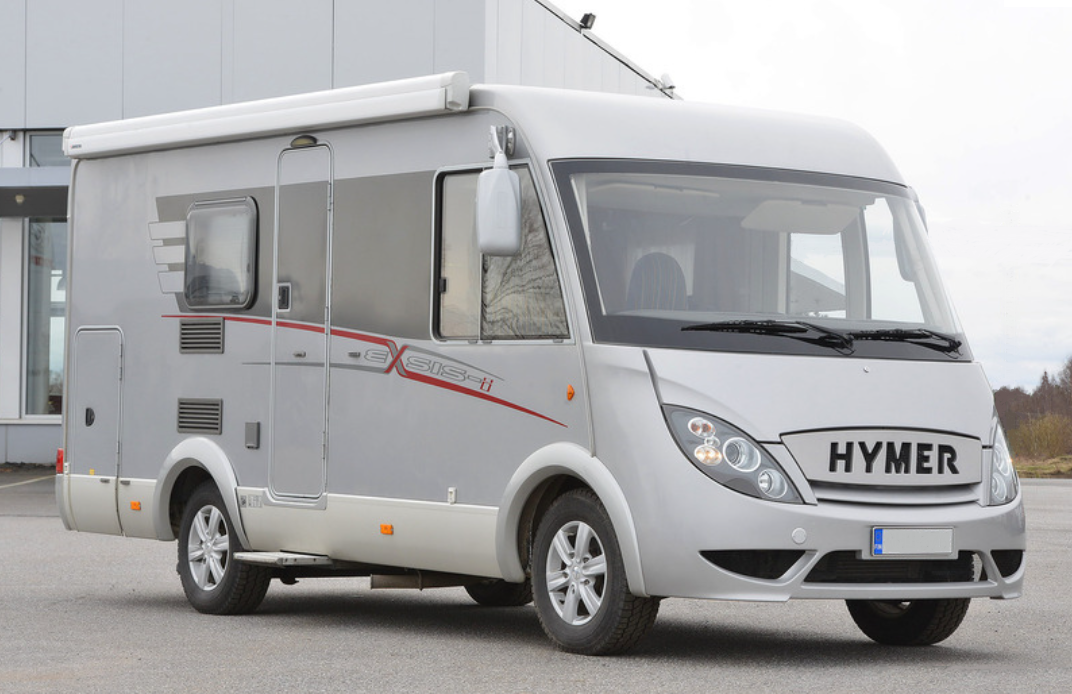
Hymer Exsis

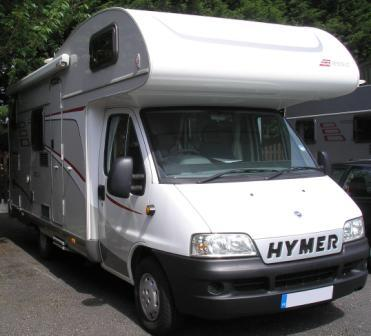
Hymer Motorhome

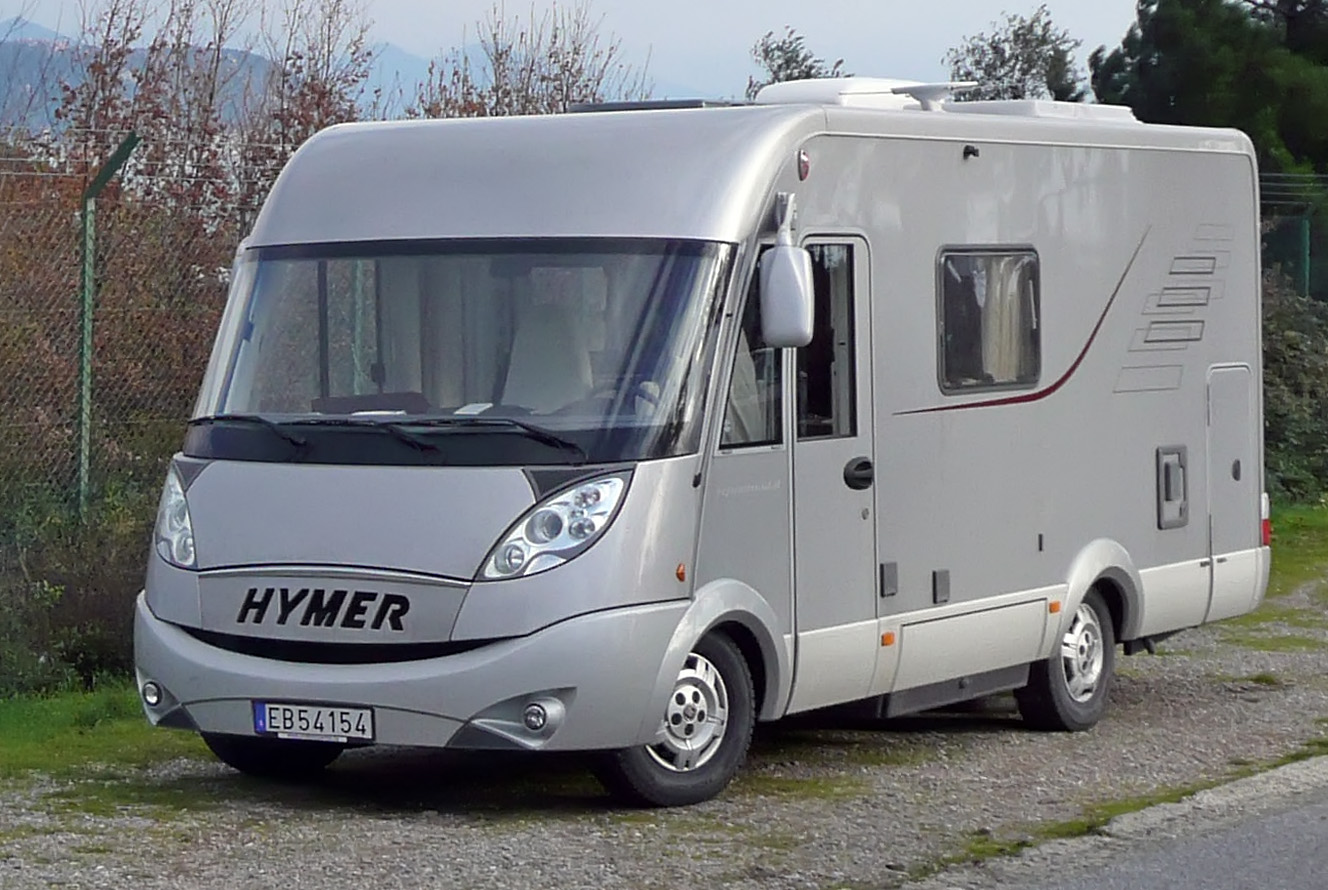
Hymer Mobile Home B 524 SL

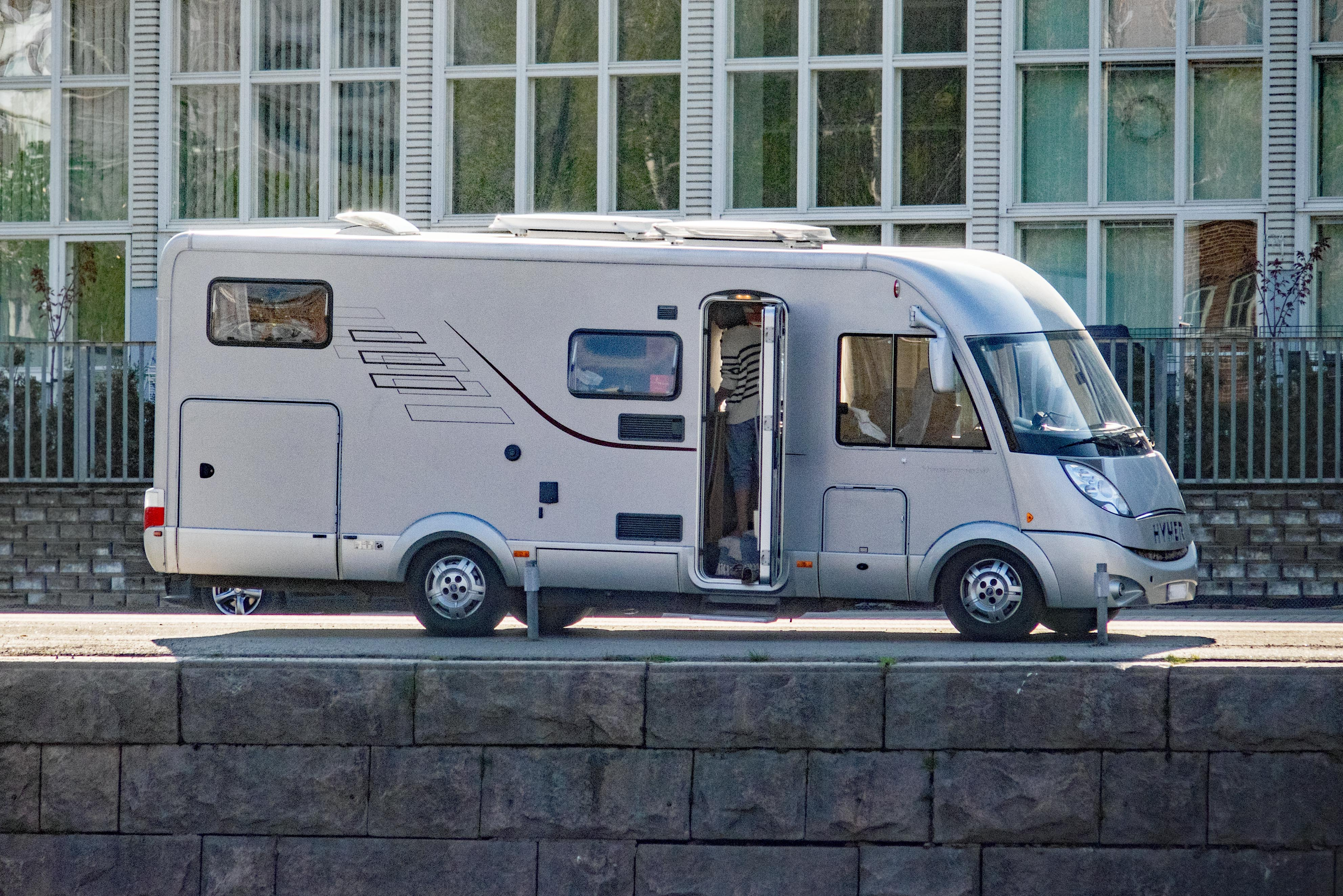
Hymer RV by Aura River

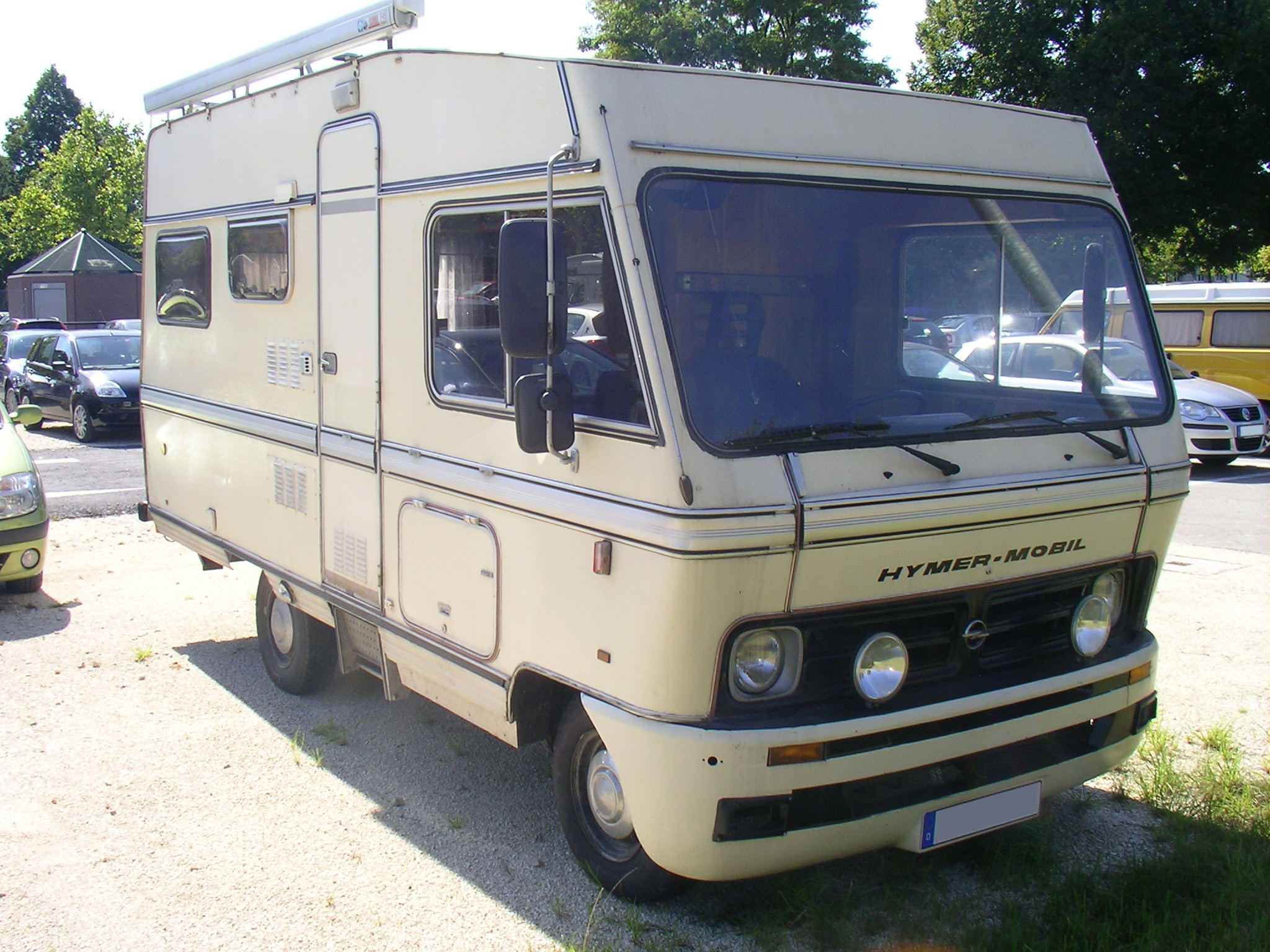
Bedford Blitz Hymer

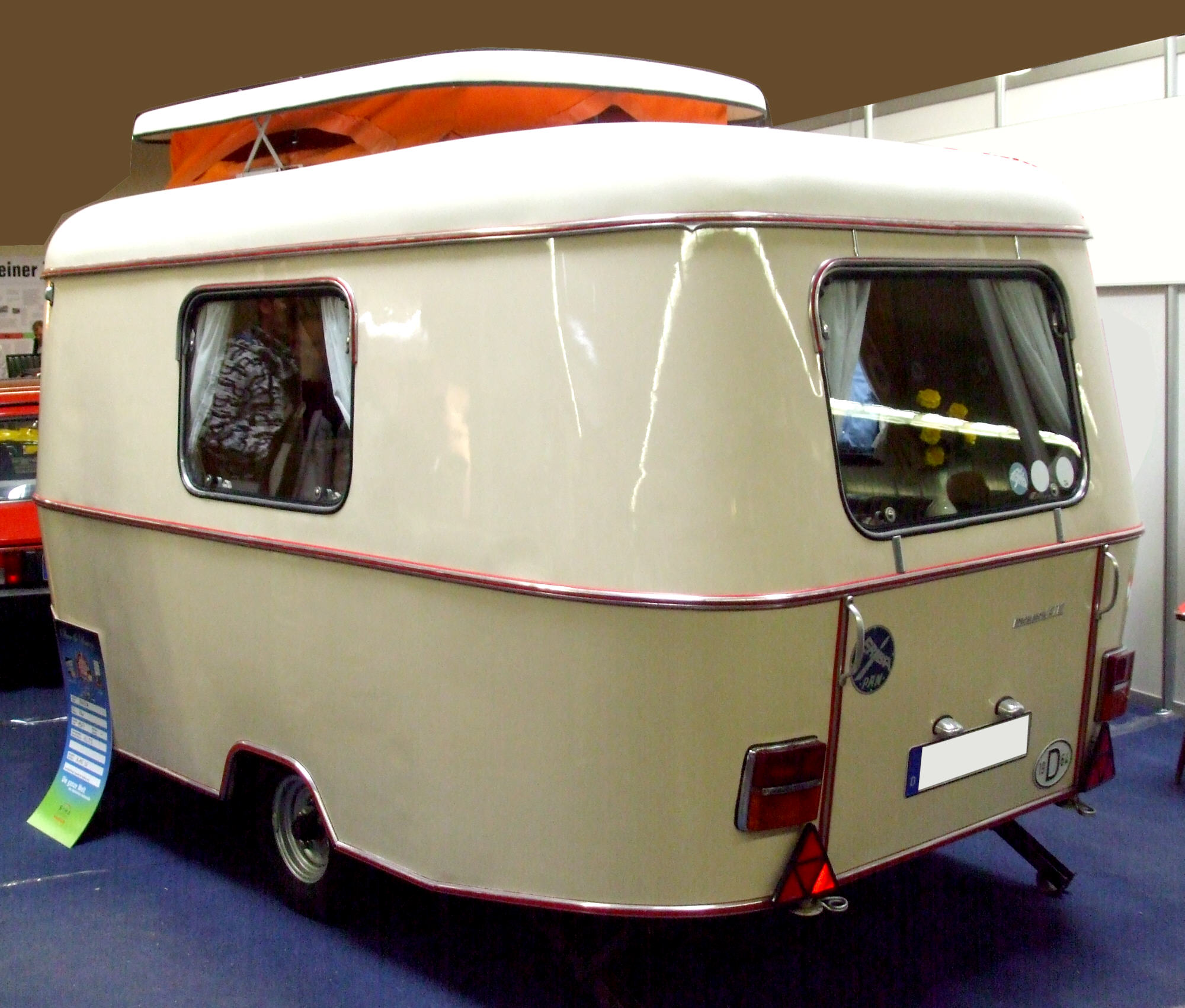
1964 Eriba Pan

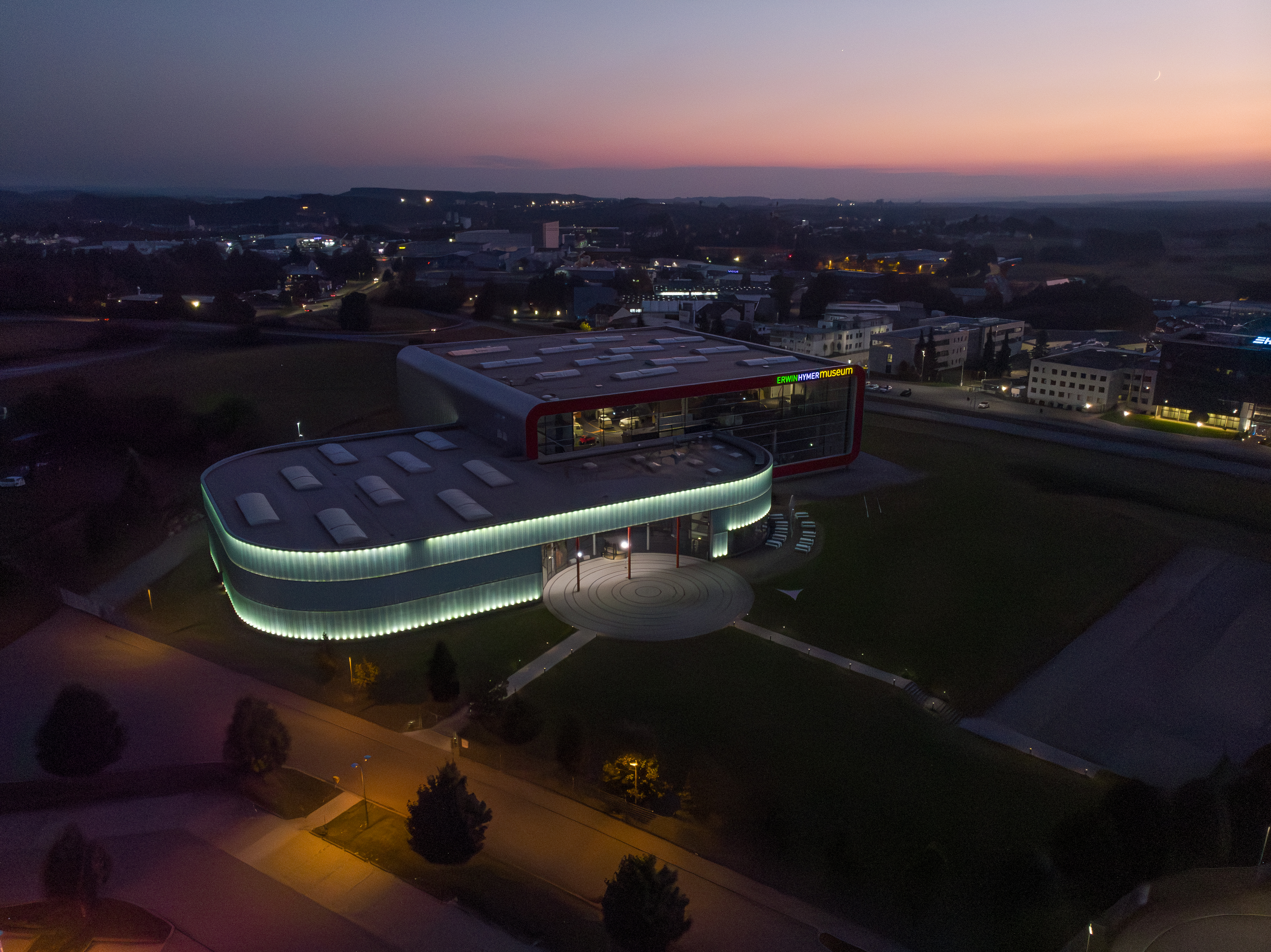
Erwin Hymer Museum

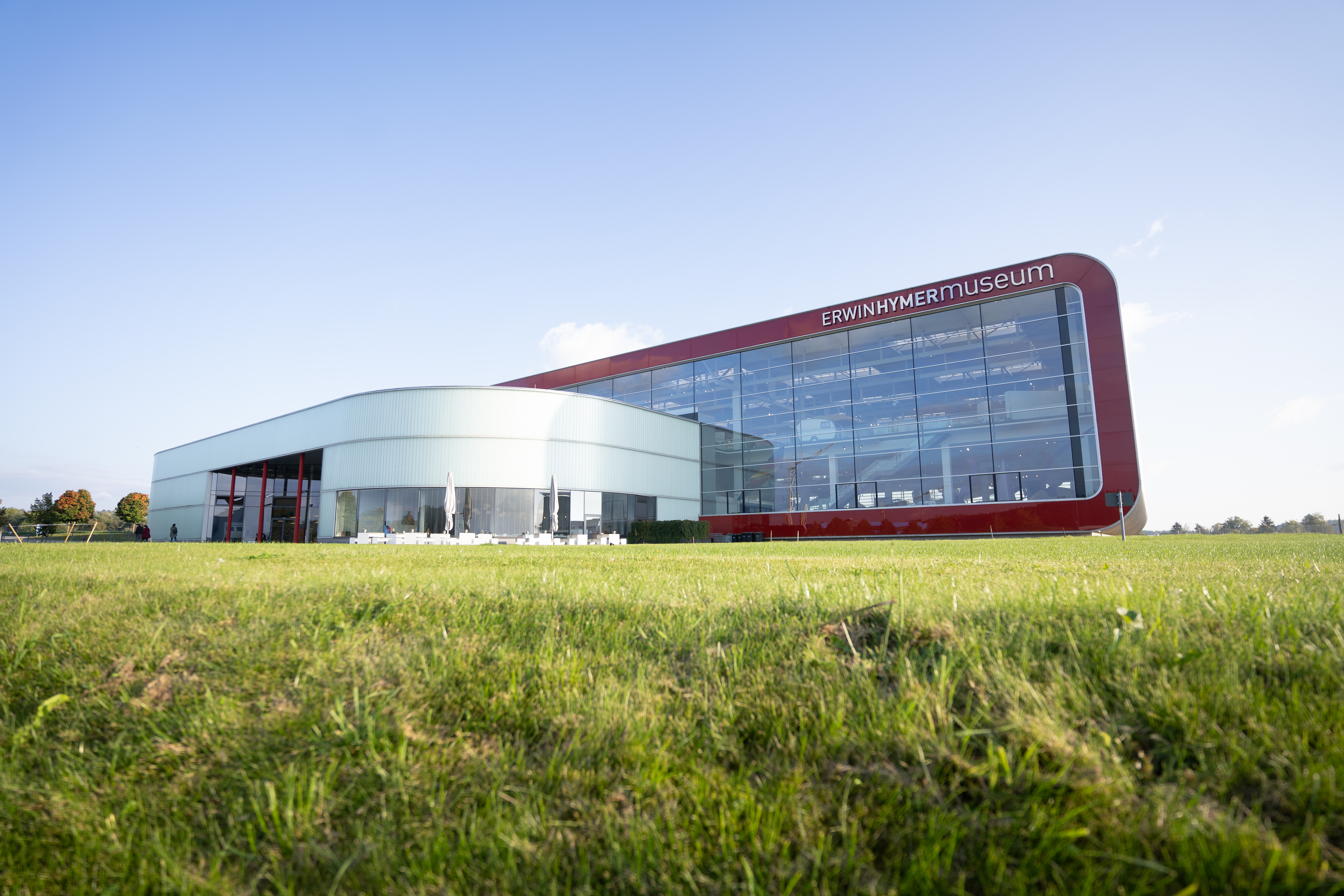
Erwin Hymer Museum

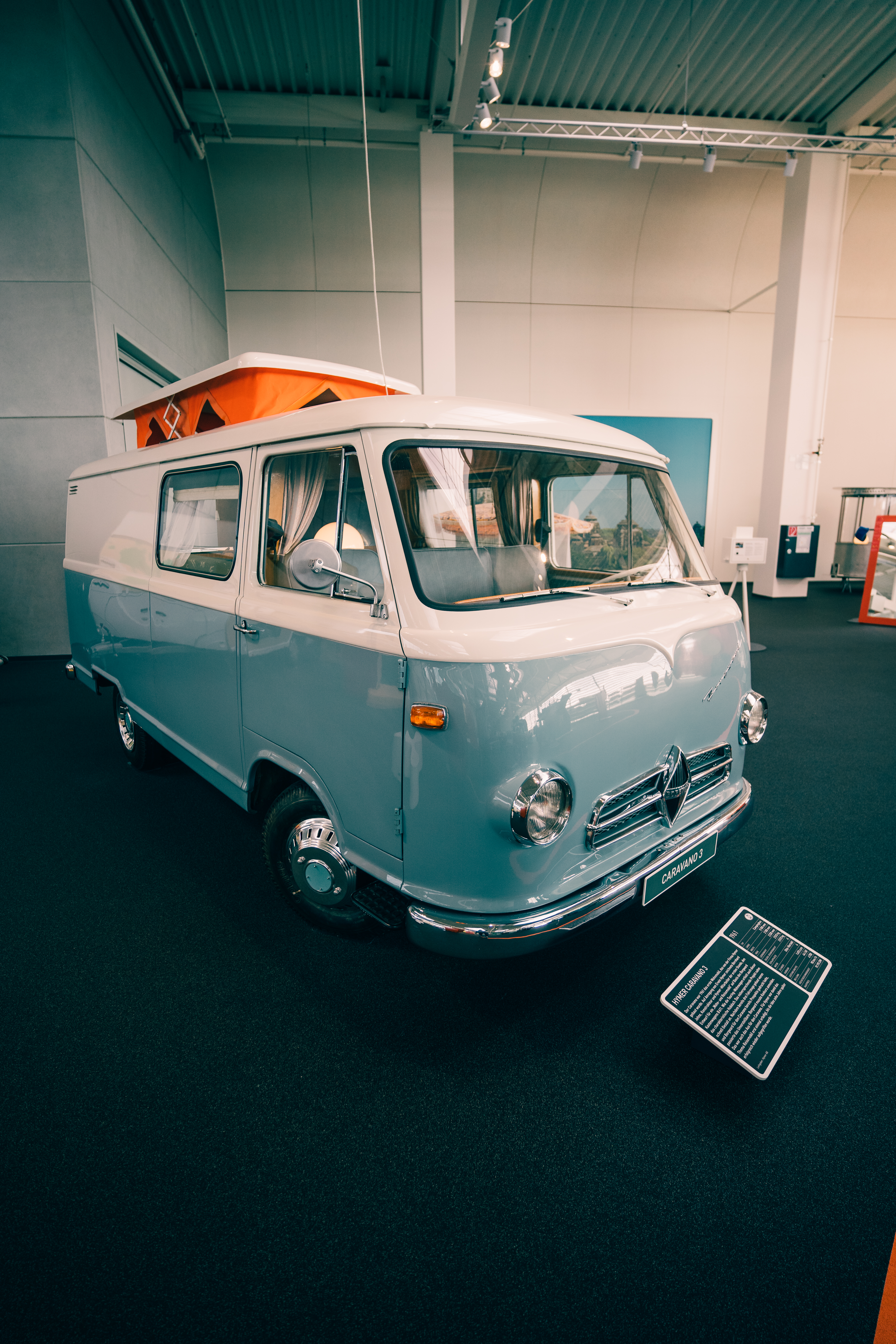
Musée Erwin Hymer Museum

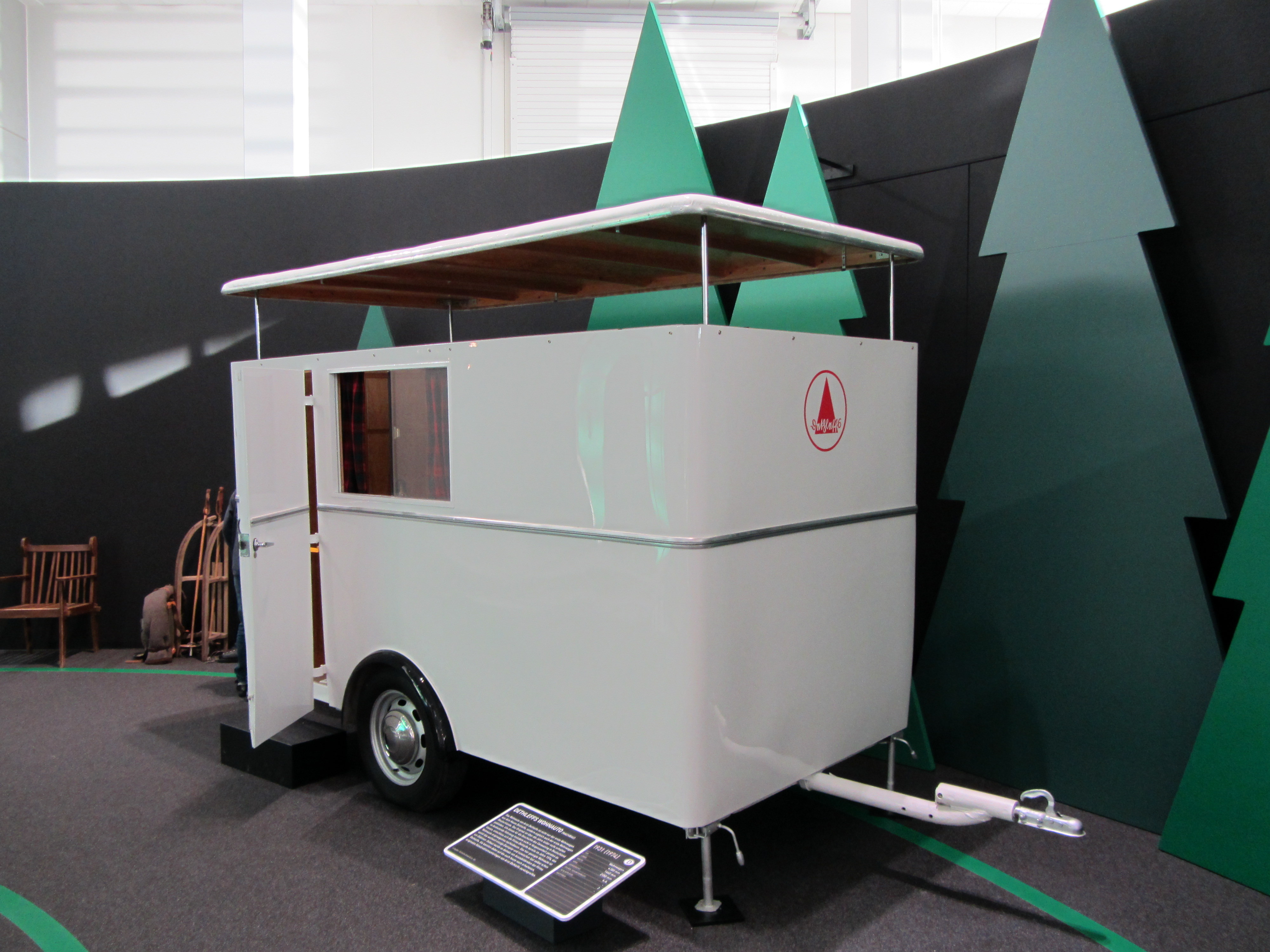
Dethleff's caravan from 1931, Germany's first caravan (replica from 1974) at Erwin Hymer Museum
