= Jayco =

American RV manufacturer

Jayco Inc.
- Type: Subsidiary
- Industry: recreation vehicles
- Founded: 1968
- Founders: Lloyd and Bertha Bontrager
- Headquarters: Middlebury, Indiana, USA
- Owner: Thor Industries
- Number of employees: 3,200
- Website: www.jayco.com

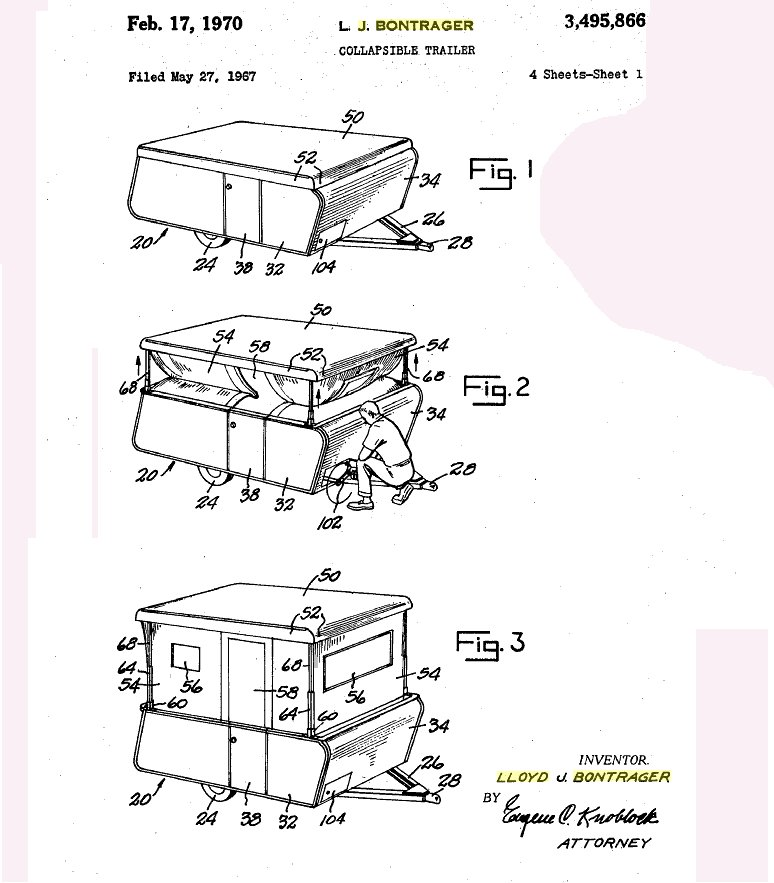
collapsible trailer patented by Lloyd Jay Bontrager 1967

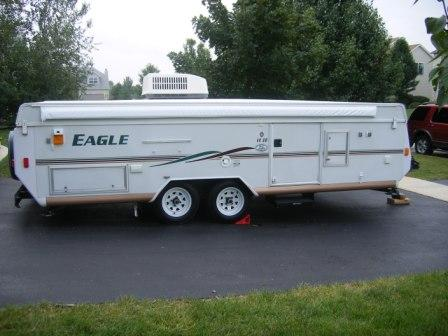
Jayco collapsible trailer 2004 model

Jayco RV is an American manufacturer of recreational vehicles. The company is based in Middlebury, Indiana, and about three-quarters of its 3,200-person workforce is from the Amish and Mennonite communities of Indiana.

== History ==
The company was founded in 1968 by Lloyd and Bertha Bontrager. Bontrager developed a trailer fold-down system in 1967 and started the business of making travel trailers from two chicken houses and a barn. In the first year of operations the company sold 132 trailers, and by the end of 1968 it had 15 employees. The company continued to grow and in 1970 built another plant in Harper, Kansas.

The company was hard hit in the energy crunch of the 1970s, and several of their plants were closed temporarily. In the late 1980s and early 1990s they also suffered another slowdown due to the high price of gasoline. The company recovered to become the second-largest U.S. manufacturer of towable products by 1995.

On Easter Sunday, 1985, Lloyd Bontrager was killed when his small airplane crashed in the vicinity of Muncie, Indiana. His wife, Bertha, became chairman of the board at Jayco, and later her sons Wilbur and Derald assumed leadership roles within the company.

Jayco was acquired by Thor Industries in July 2016 for $576 million.

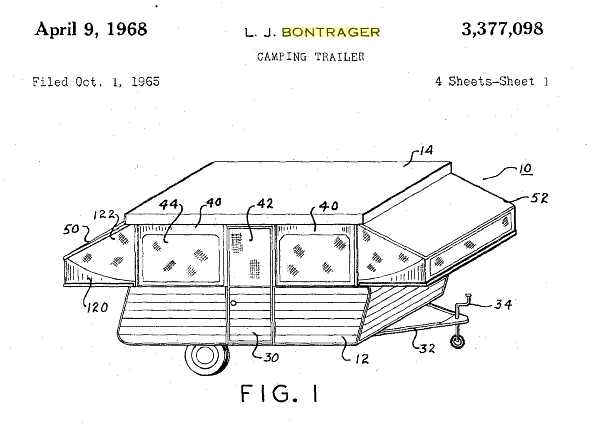
camping trailer patent
Lloyd Jay Bontrager 1965

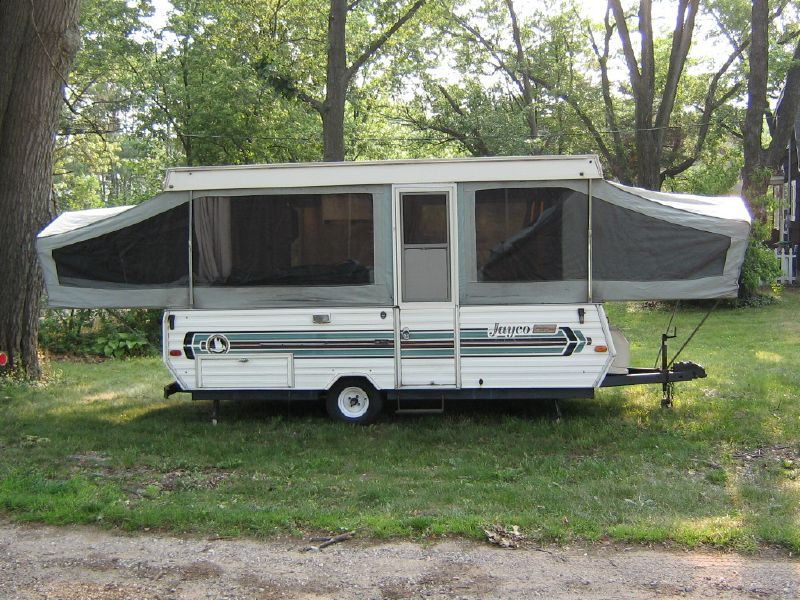
Jayco camping trailer 2006
"pop-up" model

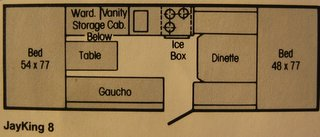
Jayco camping trailer
floor plan

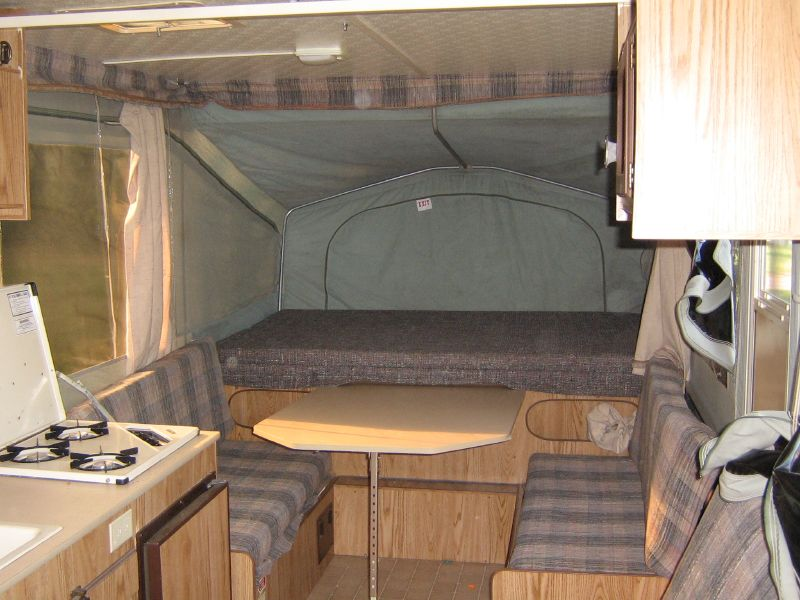
Jayco camping trailer
"pop-out" bedroom
