= Erwin Hymer =

German businessman

- Born: 27 July 1930; Bad Waldsee, Germany
- Died: 12 April 2013 (aged 82); Bad Waldsee
- Known for: Founder of Hymer

Erwin Hymer (27 July 1930 – 12 April 2013) was a German businessman, and the founder of the motorhome manufacturer Hymer. In 2000 he received Order of Merit of the Federal Republic of Germany.
