= Safari Trek Motorhome =

Line of motorhomes

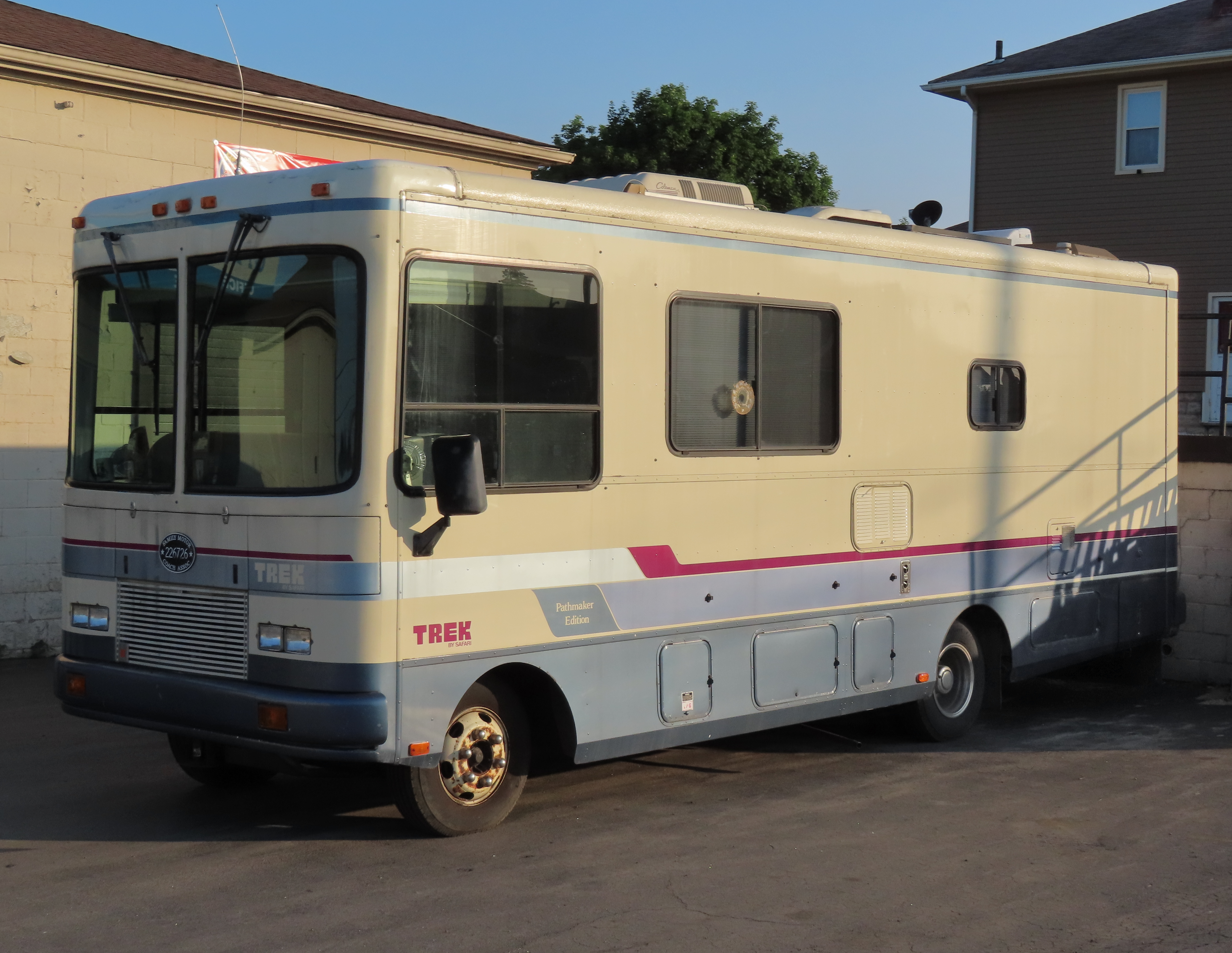
1992 Safari Trek Pathmaker Edition

The Safari Trek was a line of Motorhomes built by the Safari Motorcoach Corporation (SMC) based out of Harrisburg, Oregon. The Trek line was developed in the late 1980s with some early model prototypes. The first official model year began in 1991 and ended in 2001 under the Safari Motorcoach Corporation banner. In 2001 SMC was purchased by Monaco Coach who took over the production of subsequent model years. The early pre-Monaco Trek's now hold a venerated status among Safari RV enthusiasts-"Trekkies". This is in part due to the Trek's patented "Electro-Majic Bed" which provided for spacious floor plans. There was as well an exceptionally high build quality that used a riveted aluminum outer skin in lieu of the more popular tin or fiberglass, real hardwood cabinetry, and a small bus like design that made the Trek easy to drive and maneuver. In 2009 Monaco Coach filed for chapter 11 bankruptcy ending the "Safari Trek" line of motorhomes. The exact production numbers of the early pre-Monaco Treks have never been officially released, but estimated to be approximately 200 per year at peak production during the ten-year run. Much of this is derived from former employees and customers who took the factory tours that Safari Motorcoach Corporation would give to potential buyers. Since there is no official registry, it is difficult to know how many are still on the road today.

== History ==
Safari Motorcoach Corporation (SMC) and the Trek line of motorhomes was the brainchild of Mat Perlot, former marketing manager for Beaver Motorcoach Corporation. When Beaver Coach decided to pass on creating a Class A motorhome with a $80,000 to $120,000 price point, Mat Perlot along with Curt Lawler, also a Beaver Coach employee, left to create Safari Motorcoach Corporation. Legend has it that Mat Perlot felt there were many young drivers who wanted a smaller RV with the same quality of the larger, higher priced units. After studying some of the space saving features of the Class C coaches like the overhead bunk, Perlot conceived of a pull down mechanical bed which would be tucked away in the ceiling when not in use. They called it the "Electro-Majic Bed". This innovation in the Class A motorhome allowed for the elimination of a separate rear bedroom and opened up space in the living quarters while maintaining a small 24 foot length. The inaugural 1991 model year also came in a 28-foot model for those who wished to have a separate rear bedroom.

Although dealers were skeptical, Mat Perlot's intention was to build an RV for weekend use and priced for volume sales. There were various technical issues to make the Electro-Majic Bed work; however, through trial and error these were resolved with the 1991 model year which had an electric motor made by Somfy that was powerful enough to raise and lower the 250 pound bed. Once the dealers started supporting this new concept and market segment, something interesting happened once the Trek's started selling. Though designed for short term weekend use with its novel bed and small footprint, a surprising number of people started using the Trek full-time and for extended time periods. Trek ownership continued to grow and soon Trek clubs started to form. Owners were proud of the quality construction and the fact that they had a 24 or 28 foot model that felt more like a 30 or 35 foot coach. The Electro-Majic Bed had become so popular among consumers that it was also added to Safari's Kalahari line of motorhomes in 1993.

== Model Years ==
The 1991 Safari Trek was the first year of production which used the Isuzu NPR truck chassis. This was a 3.9 Liter turbocharged four cylinder diesel engine (4BD1T) with 126HP output mated to a four speed automatic Jatco transmission with overdrive. The Isuzu NPR provided 14mpg to 16mpg which was unheard of at the time for a Class A motorhome, though most owners realized more like 13 to 14 mpg. The Trek with the NPR chassis had a GVWR of 13,200 lbs with a 2,200 lbs payload. This model year came in both a 24-foot model (2400) and a 28-foot model (2830/2810) with all of the amenities known in a Class A such as shower, refrigerator, stove, microwave, sink, water heater. It had an onboard propane tank as well as generator. The electrical system was a 12 volt system with a 70 amp alternator and 1000 watt inverter.

The 1992 Safari Trek was again built on the NPR chassis with many of the same features except a 26-foot model was introduced (2600) which came with two twin beds in the rear. Both the 28 foot model (2810/2830) as well as the 26 foot model offered the Electro-Majic bed as an option as both already had rear sleeping quarters. It was during this model year that Safari also introduced the "Pathmaker Edition" trim line. The Pathmaker Edition came with a patio awning, hydraulic levelers, solar inverter, and air horn. Just as prior model year, options included roof rack and ladder. There was one new option that became near and dear to many Trek owners: The Dame murals painted on the rear of the coach. In keeping with the Safari name, the artistic Dame family was contracted to paint animal and nature themed murals which were one of a kind pieces of art.

The 1993/94 Safari Trek though still fabricated on the NPR chassis, had an engine upgrade with the introduction of the inter-cooled 4BD2Tc which boosted power to 135HP. The Electro-Majic Bed which was previously positioned to the front of the coach over the captain chairs, was now moved a few feet aft towards the living quarters. It is believed this move was made so that the television set which also doubled as a rear backup camera monitor could be moved front and center just over head of both driver and passenger. There was the continuation of the Pathmaker Edition and same floor plan configurations as before. The 1994 Safari Trek is essentially the same as the previous model year with the exception of new interior and exterior color schemes, an Onan generator now replaced the Generac, and RVA brand leveling jacks replaced the prior year's HWH leveling jack system.

The 1995 Safari Trek saw a complete changeover starting with the termination of the Isuzu chassis engine configuration. There is much speculation as to why the Isuzu chassis was ditched. Some believe that the engine was under-powered while others mentioned the cost vis-a-vis the dollar/yen exchange. Either way, the Trek was now utilizing a GM Chevrolet P30 chassis with a 454 V8 gas engine linked to a GM 4L80E transmission. Also available was a GM 6.5 liter turbo diesel. A very rare and limited number of Chevrolet P72 chassis rear engine diesel pushers were made coupled to an Allison Transmission. The P72 configuration came in coach lengths of 30 and 33 feet. Clearly there was a philosophical change with the Safari Trek as these larger coach lengths and widths were introduced. The new GM chassis were now 6 inches wider than the older 90 inch NPR wheelbase. There were now twice the number of floor plans being offered for a total of eight with more upgrades like dual-pane windows and remote controlled mirrors among other things. With the wider width end caps, widened radiator grill and contoured skirt doors, the Trek now had a more luxurious exterior look and interior feel.

The 1996/97 Safari Trek was a continuation of the prior 95 changeover with only minor refinements and exterior/interior color changes. By 1997, SMC was nine years into coach building and the Trek line had well established itself among dealers and consumers as a unique and well built motorhome. Although the longer Treks were now being offered, all of the advertising for the Trek line showed only the smaller 24 and 26 series coaches. The ad copy of this period highlighted the fact that these were smaller, more nimble motorhomes for hard to access campgrounds and narrow roads. SMC was obviously leading with the one feature that put the Trek on the map – its smaller footprint.

The 1998 Safari Trek saw a number of changes. Gone are all of the longer rear engine, rear bedroom floor plans. Going back to its roots, the Trek line is now trimmed down to two 24 series floor plans and one 28 series floor plan. The Trek is now exclusively using the Chevrolet P-32 chassis with an available 454 Vortec engine or the 6.5 liter GM Detroit Diesel. Both power plants use the Hydromatic 4L80E four speed transmission w/overdrive. Just as every model year has its improvements and refinements, the 98 offered a Datron mobile satellite system and a Delco GPS navigation system.

The 1999/2000 Safari Trek kept the same chassis specs, now labeled "workhorse" and floor plans as the prior year, yet there were some exterior changes made. The riveted aluminum skin that gave the Trek its rugged look now gave way to a very smooth laminated skin though still in aluminum. The new exterior colors and decorative paint designs also took on more of a bold yet fluid, floating ribbon look as if the motorhome was in motion. The Pathmaker Edition option package was still being offered as well as the ever popular Dame murals on the back of the coach. There was now a new "Designer" interior package with upgraded kitchen counter tops, inlaid carpet, pleated shades, and ultra-leather cab seats.

The 2001 Safari Trek was the last year of production before the Monaco Coach purchase. The exterior front cap was redesigned with a sloped nose affectionately called a "slopey" by its owners. Along with the new front cap, the Trek expounded on the prior year's exterior paint design giving the Trek a sporty in motion look. This model year's sales brochure emphasizes the new custom fabrics and luxury interior amenities available in the "Designer" package, however, the Trek still leads with it being a small size Class A coach as its greatest asset.

== The Monaco Coach Years ==
In July 2001, Monaco Coach purchases Safari Motorcoach in the mid-model year. Some believe that SMC had expanded too rapidly coupled with poor strategic decisions and acquisitions such as bankrupt Beaver Coach Corporation that soon led to SMC's own financial deterioration and distraction from their original success with the Trek line. Prior to the Monaco purchase, Safari Motorcoach had undergone re-organization and some cost cutting.

The first 2002 Monaco Coach Trek stayed true to the Trek concept. Apart from the exterior color and paint design, the 2002 Model year was essentially a carry-over from the prior 2001 model year using the Workhorse chassis, but with one additional floor plan in the 24 series. The usual improvements and refinements are seen in this new model year but the word "small" is quietly dropped in favor of "smart" in brochure copy. A "Trek Sport Coach" low-budget trim line is introduced with a reduced electrical service, single pane windows, vinyl wrapped cabinets, laminate tops, furnishing downgrades, and decal graphics instead of painted graphics.

The 2003 Model year is a very different motorhome and serves as the template for subsequent model years. The aerodynamic sloped nose front cap is gone and in its place is a more traditional squared front end for improved visibility and a few inches of extra space. The cockpit dashboard has a complete redesign, a splash of many new interior and exterior colors, a plethora of new options and floor plans, and the introduction of a Ford chassis for a 30-foot model. From a marketing and product perspective, the 2003 Trek is a radical departure from SMC's original roots as the "small coach with a big attitude" considering that three inches of external width was gained in this model year. The 2003 brochure copy again makes no mention of the Trek as being "small" as in years past and rightfully re-labels the 24 series to 26 which reflects the coach's actual 26 foot plus length.

Beyond the 2003 model year to the final 2008 Trek model year, the same path is taken in expanding options, layouts, and even the introduction of a slide. The Trek has now morphed into a luxurious motorhome with the only thing remaining from its early inception is the Electro-Majic Bed concept now called "HappiJac" and the Dame murals. Even the exterior aluminum skin that the early Treks were famous for has now been replaced with a gel-coat fiberglass exterior. The original Trek had the appeal of a lower price point for customers wishing to purchase a Class A recreational vehicle of a high-quality build. But by 2008 much of that appeal was gone and the Trek was competing with other manufacturers who had entered this affordable small Class A market and the growth of the Class B market segment as well. Only 35 production models were made of the 2008 Safari Trek and just two floor plans are shown in brochures.

Due to the Great Recession, Monaco Coach filed for chapter 11 bankruptcy in March 2009. Navistar International which by now owned the workhorse chassis upon which many recreational vehicles were being manufactured, purchased the Monaco Coach assets including the Trek brand. In 2013 Navistar sold off Monaco Coach to REV Group, formerly Allied Specialty Vehicles, who now retains the Trek Brand.

== Revival ==
The REV Group revived the Trek brand and legacy with a trekmotorhome.com website which was more of a low budget landing page. The revived Trek was in production for 2016 attempting to capture some of the lost magic considering that the brand has been shuttered since 2008. To purists, the new Trek was a far cry from its progenitor the Safari Trek, but the folks at the REV Group have put some thought into this new design. No longer called Electro-Majic Bed, a patent pending "Bed Lift Feature" is in the front of the coach as well as a rear queen bed that also lifts up to create a space they call "Trek Room". There is also an underneath storage area called "Trek Trunk" for camping gear. The new Trek came with two 28 foot floor plans and one 30 foot floor plan on a Ford chassis powered by a 6.8 Liter V10 Triton.
