= REV Group =

American vehicle manufacturer

REV Group, Inc.
- Formerly: Allied Specialty Vehicles
- Type: Public
- Traded as: NYSE: REVG; Russell 2000 Component
- Industry: Automotive
- Founded: 2010; 16 years ago
- Headquarters: Brookfield, Wisconsin, United States
- Key people: Mark Skonieczny
- Products: Ambulances, buses, firefighting vehicles, recreational vehicles
- Number of employees: 6,873
- Website: revgroup.com

REV Group is an American manufacturer of ambulances, buses, commercial vehicle, firefighting vehicles, recreational vehicles and other specialty vehicles, as well as aftermarket parts and services.

Founded in 2010 as Allied Specialty Vehicles, it provides vehicles and services for public fire departments and emergency services, as well as commercial infrastructure and leisure vehicles for consumers. REV encompasses 24 brands.

Going public in January 2017, it was listed on the New York Stock Exchange until February 2026, when it was announced that its merger with Terex had been completed.

== History ==
Allied Specialty Vehicles was formed in 2010 from the merger of four companies owned by American Industrial Partners: Collins Industries, E-ONE, Halcore Group, and Fleetwood Enterprises. Allied Specialty Vehicles changed its name to REV Group in November 2015 In January 2017, the company went public with ticker symbol REVG.

=== Acquisitions and divestitures ===
In September 2010, ASV acquired the assets of ambulance manufacturer Road Rescue from Spartan Motors. REV Group purchased SJC Industries from Thor Industries in May 2013. It is a manufacturer of ambulances under the brand names McCoy Miller and Marque. A week later, it was announced that ASV was purchasing the RV assets of Navistar International, which include Monaco, Holiday Rambler, R-Vision and the Beaver and Safari brands. In August 2013, ASV announced the purchase of Thor Industries' bus businesses, including the ElDorado Motor Corp., National Coach, Champion Bus, and Goshen Coach companies.

In April 2016, REV Group acquired fire truck manufacturer Kovatch Mobile Equipment Corp. Later that year, REV Group acquired Ferrara Fire Apparatus and Class C motorhome manufacturer Renegade RV. In April 2017, the company acquired sprinter van manufacturer Midwest Automotive Designs.

In January 2018, REV Group acquired California-based Lance Camper. Lance was founded in 1965 and manufactures truck campers and towable RVs. REV Group announced its acquisition of Spartan ER, a subsidiary of Spartan Motors, in February 2020. REV Group sold its shuttle bus brands Champion, Federal Coach, World Trans, Krystal Coach, ElDorado and Goshen Coach to Forest River in May 2020.

In January 2024, REV announced it would be exiting the bus manufacturing business. The company reached an agreement to sell its Collins school bus brand to Forest River for $303 million and later its ENC transit bus division to Rivaz Inc. in October for $52 million.

In July 2025, REV announced that it had sold Lance Camper Mfg. to Vision Kore Inc., effective Thursday, June 26, 2025.

In October 2025, REV announced its planned merger with Terex. The transaction was finalized in February of the following year.

In 2025, the firefighters' labour union, International Association of Fire Fighters requested the United States Department of Justice and Federal Trade Commission to probe the fire and emergency vehicle industry in the United States for anti-trust practices, where three companies: REV Group, Oshkosh Corporation, and Rosenbauer made up two-thirds of the market. 2026, various local administrations within United States such as Allentown in Pennsylvania, Los Angeles County and San Diego County in California, Portland in Oregon, and Huntsville, Alabama, had filed separate lawsuits against the company and other manufacturers alleging anti-trust and monopolistic behavior in the firetrucks market and leading to shortages and high prices. REV Group "cited demand, labor shortages and cost increases as driving price increases and delays".

== Corporate structure ==
REV Group has around 6,800 employees. Its CEO is Mark Skonieczny. 24 brands are part of REV Group's portfolio.

REV Group Brands
Company name	Location	Product lines
Fire Vehicle Brands
E-ONE	Ocala, Florida	Firefighting apparatus
Kovatch Mobile Equipment (KME)	Holden, Louisiana	Firefighting apparatus
Ferrara Fire Apparatus	Holden, Louisiana	Firefighting apparatus
Ladder Tower Company (LTC)	Ephrata, Pennsylvania	Ladder trucks
Smeal Fire Apparatus	Snyder, Nebraska	Firefighting apparatus
Spartan Emergency Response	Brandon, South Dakota	Firefighting apparatus
Spartan Fire Chassis	Charlotte, Michigan	Firefighting apparatus
Emergency Vehicle Brands
American Emergency Vehicles (AEV)	Jefferson, North Carolina	Ambulances (Type I, II, III)
Horton Ambulance	Grove City, Ohio	Ambulances (Type I, II, III)
Leader Emergency Vehicles	South El Monte, California	Ambulances (Type II, III)
Road Rescue	Winter Park, Florida	Ambulances (Type I, II, III)
Wheeled Coach	Winter Park, Florida	Ambulances (Type I, II, III)
Recreational Vehicle Brands
American Coach	Decatur, Indiana	Class A luxury motorhomes
Fleetwood Enterprises	Decatur, Indiana	Class A, motorhomes
Goldshield Fiberglass	Decatur, Indiana	Molded fiberglass manufacturing
Holiday Rambler	Decatur, Indiana	Class A motorhomes
Midwest Automotive Designs	Elkhart, Indiana	Class B motorhomes
Renegade RV	Bristol, Indiana	Luxury motorhomes

== Brands ==
=== Fire ===
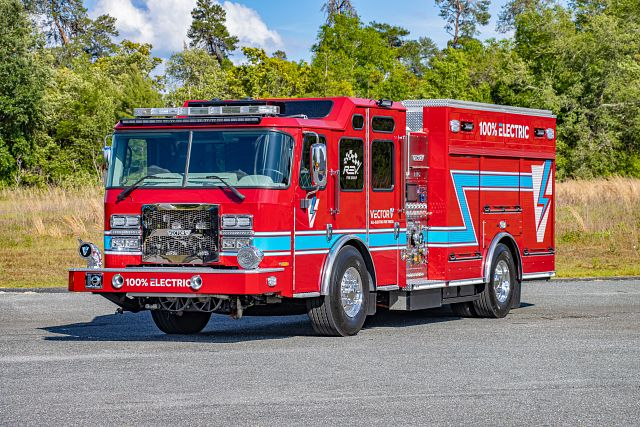
The E-ONE Vector is an all-electric fire truck.

REV Fire Group's Vector fire truck is the first full-electric North American fire truck. It has been ordered in Charlotte, North Carolina, Varennes, Quebec, and Mesa, Arizona, and Toronto, Canada, and was used in the 2023 Daytona 500.

==== E-ONE ====
E-ONE was acquired by REV Group's in 2010 as its first fire apparatus manufacturer and is headquartered in Ocala, Florida. According to Buffalo Business First, E-ONE manufactures "stainless steel fire trucks, mostly tankers and pumpers" and its customers include both volunteer and municipal fire departments. In November 2021, E-ONE was contracted by the city of Mesa, Arizona to build the first fully-electric firetruck in North America. As of February 2022, the company's Hamburg, New York plant employs around 100 people and produces around 90 trucks a year.

==== Kovatch Mobile Equipment ====
In April 2016, REV Group acquired Nesquehoning, Pennsylvania-based fire truck manufacturer Kovatch Mobile Equipment Corp (KME), which services municipal, state and federal governments. KME was founded in 1946; it began by producing aircraft refueling trucks before shifting into the fire truck market in the 1980s. REV Group announced that plants in Nesquehoning and Roanoke, Virginia would be closing in 2021, with KME production shifting to Holden, Louisiana. The Nesquehoning plant was closed in April 2022.

==== Ferrara Fire Apparatus ====
Ferrara Fire Apparatus was acquired by REV Group on April 25, 2017. The company manufactures custom fire and rescue vehicles for municipal and industrial clients. The company was founded in 1979 and employs around 450 workers as of 2017, with annual sales at $165 million. In November 2021, REV Group announced plans for a $7.46 million expansion of Ferrara's Holden, Louisiana manufacturing facility; the project is due to be complete in June 2023.

==== Spartan Emergency Response ====
In February 2020, REV Group announced its acquisition of Spartan ER, a subsidiary of The Shyft Group (at the time known as Spartan Motors), for $55 million. As part of the purchase, REV Group acquired Spartan Emergency Response and its subsidiaries (Spartan Fire Apparatus and Chassis, Smeal Fire Apparatus, Ladder Tower, and UST). The company designs, manufactures, and distributes custom emergency response vehicles across Asia, North America, and South America. Prior to its acquisition, Spartan recorded $253 million in revenue for the year ending in September 2019.

=== Ambulance ===
American Emergency Vehicles (AEV) is a manufacturer of ambulance vehicles. It was acquired by REV Group in 2010. and is headquartered in Jefferson, North Carolina, where it has been based for over 30 years. Leader Emergency Vehicles company develops ambulance vehicles, including all-electric vehicles, used by partners including DocGo, the first of their kind in the United States. REV Ambulance Group Orlando encompasses Wheeled Coach and Road Rescue. Horton Emergency Vehicles was founded by Carl Horton, who was an early leader in the IndyCar safety field; the company was founded in 1968 and is based in Grove City, Ohio. As of 2014, Horton employs around 400 workers and produces around 600 ambulances a year, primarily for fire departments. Horton vehicles produced after April 2023 feature the MBrace, a "four-point retractable harness that includes its own airbag" that can be deployed in a "fraction of a second."

=== REV Recreation Group, Inc. ===
REV Recreation Group comprises American Coach, Fleetwood Enterprises, Holiday Rambler, and Midwest Automotive Designs. In March 2023, REV completed its 40,000th unit at its Decatur, Indiana plant.

==== Renegade RV ====
Renegade RV was acquired by REV Group in 2016; as of December 2016, it had 175 employees and was based in Bristol, Indiana. The company manufactures recreational vehicles, trailers, and specialty vehicles.
