= Fleetwood Enterprises =

Producer of recreational vehicles (RVs)

Fleetwood RV
- Founded: 1950
- Founder: John C. Crean
- Headquarters: Decatur, Indiana (2009–present)
- Products: Recreational vehicles
- Parent: REV Group

Fleetwood RV is a producer of recreational vehicles (RVs). Founded in 1950, Fleetwood RV is part of REV Group. Rev's recreation division includes Fleetwood RV, American Coach, Monaco, Holiday Rambler, Renegade RV, Midwest Automotive Designs, and Lance Campers.

== History ==
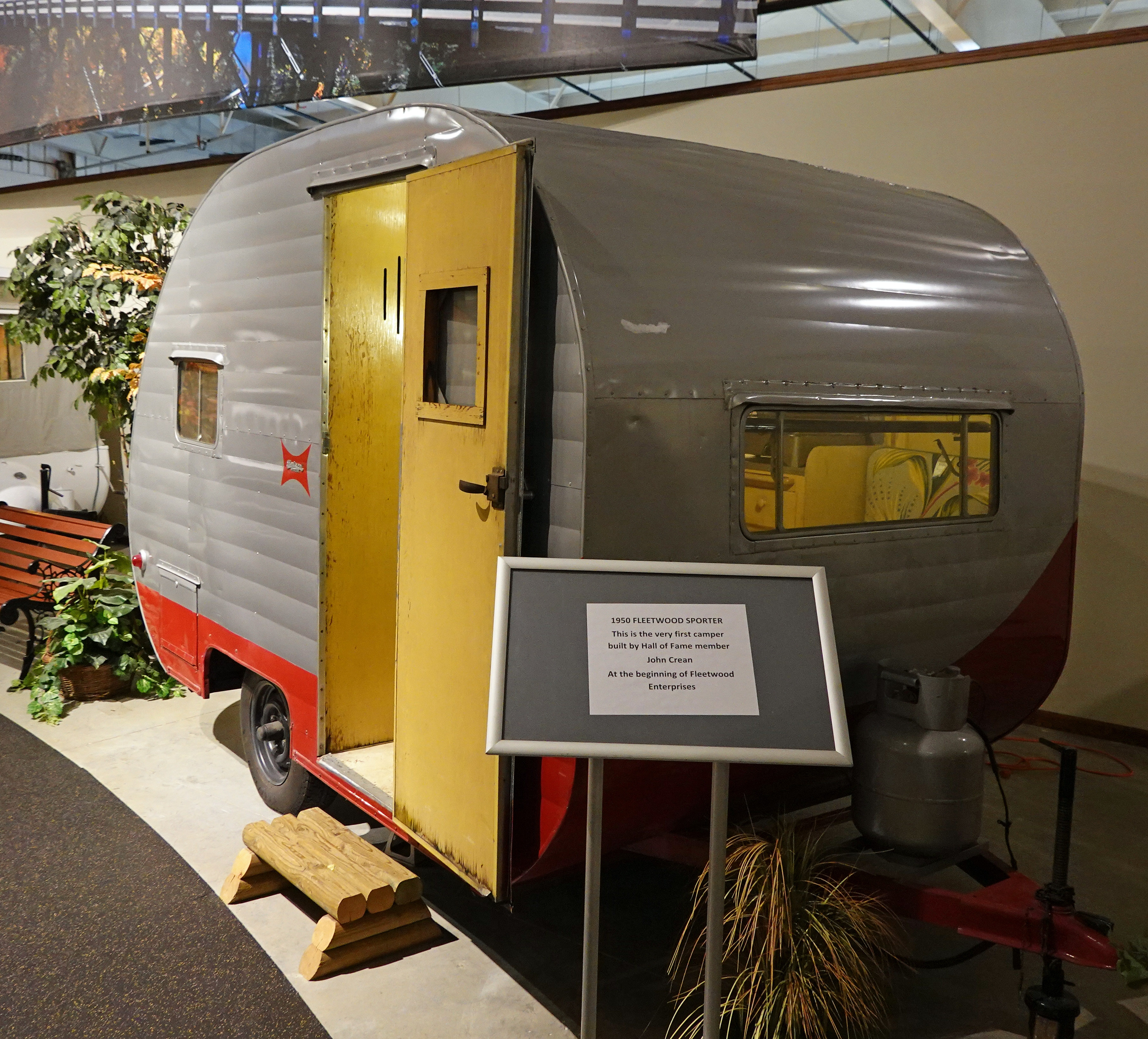
1950 Fleetwood Sporter trailer, displayed in the RV/MH Hall of Fame in Elkhart, Indiana.

Fleetwood RV's origins date back to 1950, when John C. Crean formed Coach Specialties Company in southern California, as a maker of window blinds for travel trailers. Around 1953, Crean renamed the company to Fleetwood Trailer Company, a name inspired by the automotive bodies incorporated into various Cadillac lines of automobiles. In 1957, the company was reincorporated as Fleetwood Enterprises, Inc.

During its first dozen years, the company moved from Compton to Paramount to Anaheim. It moved again in 1962 to Riverside, California. Fleetwood became a public company in 1965, reporting annual sales of $18.5 million. The company became part of the Fortune 500 in 1973, remaining there for nearly three decades. By 1989, Fleetwood RVs sales reached the one billion dollar milestone; five years later, it hit the same milestone in its sales of manufactured homes.

=== 21st century ===
In November 2008, Fleetwood Enterprises announced it was closing several factories across the United States. On March 10, 2009, the company filed for bankruptcy under Chapter 11 of the United States Code and announced the closing of its travel trailer division.

On July 17, 2009, the private equity firm American Industrial Partners ("AIP") acquired the motorized recreational vehicle assets from the company. The next month, Cavco Industries acquired the manufactured housing division. Fleetwood RV is now headquartered in Decatur, Indiana. In 2010, AIP combined Fleetwood with E-One, Collins Industries and Halcore Group to form Allied Specialty Vehicles. On February 2, 2010, Heartland Recreational Vehicles acquired the remaining active trademarks of the towable brands of Fleetwood Enterprises, Inc.
