= KME =

KME may refer to:

- Kaplan–Meier estimator, estimates the fraction of patients living for a certain amount of time after treatment.
- KME Smart, Iot platform, Turkish company.
- Kappa Mu Epsilon
- Kilmore East railway station, Australia
- KME Group, Italian company
- Kovatch Mobile Equipment Corp
- VEB Kombinat Mikroelektronik Erfurt, a conglomerate of microelectronic design and development facilities around the VEB Mikroelektronik "Karl Marx" Erfurt (MME) in the former East Germany
