= Ferrara Fire Apparatus =

American manufacturer of fire trucks and related equipment

- Founded: 1979
- Founder: Chris Ferrara
- Headquarters: Holden, Louisiana, USA
- Products: emergency services vehicles
- Website: http://www.ferrarafire.com/

Ferrara Fire Apparatus is an American manufacturer of heavy-duty emergency service equipment. The firm is based in Holden, Louisiana, and was founded by Chris Ferrara.

Ferrara offers a custom-design process that allows customer to influence how their truck is built. The manufacturing facility, with a floor area of nearly 300,000 square feet, was constructed by Firmin Construction Corporation.

In 2017, Ferrara Fire Apparatus became a wholly owned subsidiary after being acquired by the REV Group.

== Apparatus ==
Ferrara Fire Apparatus manufactures a wide variety of fire apparatus including the MVP Rescue Pumper, Custom Pumpers, Aerial Ladders, Aerial Platforms, Industrial Pumpers, Tankers, Rescue, and Wildland trucks.

Ferrara's new Inundator Super Pumper is recognized as the world's largest capacity NFPA-rated fire engine. This truck features a pump capable of delivering 5500 GPM from draft. This rate can increase to 10,000 GPM or more if the pump intake is connected to a pressurized source, such as a municipal water source.

== Custom Chassis ==
- Inferno
- Igniter
- Ultra
- Cinder

== Aerial Ladders ==
- HD-57
- HD-77
- HD-107
- HD-127
- HD-100 Mid Mount
- SHD-100
- FD-100
- LP-102

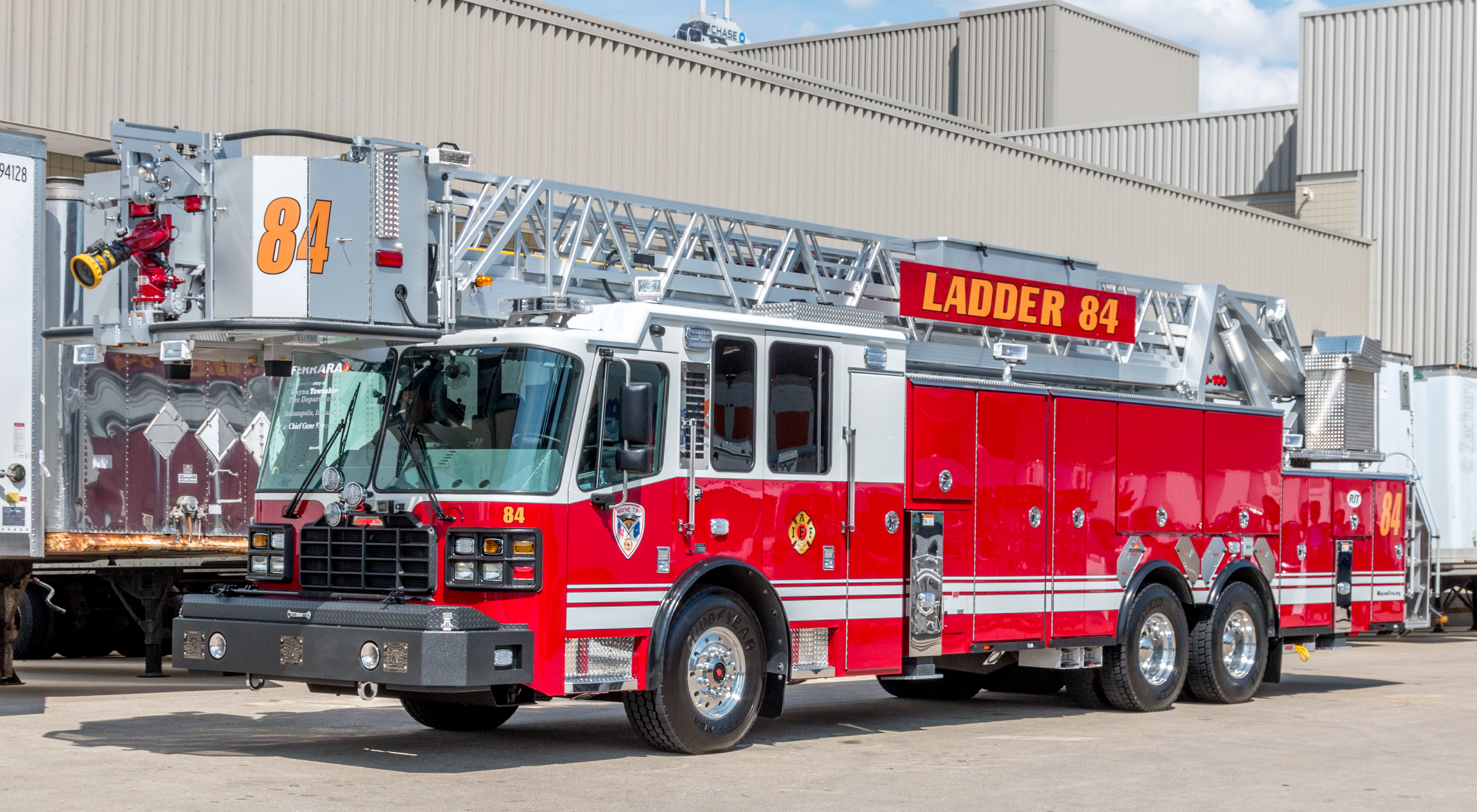
Wayne Township Fire Department - Indianapolis, Indiana

== Aerial Platforms ==
- HD-85 Mid Mount Platform
- HD-100 Mid Mount Platform
- HD-85 Rear Mount Platform
- HD-100 Rear Mount Platform
