= Beaver Motorcoach Corporation =

- Industry: Automotive
- Founded: ca. 1968
- Founder: Jim Hogue and Frank Storch
- Defunct: 2009
- Fate: Brand ceased to exist after bankruptcy
- Headquarters: Bend, Oregon (1965-2006); Coburg, Oregon (2006-2009)
- Products: Motorcoaches
- Parent: Safari Motorcoach Corporation (1994-2002); Monaco Coach (2002-2009)

Beaver Motorcoach Corporation (also known as Beaver Coach) is a defunct American motor coach manufacturing company that was based in Oregon. The company's manufacturing plant was initially located in Bend and later moved to Coburg. After its initial bankruptcy, the Beaver Coach brand name was purchased by a series of parent companies before it finally disappeared in 2009.

In 2016, the Beaver Brand and rights to build were purchased by Ty Kelly, owner of Beaver Coach Sales and Service, located on the grounds of the original Beaver Factory. They hope to begin manufacturing Beaver Coaches again.

== History ==
Beaver Motorcoach Corporation was founded in the late 1960s by Jim Hogue and Frank Storch. The company was named after the Oregon State University mascot. The firm originally built slide-in campers for pickup trucks.

Sometime around 1974, the company began building Class C motorhomes, commonly called "minis". The motor homes were built on a Chevrolet and Dodge chassis with either a Chevrolet 454 or Dodge 440 engine. In the mid-1970s, the company opened a motor coach repair facility in Bend.

In the early 1980s, the company began building Class A motorhomes with gas engines. Their product line ranged in size up to 36 feet (11 m) in length. During this period, all the Beaver Coach models used a brown and white color scheme. The company introduced its first diesel motor home in 1985. The following year, the company began producing coaches with a European-style rounded front end. They also introduced a new color pattern that featured red, green, and blue rainbow designs.

By 1990, the company employed 225 people at its Bend assembly plant. However, a decline in sales in the latter half of that year forced the company to furlough its employees for 30 days to allow demand to catch up with production.

During the early 1990s, Beaver Coach continued to employ 250 to 300 people despite growing financial problems. By November 1993, the company's debt exceeded $11 million and it was forced to file for Chapter 11 bankruptcy protection. While under the court's protection, Country Coach of Junction City, Oregon offered $6.9 million for the company. At the same time, Safari Motorcoach Corporation of Harrisburg, Oregon submitted a $7.6 million bid and eventually took ownership of Beaver Coach. Under the reorganization plan, Safari took over management of Beaver Coach. As part of the plan, unsecured creditors received less than 50 cents on the dollar.

Monaco Coach purchased Safari in 2002. The Beaver Coach brand name passed to Monaco as part of the deal. After acquiring the Beaver Coach brand rights, Monaco began producing a new line of luxury coach called the Beaver Solitaire. In 2006, Monaco moved its Beaver Coach assembly plant to Coburg, Oregon. During this period, several models that were not selling well were eliminated from the Beaver Coach product line.

In 2009, Monaco filed for Chapter 11 bankruptcy. The following year, Navistar International purchased Monaco. However, Navistar decided not to purchase the Beaver Coach brand name. No, the name passed through to Allied (REV Group).

As a result, the Beaver Coach brand disappeared from the market at that time. Also at about this time two Beaver Contessas were on the production line in Coburg, after Navistar finally completed the purchase of Monaco Coach they completed these Contessas on the production line, They were labeled as the 2010 model year. The two Contessas were sent up to Canada to be sold but they did not sell there. The two Contessas ended up for sale at Beaver Coach Sales Of Bend (former lot of Beaver Coach facility), the two Contessas are no longer for sale the assumption is that the two coaches have been sold. Early in 2016 the brand name was purchased from REV Group by the owner of Beaver Coach Sales and Service in Bend, OR, returning the brand to its roots. The hope is to one day begin manufacturing Beaver Coaches and restore them to their former glory.

== Beaver Ambassador Club ==
The Beaver Ambassador Club is an international motor home organization for owners of Beaver Coach motor homes. The club is affiliated with the Family Motor Coach Association. Each year, the organization sponsors approximately 30 rallies for its members. The first club rally was held in Bend in September 1983. As of 2014, there are approximately 1,000 club members from the United States, and Canada.
