= DocGo =

- Predecessor: Ambulnz
- Founded: 2015
- Key people: Lee Bienstock (CEO); Stephen Klasko (Board Chairman)
- Website: docgo.com

DocGo is a mobile healthcare company founded in 2015 as Ambulnz, and is now traded on the NASDAQ. The company specializes in mobile health services and medical transportation.

== History ==
DocGo was formed in November 2021 through the merger of predecessor firm Ambulnz and Motion Acquisition Corp, resulting in its listing on the NASDAQ under the ticker symbol DCGO. Ambulnz was itself founded in 2015, and over time grew to operate in 28 states, with partnerships with NYC H+H, Jefferson Health, and UCHealth. They also provided mobile healthcare services to clients such as the NFL and HBO. Services were provided by a staff of licensed/certified EMTs, paramedics and licensed practical nurses. The CEO of the company is Lee Bienstock. The company’s annual revenue grew from approximately $11 million in 2016 to $440 million by 2022. In July 2023, DocGo entered agreements with U.S. payers EmblemHealth and Blue Cross Blue Shield of Tennessee adding to existing agreements with UnitedHealthcare, Aetna in New York and New Jersey, Elevance Health, Cigna, and L.A. Care.

== Services ==
The company provides mobile health services, such as in-home care, and non-emergency medical transportation, in order to bridge telemedicine with in-person care. Ambulnz remains a subsidiary of the company, providing patient transportation services in both the US and the UK. In 2021, DocGo created a no-cost mobile influenza and COVID testing fleet in NYC. DocGo was also heavily involved in the mobile COVID-testing infrastructure set up across the United States, but began to transition to other areas as the pandemic came further under control, such as remote patient monitoring. For example, in 2022 DocGo launched the first ever all-electric ambulance in the US, servicing New York City.

In 2023, the company was awarded a $432 million no-bid contract to provide housing and services for migrants in New York City and in upstate New York, a contract that ended the following year. In late 2023, then President and COO Lee Bienstock was appointed CEO, succeeding Anthony Capone, who had resigned following revelations in the Times Union that he had misrepresented his academic credentials. In April of 2023, DocGo partnered with Fresenius Medical Care to include remote patient monitoring, chronic care management, and urgent care within its services.

DocGo’s pilot partnership with Dollar General, which saw mobile health clinics posted in the chain’s store parking lots beginning in 2023, came to a close in 2024. In 2024 DocGo also partnered with Spect to use portable retinal cameras for conducting vision exams, including diabetic retinopathy screenings. That year Stephen Klasko became chairman of DocGo’s board. In 2025 DocGo acquired PTI Health, a mobile lab collection service. In March 2025, the company laid off 360 employees from five New York City hotels and commercial buildings used for the city's emergency shelter programs, as it exited the migrant care space. As DocGo’s government contracts concluded, the company shifted its focus to agreements with insurers, healthcare providers, and transportation service partners.
