= Stephen K. Klasko =

American author (born 1963)

- Born: December 23, 1953 (age 72); Philadelphia, U.S.
- Education: Wharton School. Lehigh University
- Occupation: Author
- Writing career
- Notable works: UnHealthcare: A Manifesto for Health Assurance, 2020
- Notable awards: "Most Influential in Healthcare, Modern Healthcare Tied for #2, 2018."

Stephen Kent Klasko (born 23 December 1953) is an American author and leader of healthcare reform. He is currently Chief Executive Officer of the Healthssurance Foundation, a legally independent non-profit founded by Hemant Taneja of General Catalyst. Taneja and Klasko co-wrote and published the book UnHealthcare in 2020, articulating the core idea of "health assurance"

Between 2013 and 2021, he was the President and Chief Executive Officer of Thomas Jefferson University and Jefferson Health, a hospital system in the Greater Philadelphia region and home of the Sidney Kimmel Medical College. He expanded Jefferson Health into a regional health network with mergers from the original three hospitals to 18.

In 2017, he was named to Modern Healthcare's Top 100 Most Influential Individuals. Becker's Hospital Review named him among the top physician leaders to know.

== Early life and education ==
Born in Philadelphia, Klasko received his Bachelor's of Science in Chemistry and Biology from Lehigh University in Bethlehem, Pennsylvania, 1974. He earned his MD from Hahnemann University, Philadelphia, 1978. As a practicing obstetrician and gynecologist, he earned an MBA from the Wharton Executive Program of the University of Pennsylvania, Philadelphia, 1996.

Klasko began his practice of obstetrics and gynecology in Allentown, and was chairman and residency director at Lehigh Valley Hospital. He served as professor of obstetrics and gynecology at Penn State University Hershey Medical Center, as well as Drexel University and the University of South Florida.

== Career ==
Klasko was founding president in 1994 of "Spirit of Women," a program now spanning 120 hospitals to develop protocols to help hospitals succeed in meeting the needs of women patients.

Klasko was dean of the Morsani College of Medicine and Senior Vice President for the USF Health at the University of South Florida, 2004–2013. He was dean of the Drexel University College of Medicine and CEO of the Drexel University Physicians, 2000–2004.

Klasko was co-investigator of "Bringing Science Home", a $6-million, five-year grant from the Patterson Foundation to improve research and care for people living with chronic illnesses.

At USF Health, Klasko launched the $6million PaperFree Florida program, supported by the largest federal award to a non-hospital organization to use "health care ambassadors" to prepare private physician offices for electronic prescribing and records.

Klasko founded CAMLS, the largest building at the time dedicated to simulation and team training in health care, located in downtown Tampa.

Klasko launched one of the largest surveys in the United States of successful aging, through a partnership with The Villages, a retirement community in Florida, aimed at creating "America's Healthiest Home Town."

He is author of the 2016 book We CAN Fix Healthcare, The Future is Now and Editor in Chief of the peer-reviewed journal Healthcare Transformation.

In 2018, he published Bless This Mess: A Picture Story of Healthcare in America, using illustrations to describe the U.S. healthcare system, and decisions that could transform it.

In 2020, he published the book UnHealthcare: A Manifesto for Health Assurance, with Hemant Taneja and Kevin Maney, a call for a personalized data-driven system that assures health and addresses inequities. ISBN 978-1-716-99651-1

Klasko is author of The Phantom Stethoscope: A Field Guide for an Optimistic Future in Medicine, a science fiction book exploring the ethics and emotional intelligence needed for the future of medical education.
