= Holiday Rambler =

American manufacturer of recreational vehicles

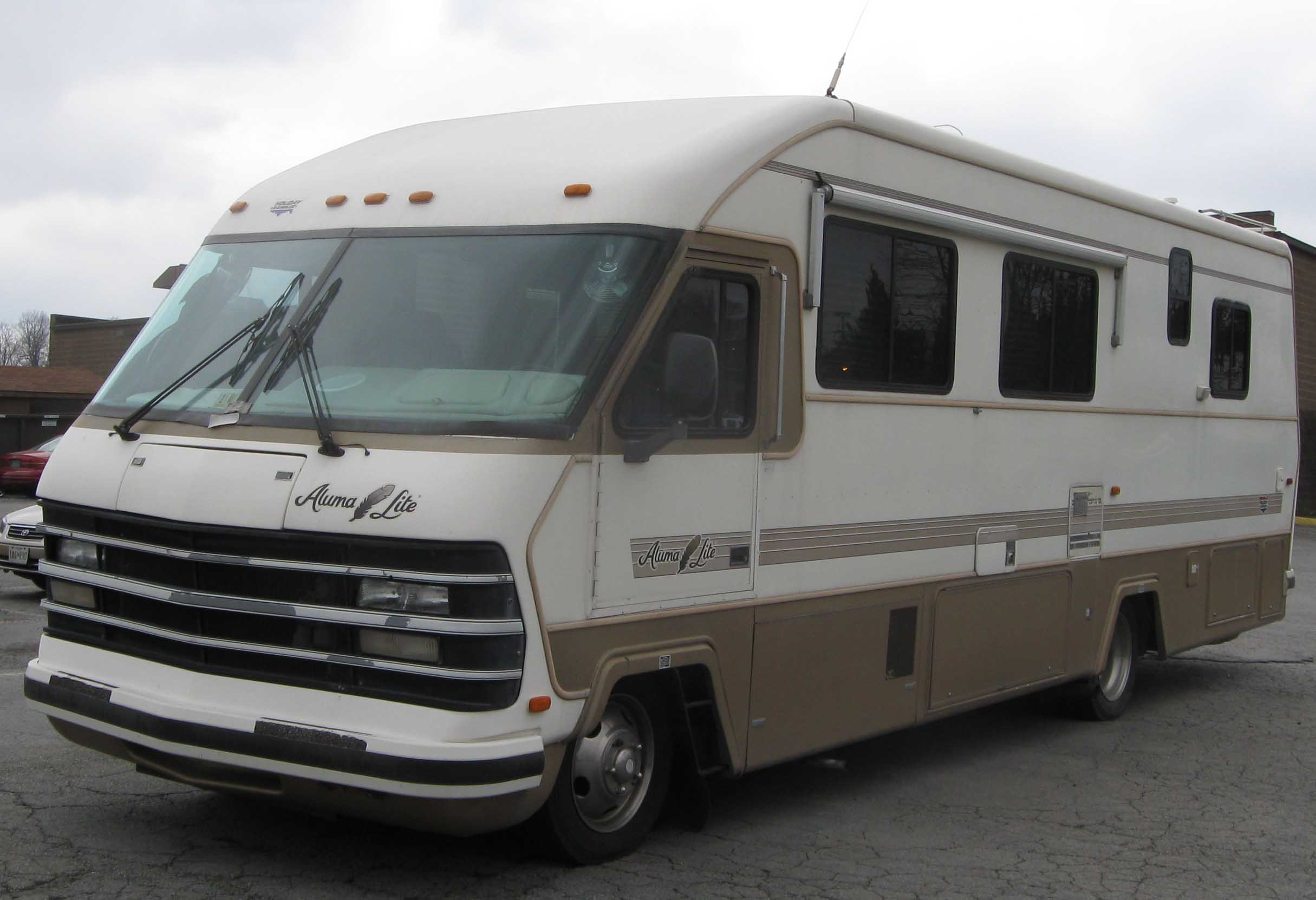
- Type: Subsidiary
- Industry: automobile manufacturing
- Founded: 1953
- Headquarters: Coburg, Oregon; United States
- Key people: Kay L. Toolson, Chairman & CEO; John W. Nepute, President
- Products: recreational vehicles, RV chassis
- Revenue: $202 million USD (FY 1992)
- Parent: REV Group
- Website: www.holidayrambler.com

Holiday Rambler Corporation is an American corporation which primarily manufactures recreational vehicles. It was founded in 1953. In 1961, Holiday Rambler's introduction of aluminum body framing ushered in a new era of lighter, stronger and more durable recreational vehicles (RVs). This aluminum frame (Alumaframe) became the standard for lighter and stronger RVs for 40 years. Holiday Rambler was also responsible for many firsts; built-in refrigerators, holding tanks and aerodynamic radiused corners. As Holiday Rambler moved into motorhomes, they were the first with tag axles and the kitchen slide-out revolutionized "interior engineering" in the field. Holiday Rambler was sold to Harley-Davidson in 1986 and later in 1996 to the Monaco Coach Corporation where its future, then under Navistar International Corp., was difficult in 2010 as it was for most motorhome manufacturers.

In May 2013, Holiday Rambler was sold by Navistar International Corp. to Allied Specialty Vehicles.

== History ==
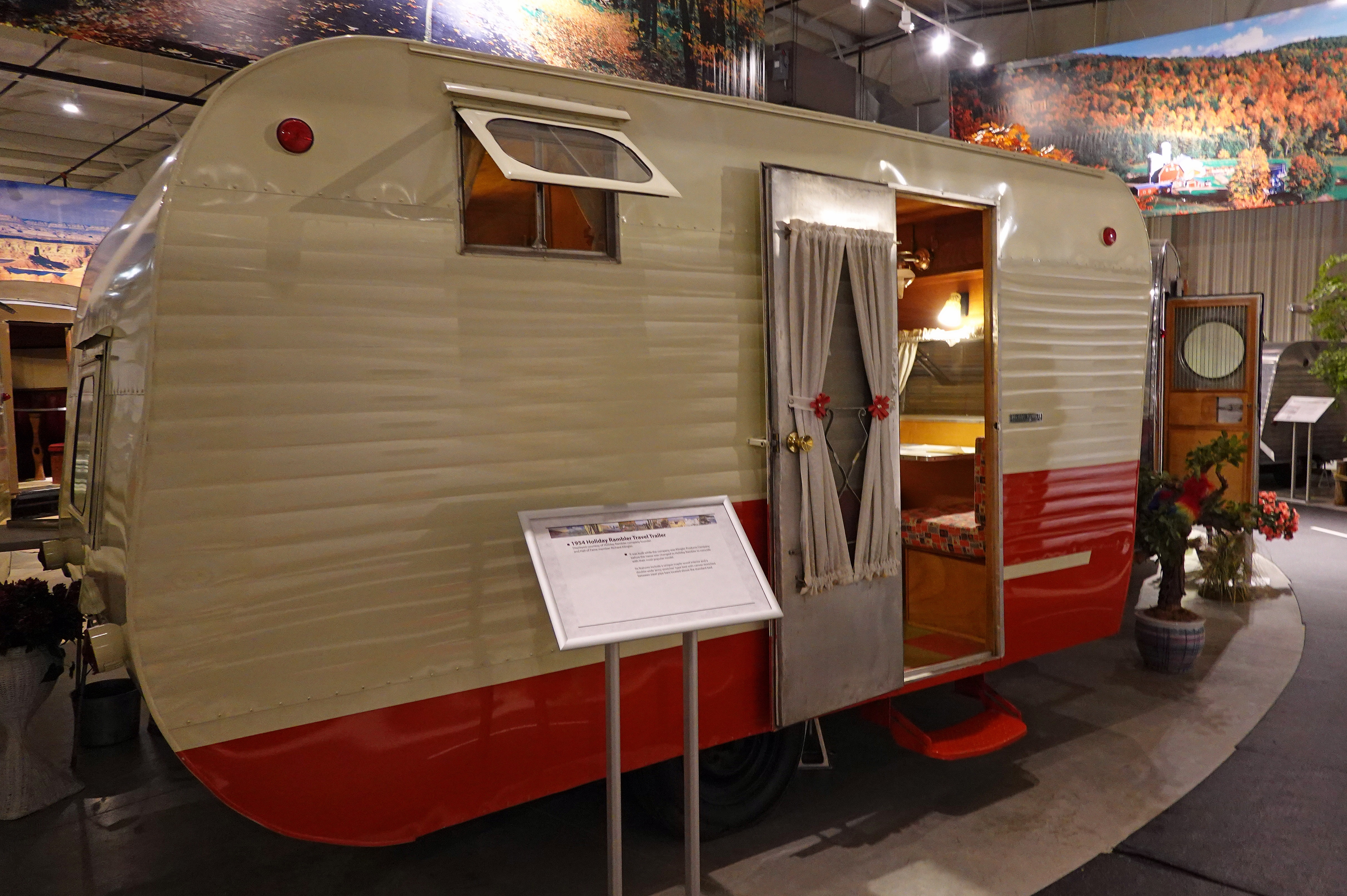
1954 Holiday Rambler Travel Trailer, displayed in the RV/MH Hall of Fame in Elkhart, Indiana.

Company founder Richard Klingler started building trailer parts in a chicken coop and assembling the trailers outdoors in the 1950s in Wakarusa, Indiana. The Elkhart and Wakarusa (ten miles (16 km) south of Elkhart) area of Indiana became the recreational vehicle (then called "campers") capital of the US after World War II. The first Holiday Rambler recreational vehicle was a travel trailer introduced to the public in 1953 by the Klingler Corporation. A fully restored example is in the RV museum in Elkhart, Indiana. There is a watercolor painting of it by artist Paige Bridges.

Holiday Rambler Corporation and its subsidiaries ("Holiday Rambler") was acquired by the Harley-Davidson, Inc. in December 1986. Holiday Rambler's Recreational Vehicle division competed primarily in the mid to premium segment of the recreational vehicle market.

On March 4, 1996, the Monaco Coach Corporation of Oregon acquired from Harley-Davidson, Inc. certain assets of Holiday Rambler (the "Holiday Acquisition") in exchange for $21.5 million in cash, 65,217 shares of Redeemable Preferred Stock (which was subsequently converted into 230,767 shares of Common Stock), and the assumption of most of the liabilities of Holiday Rambler. Concurrently, the company acquired ten Holiday World Dealerships for $13.0 million, including a $12.0 million subordinated.

On June 23, 2009, Judge Kevin Carey agreed to the Monaco Coach Corporation's request to convert its Chapter 11 bankruptcy filing to a Chapter 7 case so it could liquidate its remaining assets. The order converting the case to Chapter 7 was effective June 30. Monaco Coach Corporation sold its factories, inventory, brands and intellectual property to Navistar International Corp. earlier in June for $47 million. Once the remaining assets were liquidated under Chapter 7, "the entity ceases to exist," and effectively spelled the end of Monaco Coach Corporation. On August 16, 2024, the founder of Holiday Rambler, Richard Klinger, died at 97.

== Models ==
Holiday Rambler manufactures motorhomes, which travel on their own power, and towables, which are designed to be pulled by a motor vehicle. All of these recreational vehicles have toilets and facilities for cooking and sleeping.

Motorhomes can be quite large and expensive. The Navigator prices start at US$495,000 Manufacturer's Suggested Retail Price (MSRP). The Navigator is a Class A motorhome.

=== Class A Motorhomes ===
- Traveler
- Navigator
- Imperial
- Scepter
- Endeavor
- Ambassador
- Neptune
- Vacationer
- Admiral
- Arista
- Aluma-Lite
- Trip
- Limited
- Invicta
- Armada

A Class A motor home has a large frame similar to that of a bus, but is built on its own specialized chassis. These large Holiday Rambler motorhomes can be 45 feet (14 m) long and 12 and 1/2 feet high. They can carry as much as 100 US gallons (380 L) of water and 100 US gallons (380 L) of diesel fuel. When fully loaded, these vehicles can weigh as much as 50,000 pounds.

=== Class B Motorhomes ===
- Augusta B+

A Class B motorhome is usually built on a cargo van chassis. These Holiday Rambler vehicles can carry as much as 35 US gallons (130 L) of water and 57 US gallons (220 L) of gasoline. When fully loaded, these vehicles can weigh as much as 20,000 pounds.

=== Class C Motorhomes ===
- Atlantis
- Aluma-Lite
- Presidential
- Traveler 24 (Built on Mercedes Sprinter chassis with 3l diesel engine)

A Class C motorhome is usually built on a modified truck chassis. These Holiday Rambler vehicles can carry as much as 29 US gallons (110 L) of water and 57 US gallons (220 L) of gasoline. When fully loaded, these vehicles can weigh as much as 14,000 pounds.

=== Fifth Wheel ===
- Presidential Suite
- Presidential
- Imperial
- Alumascape Suite
- Aluma-Lite
- Alumascape
- Next Level
- Savoy LX FW
- Savoy LE FW

Fifth Wheel towables are trailers that are designed to connect to the towing vehicle between the front and rear axles. Usually these are towed by pickup trucks and the fifth wheel receiver is placed in the bed of the truck. These Holiday Rambler towables can carry as much as 70 US gallons (260 L) of water. When fully loaded, these vehicles can weigh as much as 17,000 pounds.

=== Bumper Pull Travel Trailer ===
- Savoy LX TT
- Savoy LE TT
- Mintaro
- Black Diamond
- Campmaster
- Aluma-Lite
- Alumascape
- Presidential
- Rambler
- Traveler
- Statesman
- Monitor
- Vacationer
- Ramblette

Bumper Pull towables are designed to attach to the towing vehicle behind the rear axle on the bumper or on a receiver that is attached to the frame. These Holiday Rambler towables can carry as much as 50 US gallons (190 L) of water. When fully loaded, these vehicles can weigh as much as 10,000 pounds. These towables start at US$20,000 Manufacturer's Suggested Retail Price (MSRP).

== See also ==
- List of companies based in Oregon
- REV Group
