= Safari Motorcoach Corporation =

- Industry: Automotive
- Founded: 1986
- Founder: Matt Perlot and Curt Lawler
- Defunct: 2009
- Fate: Brand Closed Along With Beaver
- Headquarters: Harrisburg, Oregon (1986 - 2009),
- Products: Motorcoaches
- Parent: Monaco Coach (2002-2009)

Safari Motorcoach Corporation (also known as Safari Coach) is a defunct American motor coach manufacturing company that was based in Oregon. The company's manufacturing plant was initially located in Harrisburg. The Safari Coach brand name was purchased by Monaco in 2002, however the Safari Coach name was no longer being used as of 2009.

== History ==
Safari was founded in the 1980s by Mat Perlot and Curt Lawler, former employees of Beaver Motorcoach Corporation. The company started building diesel- and gas-powered Class A motorhomes. Safari bought Beaver in 1994 for $7.6 million after outbidding Country Coach. In 2002, Monaco Coach purchased Safari and Beaver brand names. In 2006 Beaver moved its assembly plant. Safari h was able to keep its plant in Harrisburg open. Safari also shared ownership in Beaver's Bend assembly plant. In 2006 the Beaver plant moved and Safari had to vacate.

== Bankruptcy And Closure Of Brand ==
In 2009, Monaco filed for Chapter 11 bankruptcy. The following year Navistar International purchased Monaco, but Navistar did not purchase the Safari Coach brand name, the Safari and Beaver brand names were no longer used.
