= Kovatch Mobile Equipment Corp =

American truck manufacturer

Kovatch Mobile Equipment Corp, better known as KME, is a custom truck manufacturer formerly based in Nesquehoning, Pennsylvania. KME is a subsidiary of the REV Group. KME specializes in automotive, aviation, petro-chemical, industrial, energy, military, police, and fire-rescue vehicles. Founded in 1946 by John "Sonny" Kovatch, Jr., KME has produced over 10,000 vehicles. In 2022 REV Group closed the Nesquehoning factory with any production of KME branded equipment being shifted to other REV Group facilities.

== Fire Apparatus ==
KME manufactures custom fire apparatus on their own chassis, including the Predator and Panther Chassis.

KME also modifies Pre-existing chassis, including:

- Mack
- Ford
- Pierce
- International
- Kenworth
