= Holden, Louisiana =

Unincorporated community in Louisiana, U.S.

Coordinates: 30°30′16″N 90°40′09″W

Holden is an unincorporated community located on U.S. Highway 190 between Albany and Livingston in Livingston Parish, Louisiana, United States. Holden is in a section of land awarded to Micajah "Cage" Spiller by a Spanish land grant. LA Hwy 441 which runs through Holden in a northwest–southeast direction is the road that connected Springfield with Baton Rouge to the west and points in Mississippi to the east. In 1907, the east–west line of the Baton Rouge, Hammond & Eastern Railroad was constructed.

When the railroad purchased land through the area that would later become Holden, one of the people selling rights-of-way was an early settler named James Mahlon Holden.

Another person who contributed to the economic growth of the area was James "Jim" F. McCarroll, who had the town surveyed into lots. Owner of the McCarroll Lumber Co., he established a sawmill about 1909 and contracted with the railroad for a spur track to his mill south of the railroad on the east bank of the Tickfaw River.

Sinclair Cooper constructed the spur, and the spur and the community became known as Cooper's Spur. Some residents were not happy with the name because Cooper was not a native of the area. When the Coopers later moved away the locals asked for the name to be changed to Holden to honor James Mahlon Holden.

On October 17, 1916, representatives of the railroad and Holden citizens, McCarroll, Drumwright, and Sharp met with the Louisiana Railroad Commission to plan a Holden depot.

The Holden post office was established on December 8, 1909, with Bunyan Drumwright as postmaster. The ZIP Code for Holden is 70744.

== Education ==
Area students attend Holden School, a PreK-12 campus that is part of the Livingston Parish Public School system. The school has approximately 705 students and its mascots are the Rockets and Lady Rockets.

The Mighty Rockets Basketball team won the Louisiana Class C State Championship in 1963.

The Lady Rockets Basketball team won the Louisiana Class C State Championship in 1972 and has won the Louisiana Class B State Championship in 1996, 1997, 2006, 2016, and 2018.

Holden's first known State Championship was in 1937 in basketball. It was taken away from the school that same year when an ineligibility was discovered on the championship team. Population as of 2007: 6,268 Median Home Cost: $213,500 Sales Tax Rate: 8% Income Tax Rate: 4%

Holden is rated in the top 5 scores in the Iowa, I-leap, and Leap.

Dukes of Hazzard star John Schneider, now a resident of Louisiana, has opened his John Schneider Studios in Holden.
