= Monaco Coach Corporation =

Recreational vehicle (RV) brand

Monaco Coach
- Type: Public
- Traded as: REVG
- Industry: Recreation vehicle manufacturing
- Founded: 1968
- Headquarters: Decatur, Indiana- Manufacturing, Parts, & East Coast Service Center & Subsidiary Grounds; Coburg, Oregon - West Coast Factory Service Center; United States
- Key people: Mike Snell, President of Monaco and Holiday Rambler; Jim Jacobs, President of Allied Recreation Group
- Products: Recreational vehicles, RV chassis
- Parent: REV Group
- Website: www.monacocoach.com

Monaco is a recreational vehicle (RV) brand, manufactured in Decatur, Indiana, and wholly owned by REV Recreation Group. Monaco holds a portfolio of Class A diesel motorhomes. REV Recreation Group is a subsidiary of REV Group.

Allied Recreation Group was established in 2013 following the acquisition of Monaco and Holiday Rambler. Allied Recreation Group is one of the manufacturers of Class A gas, Class A diesel, and Class C gas products for Fleetwood RV, American Coach, Holiday Rambler, Monaco, and Trek. The company maintains manufacturing operations, including a service center in Decatur, Indiana, and Coburg, Oregon; and a parts store. The name was changed to REV Group in 2015.

Monaco Coach continues as a division of REV.

== History ==
Monaco was incorporated in 1968 as the Caribou Manufacturing Company by Ray Mehaffey. They began building pickup campers. The most popular line was named "Monaco." In 1977 the name was changed to Monaco Coach Corporation. It acquired the Roadmaster Chassis Division of Chrysler Corporation in 1984 and the Holiday Rambler Division of Harley-Davidson in 1996. In 1987 Kay Toolson was appointed company president. Monaco manufactured seven brands of motorhomes and RVs, including Monaco, Beaver Motorcoach Corporation, Safari Motorcoach Corporation, McKenzie, Holiday Rambler, R-Vision, and Roadmaster Chassis. In 1994 Monaco president Kay Toolson announced they would move their Junction City operations to the Coburg Industrial Park in Eugene, Oregon.

On March 4, 1996, the Monaco Coach Corporation acquired from Harley-Davidson, Inc. certain assets of Holiday Rambler (the "Holiday Acquisition") in exchange for $21.5 million in cash, 65,217 shares of redeemable preferred stock (which was subsequently converted into 230,767 shares of common stock), and the assumption of most of the liabilities of Holiday Rambler. Concurrently, the company acquired ten Holiday World dealerships for $13.0 million, including a $12.0 million subordinated.

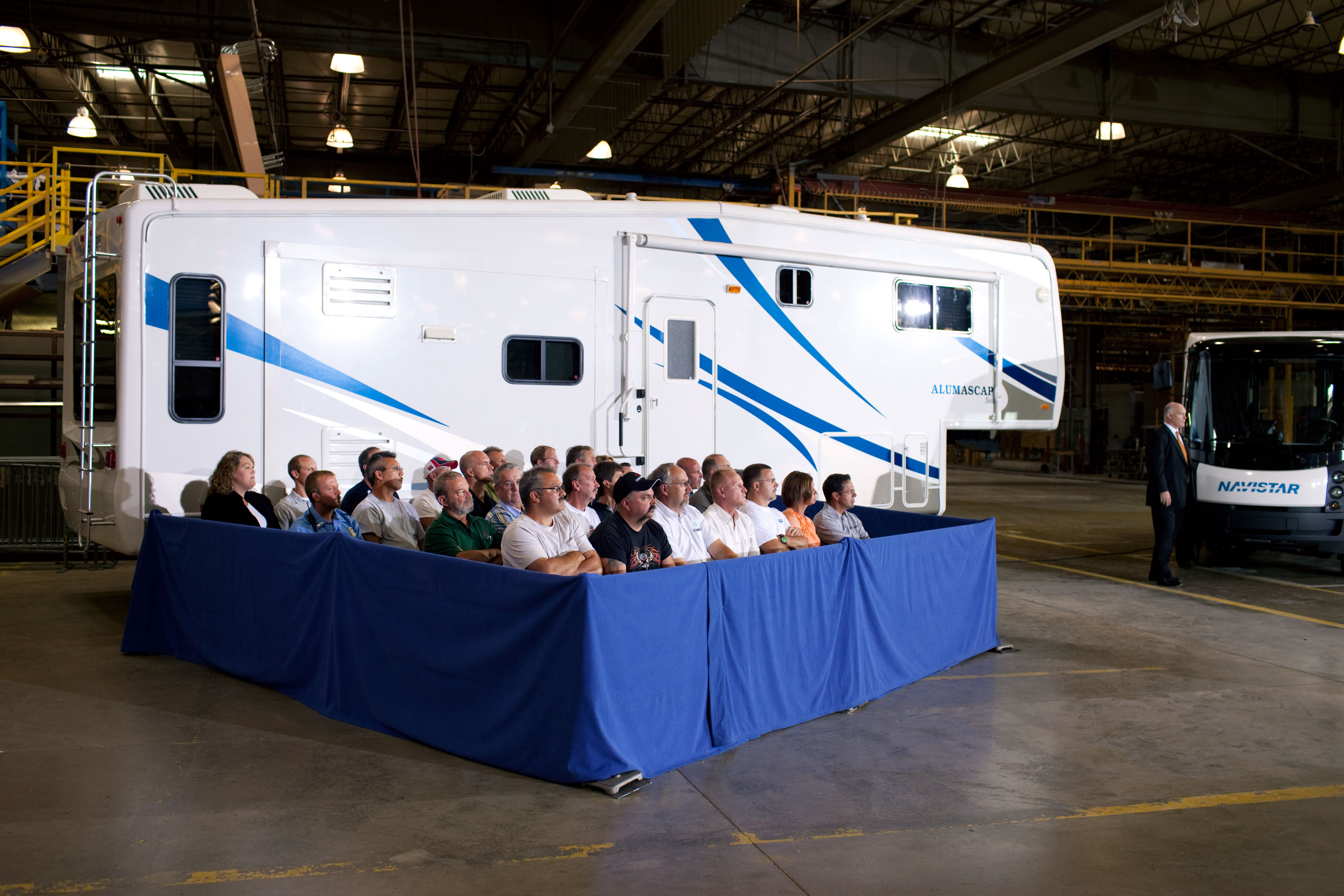
President Barack Obama addressing employees in 2009

In 2005, the company had sales of approximately US$1.2 billion, and employed nearly 5,400 people.

On March 5, 2009, the company filed for Chapter 11 bankruptcy. On April 24, 2009, in U.S. Bankruptcy Court in Delaware, an attorney for Monaco said the company had signed an asset purchase agreement with Workhorse International Holding Co., a Navistar International subsidiary. Monaco's CEO was Kay Toolson. On June 23, 2009, Judge Kevin Carey agreed to the company's request to convert its Chapter 11 bankruptcy filing to a Chapter 7 case so it could liquidate its remaining assets which included seven properties in Oregon, Indiana and Florida as well as RV resort properties in California, Nevada, Florida and Michigan were sold to multiple buyers. The order converting the case to Chapter 7 was effective June 30. Navistar International Corp purchased the core assets of Monaco Coach Corporation's factories, inventory, brands and intellectual property in June 2009 for $47 million and the company's new name became Monaco RV LLC. Upon the sale of its remaining assets liquidated under Chapter 7, "the entity ceases to exist," said Andrea Coles-Bjerre, an assistant law professor at the University of Oregon and a former bankruptcy lawyer in New York.

In 2013 as part of Navistar International Corp. restructuring Monaco RV LLC was sold to Allied Specialty Vehicles
