= List of recreational vehicles =

This is a list various types of recreational vehicles (RVs).

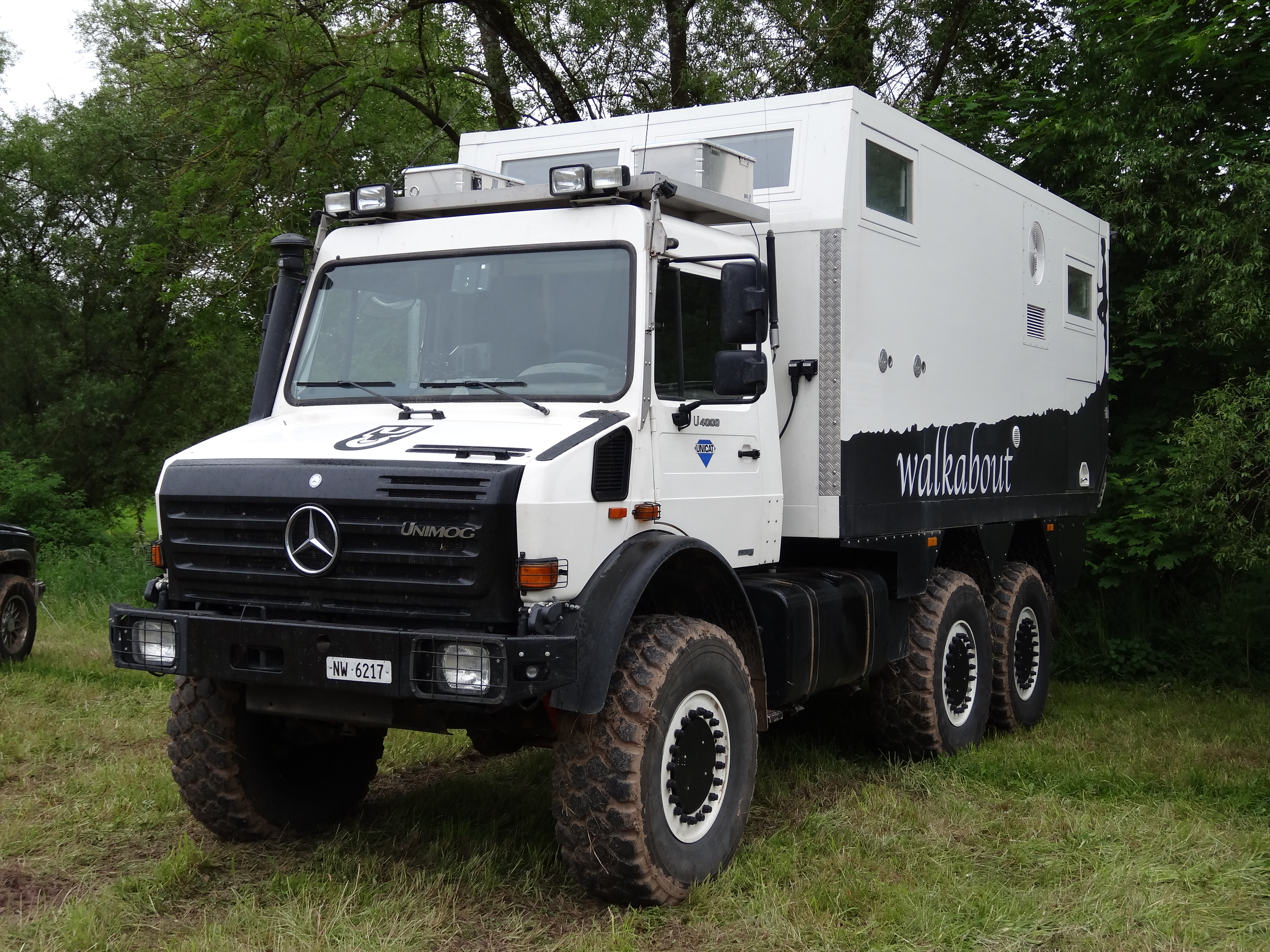
Unimog based 6×6 overlanding capable RV

== Motorhomes ==
Motorhomes are self-propelled vehicles with expanded living quarters.

=== Class A motorhome ===
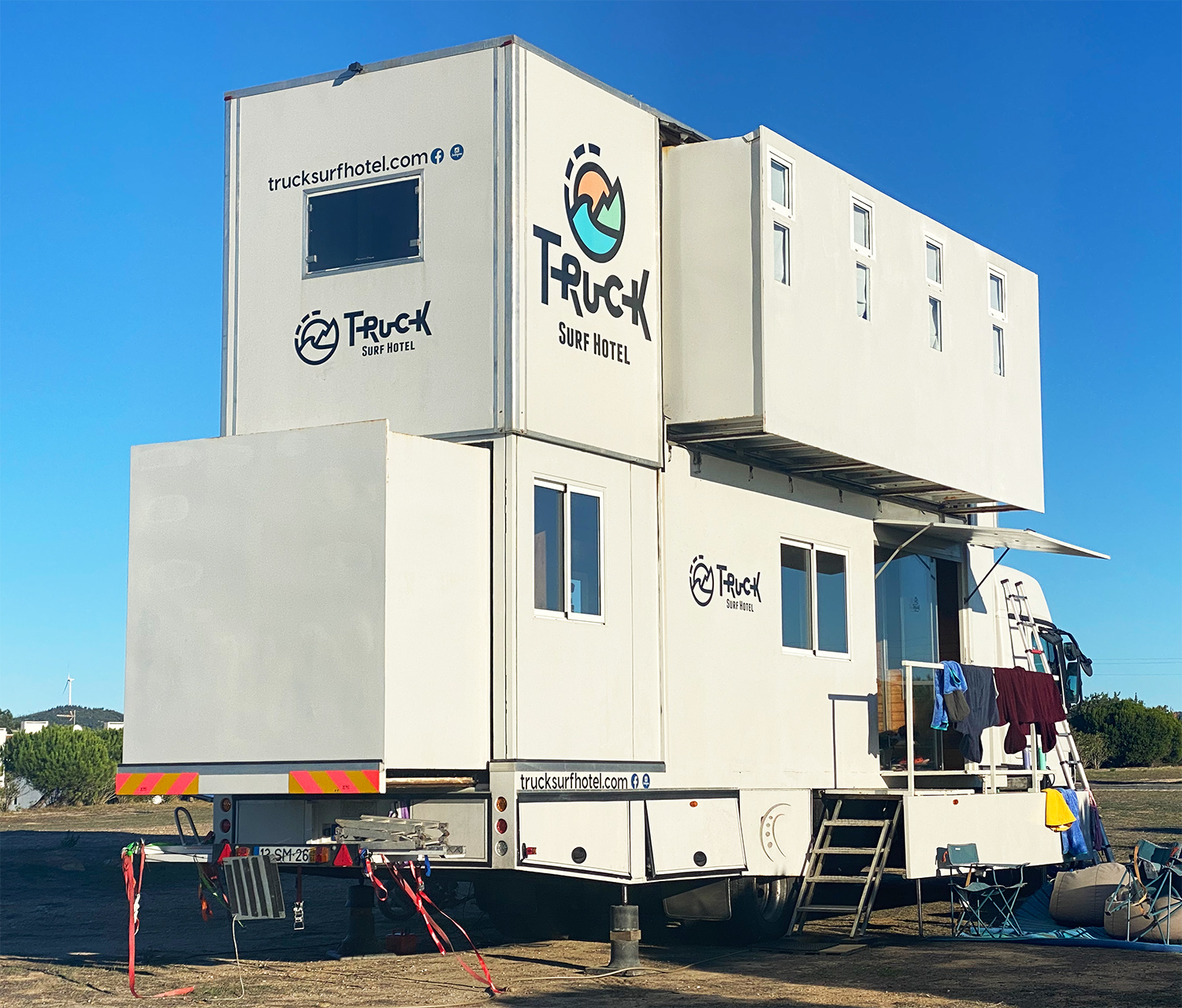
The Truck Surf Hotel, a two-story, five-room hotel built on a Mercedes Actros truck chassis.

Constructed on either a truck chassis, a specially designed motor vehicle chassis, or a commercial bus chassis, a Class A motorhome resembles a bus in design and has a flat or vertical front end with large side windows. Slideouts on these vehicles may allow for wider living areas when parked.

==== Truck conversions ====
The term "truck conversion" has generally come to mean a heavy-duty truck (Class 7/8 semi) chassis with a lengthened frame and living quarters added. Advantages of a truck conversion over a standard Class A are safety, ease of service/maintenance, and usually a much higher power-to-weight ratio, since most semi-tractors are built to move an 80,000-pound (36,000 kg) combined weight. A disadvantage is that with the engine up front, they are louder than when the engine is in the back. They also tend to have a smaller interior than an equivalent-length Class A, since the engine/cab area does not contribute to the living quarters. Truck conversion motorhomes are most popular with the racing and horse community since they are often much better suited to pulling heavy trailers than most other classes of motorhomes.

==== Bus conversions ====
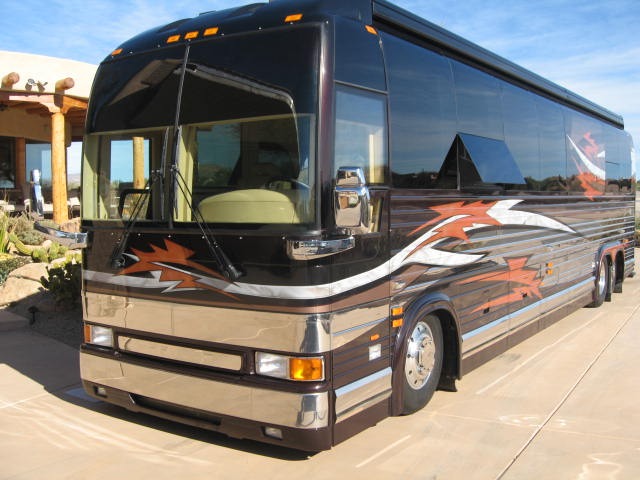
A typical converted bus

A commercial passenger bus that has been converted into an RV, such as a sleeper bus, tour bus, or a campaign bus.

===== Skoolie =====
A 'skoolie' is a former school bus or shuttle bus that has been converted into an RV. This includes full-size buses based on a dedicated school bus chassis, or a "short bus", based on a cutaway van, heavy duty pickup truck cutaway, or medium duty truck cutaway with a bus body attached. (A cutaway is where a vehicle frame is fitted with only a cab, motor, transmission, and tires. A secondary manufacturer is responsible to fit additional body components.) These are usually highly customized and done by their owners. These can be done simply and inexpensively, or elaborately and expensive. Full-size buses will generally fall into the Class A rating, and short buses fall into the Class C rating. There are varying regulations in different states in the United States that affect the conversion of a school bus. Some states, such as California and Illinois, require that the bus's signaling equipment (stop sign, flashing lights, etc.) be removed and the school bus yellow paint scheme be changed. Other states simply require that the "School Bus" signage at the top front and rear be removed. Also, what needs to be installed prior to it being retitled from a bus to an RV varies from state to state. Generally, a bed, stove or oven, water tanks, toilet facilities, sinks, etc must be mounted to the vehicle. Along with that, skoolies are generally a cheaper option but also a vehicle that has the right necessities for one.

=== Class B motorhome (campervan) ===
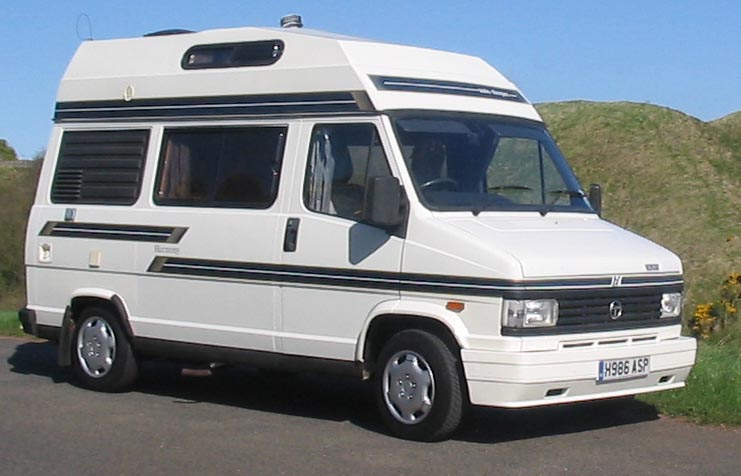
A small class B campervan

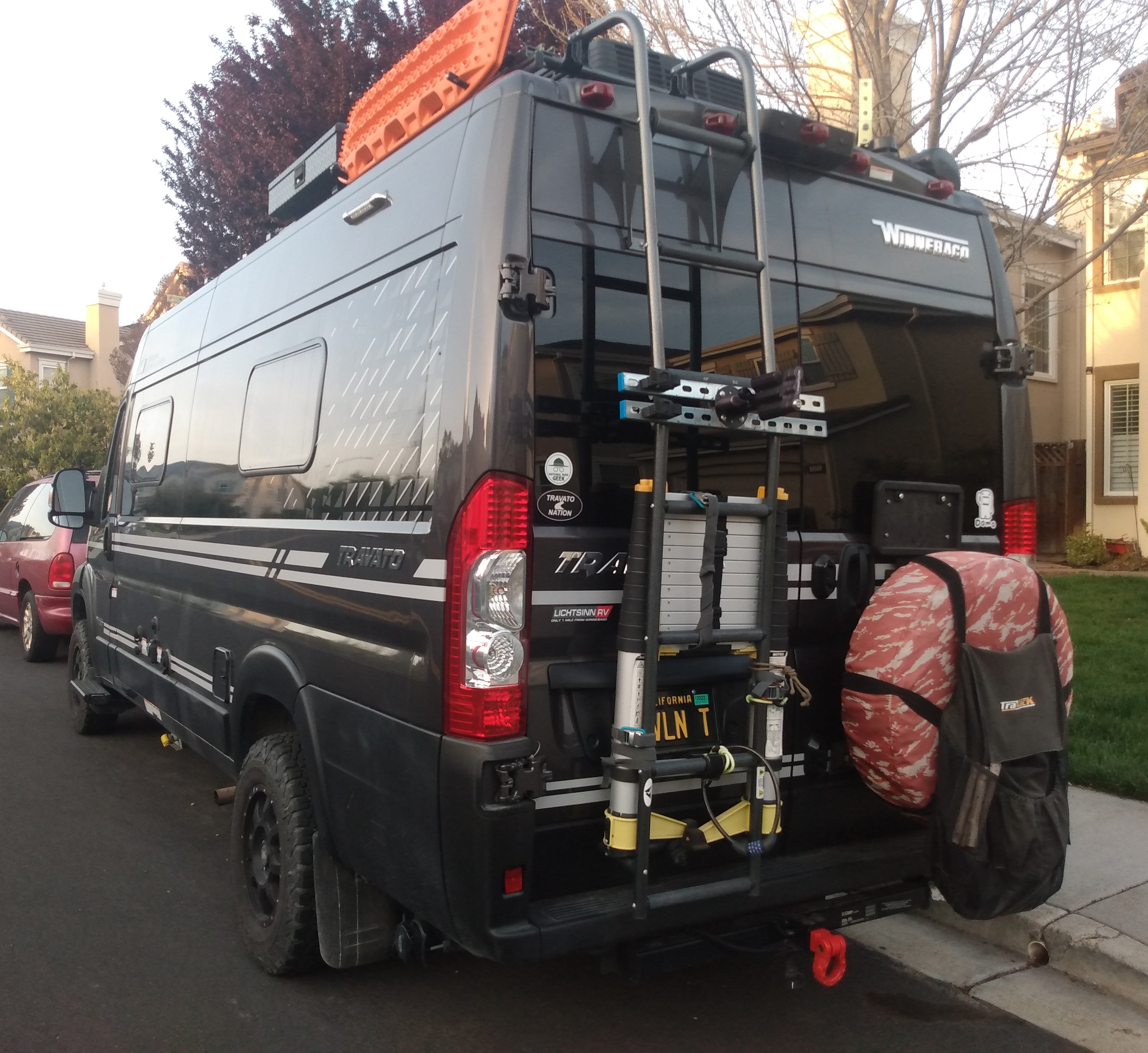
RAM ProMaster Winnebago Travato ClassB

Built using a conventional van, to which either a raised roof has been added or the back replaced by a low-profile body (also called coach-built). In Australia, a Class B motorhome is distinct from a campervan, as it is based on a large van that is, in turn, based on a truck. These motorhomes weigh up to 4,500 kg and measure up to 6.4 m (21 feet) in length.

Most Australian campervans are based on much smaller vehicles such as the Toyota HiAce. Middle size Class B is now populated by larger vans that blur the definition of campervan or motorhome. These include the Ford Transit, Mercedes-Benz Sprinter, Fiat Ducato-Ram ProMaster, and Iveco.

In the United States and Canada, Class B motorhomes are built on several different chassis depending on the motorhome manufacturer and engine design aims. Common chassis include the Mercedes Benz Sprinter diesel, the Ram Promaster gas, the Chevrolet Express gas, and the Ford Transit gas and diesel.

Westfalia one of the founders of small camping vans in the Volkswagen Bus campers, as starting making new Westfalia Class B vans.

In the State of California, in order to qualify as Class B RV, a vehicle must have four of the following six built-in items:

1. a water system, typically a sink or shower
2. a refrigerator
3. a cooking system
4. a fuel or 120 V electrical system
5. an AC unit or heater
6. a toilet
- The Class B+ Van is a small size Class C van, and larger than a Class B.

=== Class C motorhome ===
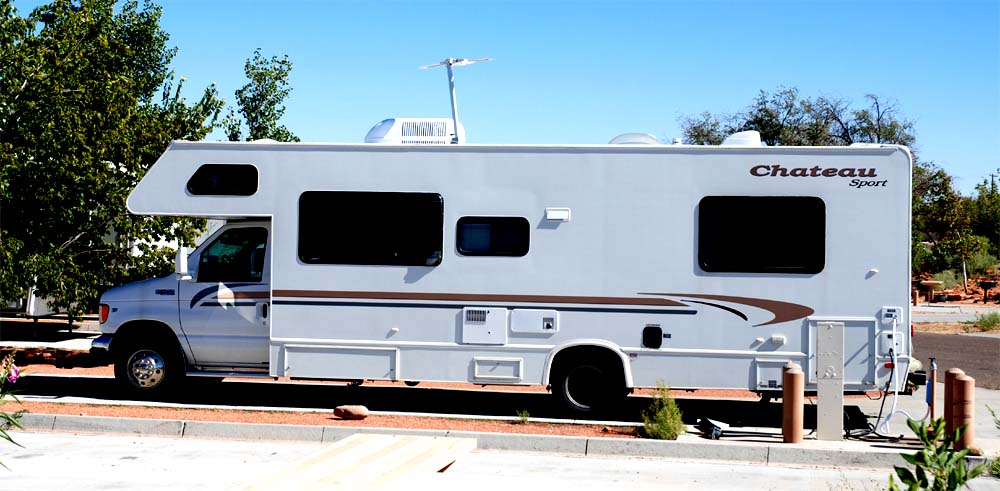
A Class C motorhome

A Class C motorhome is built upon a cutaway medium- or heavy-duty truck or van platform with a forward engine and transmission connected by driveshaft to a rear axle that propels dual-mounted rear wheels. Class C motorhomes are typically powered by gasoline (petrol) engines, although some have been converted to run on propane (autogas) while others use diesels. Transmissions are almost always automatic. The original chassis is equipped from the truck factory to the coachbuilder with an attached forward cab section that is a van or conventional truck-based (known as a cutaway chassis). In North America, the Ford E350 or E450 chassis are the most typical in the 21st century with the Mercedes-Benz Sprinter gaining in popularity. In prior times the Dodge/Ram and Chevrolet/GMC chassis were also used. Some smaller micro motorhomes were produced on Nissan and Toyota platforms from 1972–1994, Toyota Motorhomes continue to have a strong following. In Europe, Ford and Fiat manufacture the majority of Class C motorhome chassis.

The rigid outer weatherproof superstructure of a Class C motorhome (attached onto the original cab and chassis) was typically constructed of a wooden frame covered by sheet metal, but in recent decades such materials as fibreglass, plastics, composites, and lightweight metals have become the norm. With the introduction of slideouts, the earlier design notion of increasing interior space by lengthening the entire motorhome (thus escalating the purchase price) gave way to new designs that offer increased width (albeit only possible in a completely stationary vehicle) while no longer requiring additional length.

Class C motorhomes are characterized by a distinctive cab-over profile, containing either an upper sleeping area, a storage space, or a TV/entertainment section. In the UK, the cab-over is known as a Luton peak or Luton body. A Class C motorhome is equipped with a kitchen/dining area featuring a refrigerator/freezer, a propane range (sometimes with an oven), a microwave oven, and a table with seating. It also has a lavatory with bath/shower, and has one or more sleeping areas as well as additional seating towards the front. An air conditioner, a water heater, a furnace, and an outside canopy are usually included. Optional equipment available at additional expense typically includes a generator set and roof-mounted solar power panels.

Some very large Class C motorhomes are based on even larger truck platforms, such as the Ford F650 and Freightliner XC chassis. These may be known as Super C class motorhomes.

A sub-category of Class C motorhomes is the toy hauler, which combines a typical configuration with additional enclosed space aft dedicated to hauling dirt bikes, bicycles, ATVs or the like. Class C motorhomes often feature a towing hitch enabling the pulling of a lightweight trailer such as for boats, or of a small car or truck. Class C motorhomes may also be referred to in some places as mini-motorhomes.

== Truck camper ==
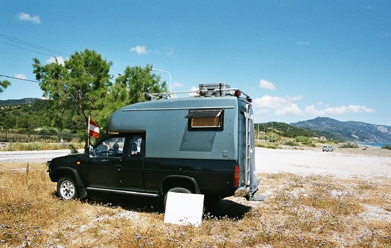
A truck camper

A truck camper is a living space unit that is temporarily mounted into the bed of a pickup truck or flatbed ute and secured against any tipping or wobbling while the truck is in motion. Great care must be taken in matching the weight and center balance point of the truck camper with the capabilities of the pickup truck itself in order to maintain safe handling of the vehicle while driving. Truck campers are much favored by those who do not wish to own a motorhome or trailer for only part-time use when the need for a truck is otherwise present.

Common uses are for backwoods travel, hunting, fishing, and particularly in North America on four wheel drive vehicles for off-roading or via rough roads to campsites. The smallest of truck campers provide a sleeping area with perhaps an ice box and storage cabinetry, while top-of-the-line campers feature a refrigerator/freezer, propane range/oven, microwave oven, air conditioner, furnace, water heater, and lavatory with shower. With the introduction of slideouts, the earlier design notion of increasing interior space by lengthening the entire camper (thus escalating the purchase price) gave way to new designs that offer increased width (albeit only possible in a completely stationary vehicle) while no longer requiring additional length.

In North America, typically 3/4- or 1-ton pickup trucks are used for hauling full size slideout-equipped campers (e.g., the Chevrolet/GMC 2500 through 3500 range, the Ram 2500 through 3500 range, and the Ford F-250 through 350 range), usually with long box bed lengths and sometimes with dual-mounted rear tires (dually) for the heaviest camper models.

== Trailers ==
Trailers are wheeled living spaces without onboard propulsion, and are towed by another vehicle.

=== Popup camper ===
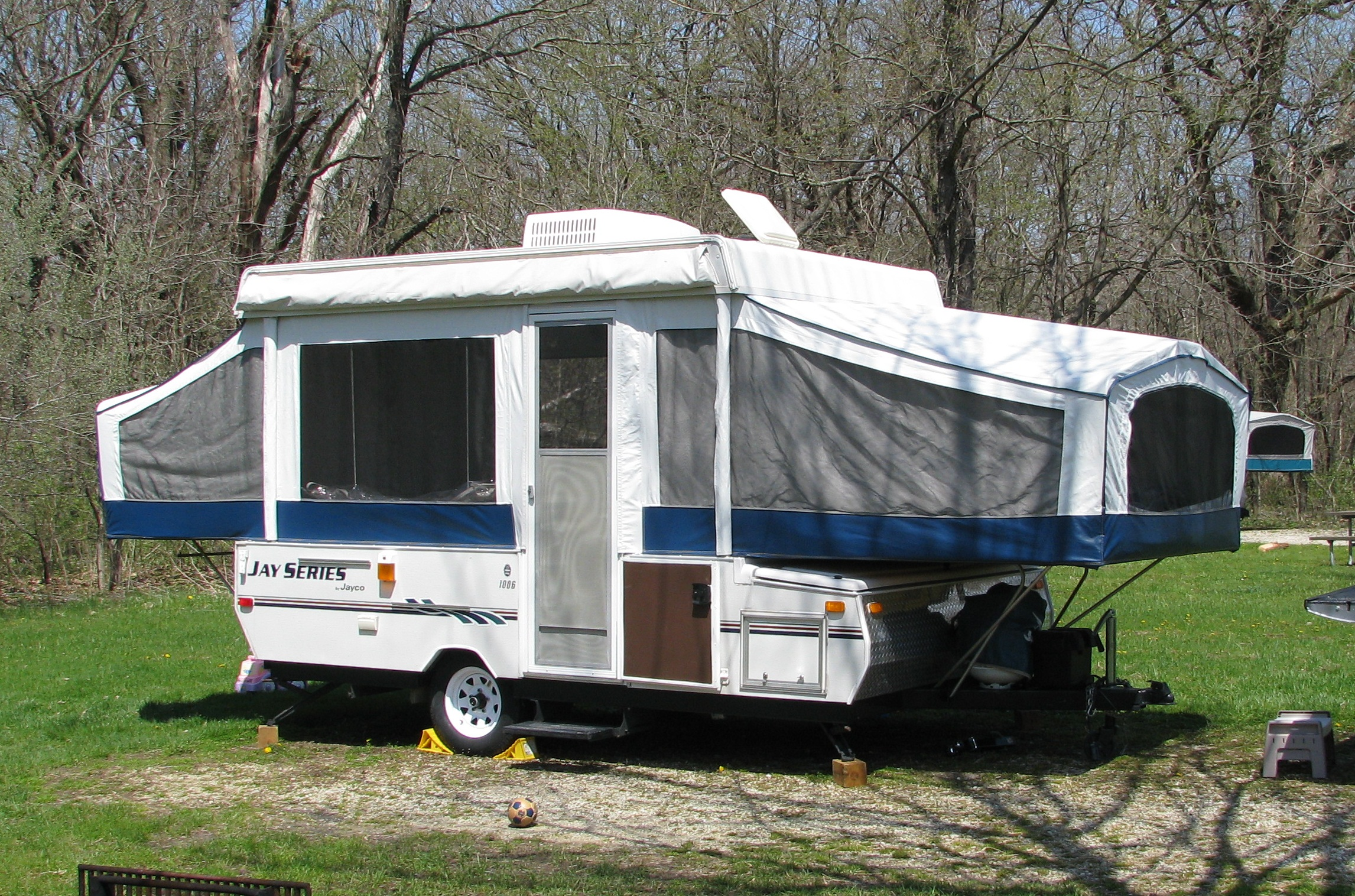
A popup camper (a.k.a. tent trailer)

Also known as a folding trailer, tent camper, tent trailer, or camper trailer, a popup trailer is a light-weight unit with pull-out bunks and tent walls that collapse for towing and for non-use storage. These campers are suitable for towing by most vehicles.

=== Travel trailer ===
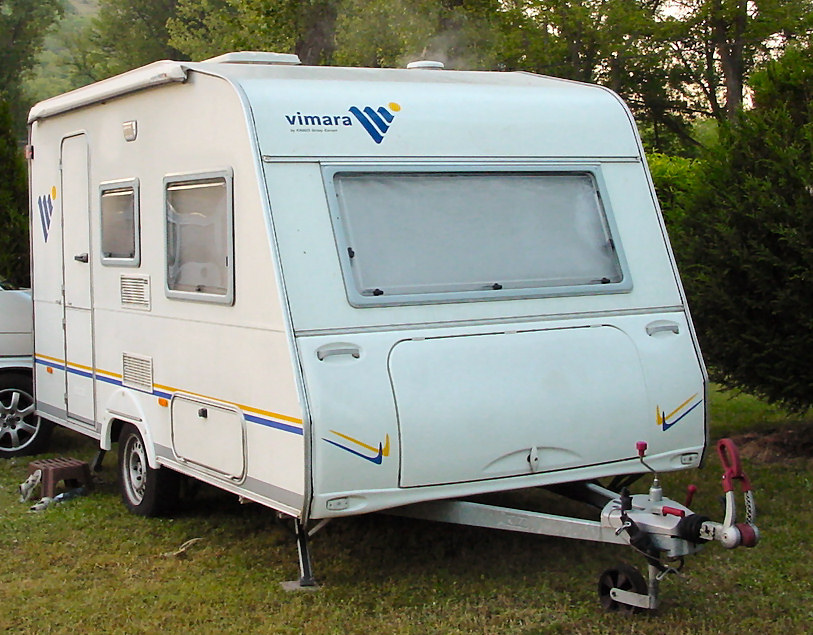
A European caravan

A unit with rigid sides designed to be towed, usually by a pickup truck, SUV, or minivan, with a bumper or frame hitch. In Britain and Australia they are known as caravans. Bumper pull travel trailers like these range from 19' to 34' long. They are typically pulled by a large SUV or light to medium pickup truck (Class 2, 3 or 4). Bumper pull travel trailers have between 1 and 4 axles.

==== Camper or Travel trailer ====
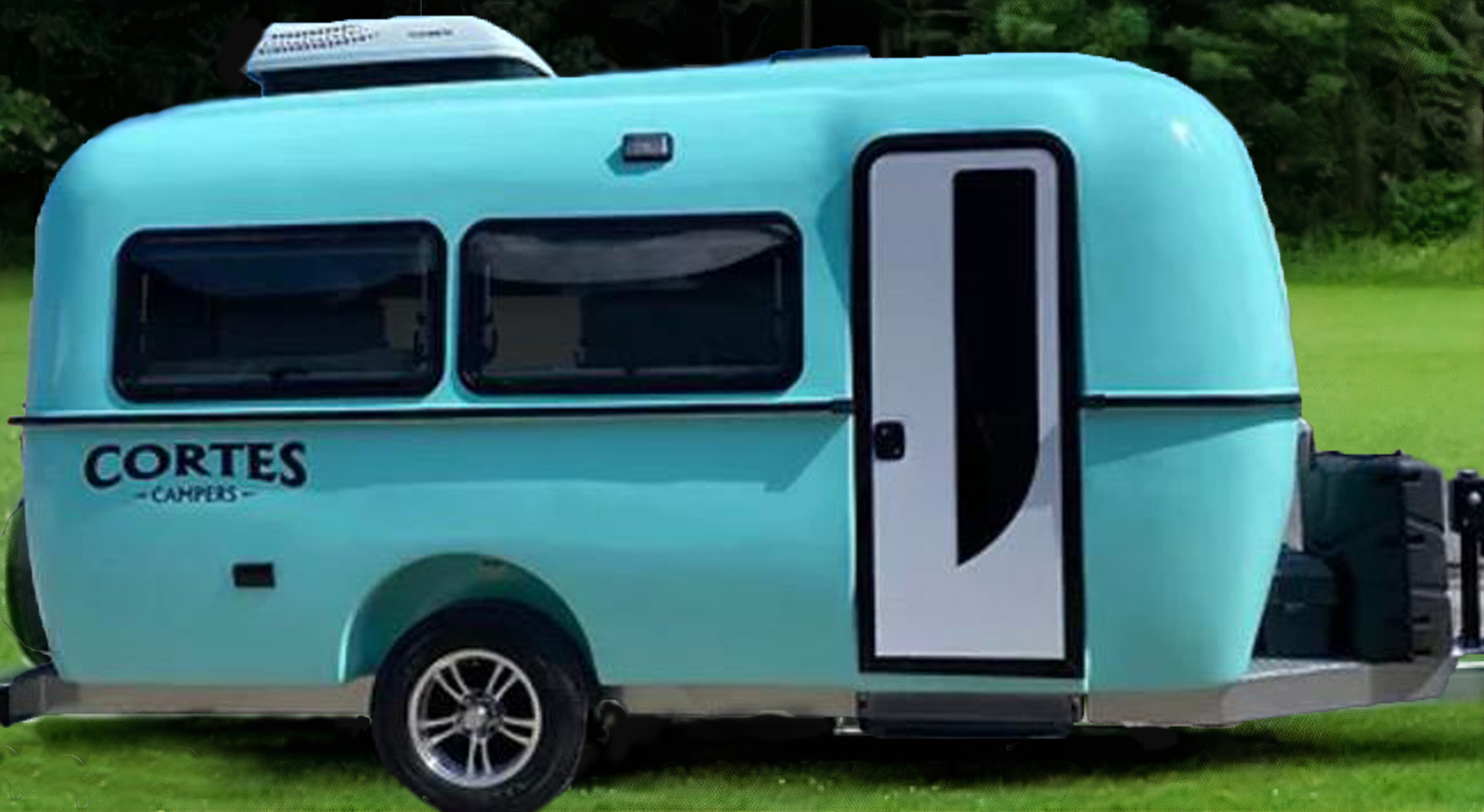
American complete fiberglass hull camper trailer

A rigid-sided, transportable, enclosed unit or vehicle designed to be towed behind a truck or automobile with a bumper or frame hitch. They are designed to be utilized primarily for recreational or temporary purposes. Camper trailers or travel trailers generally have dimensions of less than ten (10') feet in width and forty (40') feet in length. They are designed with features that allow for quick set up, disconnection, removal and transport. In the past, travel trailers were heavy and needed to be pulled by a large SUV or light to medium truck (Class 2, 3, or 4) and have between one and four axles. With recent innovations, designs, and technologies, some smaller camper/travel trailers can easily be pulled with smaller SUV's such as Jeeps, or crossover vehicles.

==== Teardrop trailer ====
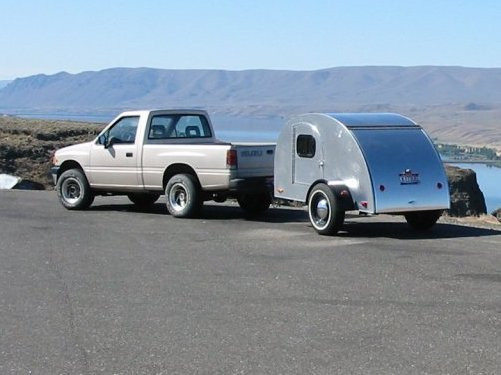
A Teardrop Trailer

A compact, lightweight travel trailer that resembles a large teardrop designed to be towed by light-duty vehicles, including motorcycles.

==== Hybrid trailer ====
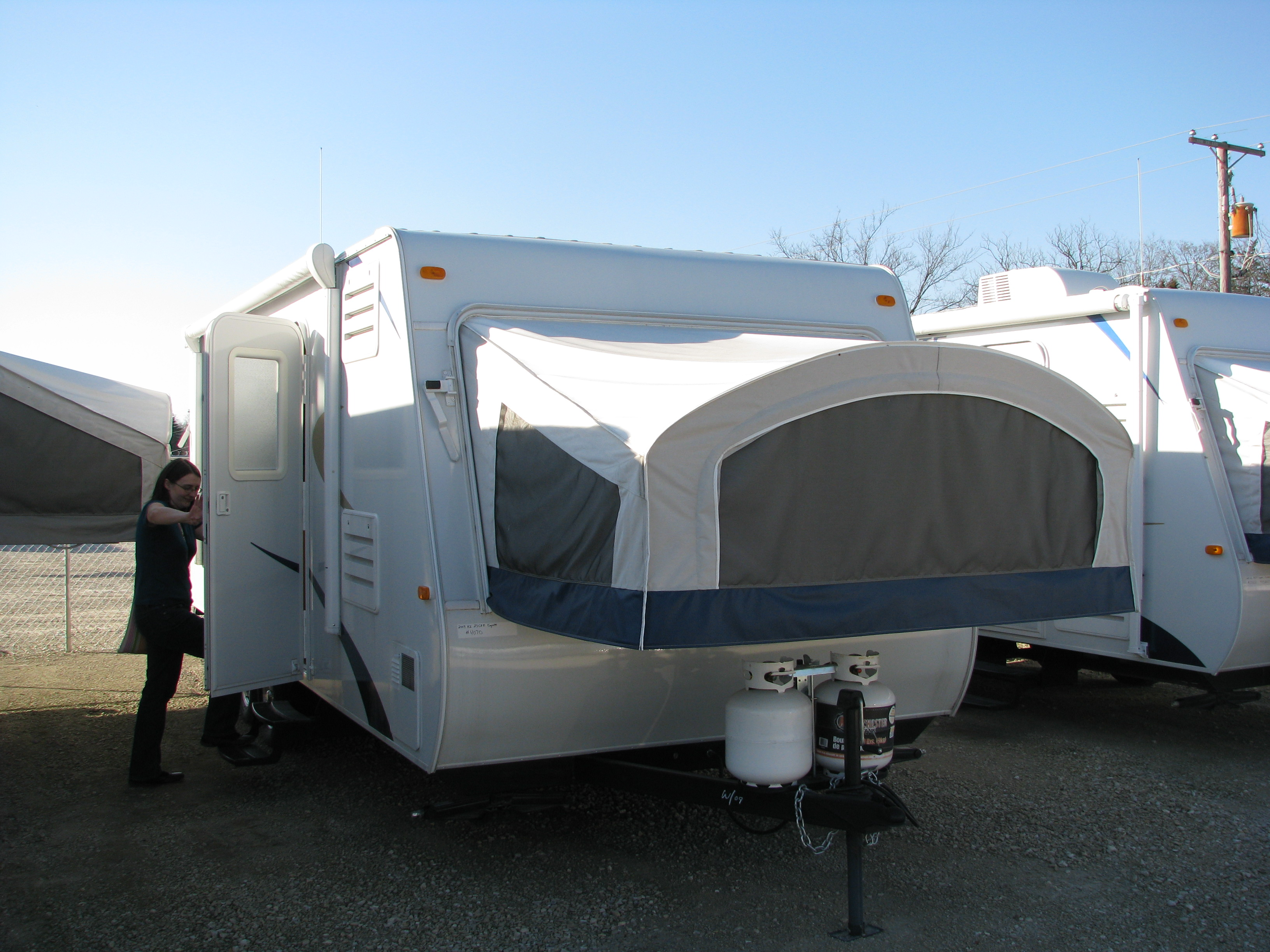
A hybrid travel trailer

A blend between a travel trailer and a folding (tent) trailer. One type has rigid sides and pull-out tent sections (usually beds) while another type's top section of walls and its roof can be lowered over its bottom section to reduce its height for towing.

=== Fifth-wheel trailer ===
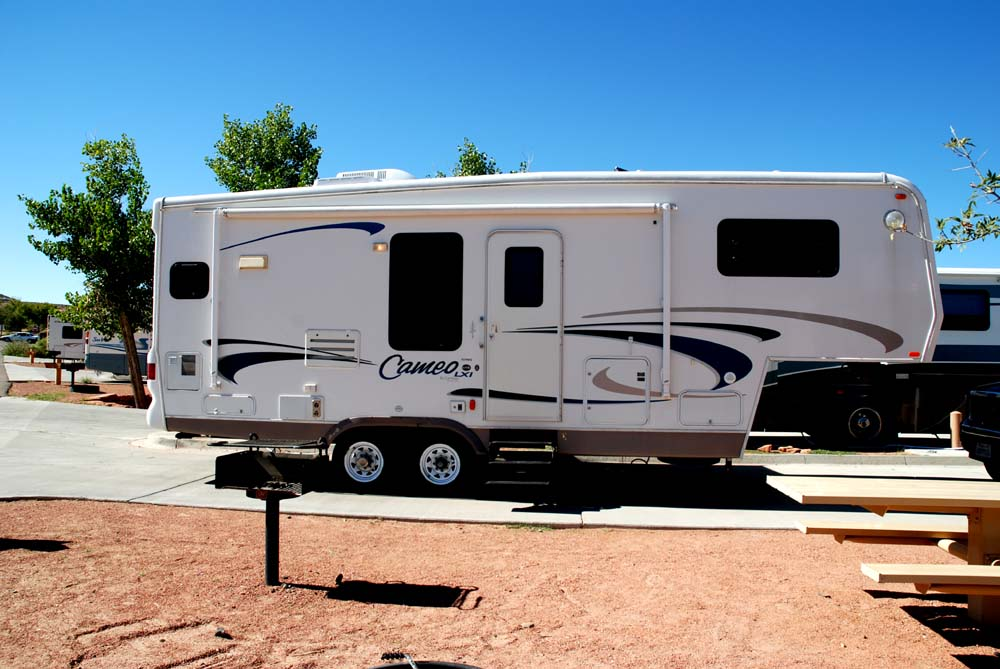
A fifth-wheel trailer

Designed to be towed by a pickup or medium duty truck equipped with a special in-box hitch called a fifth wheel coupling. Part of the trailer body extends over the truck bed, shortening the total length of the vehicle and trailer combined. Some larger fifth-wheel trailers, usually over 40 feet (12.2 m) in length and 18,000 pounds (8,200 kg) in weight, are full-size semi-trailers pulled by semi-trucks. Fifth-wheel trailers have become increasingly popular since they first became commercially available in the late 1960s. For some pickup truck owners the downside of a fifth-wheel trailer versus a conventional frame-hitch-mount travel trailer is that the former takes up space inside the truck cargo bed.

=== Park model (vacation/resort cottage) ===
This is a larger travel trailer – 35 to 45 feet long – that is not self-contained. It is designed for park camping only; and while it is easily moved from site to site as a normal trailer is, it is not capable of "dry camping" as it does not have any water storage tanks and must be used with hookups.
