= AFCC =

AFCC may refer to:

- A.F.C. Craigavon
- Air Force Communications Command, an old name for what is now the Air Force Communications Agency
- Armed Forces Chaplaincy Center, U.S. military chaplain training, Ft. Jackson, Columbia, SC
- Armed Forces Chaplaincy Centre, UK military chaplain training, Beckett House, Defence Academy of the United Kingdom
- Association of Family and Conciliation Courts
- Automotive Fuel Cell Cooperation
- Australian Federation of Civil Celebrants
- Australian Federation of Construction Contractors
- Australian Financial and Career Consortium
