= AC Transit fleet =

Bus fleet of AC Transit

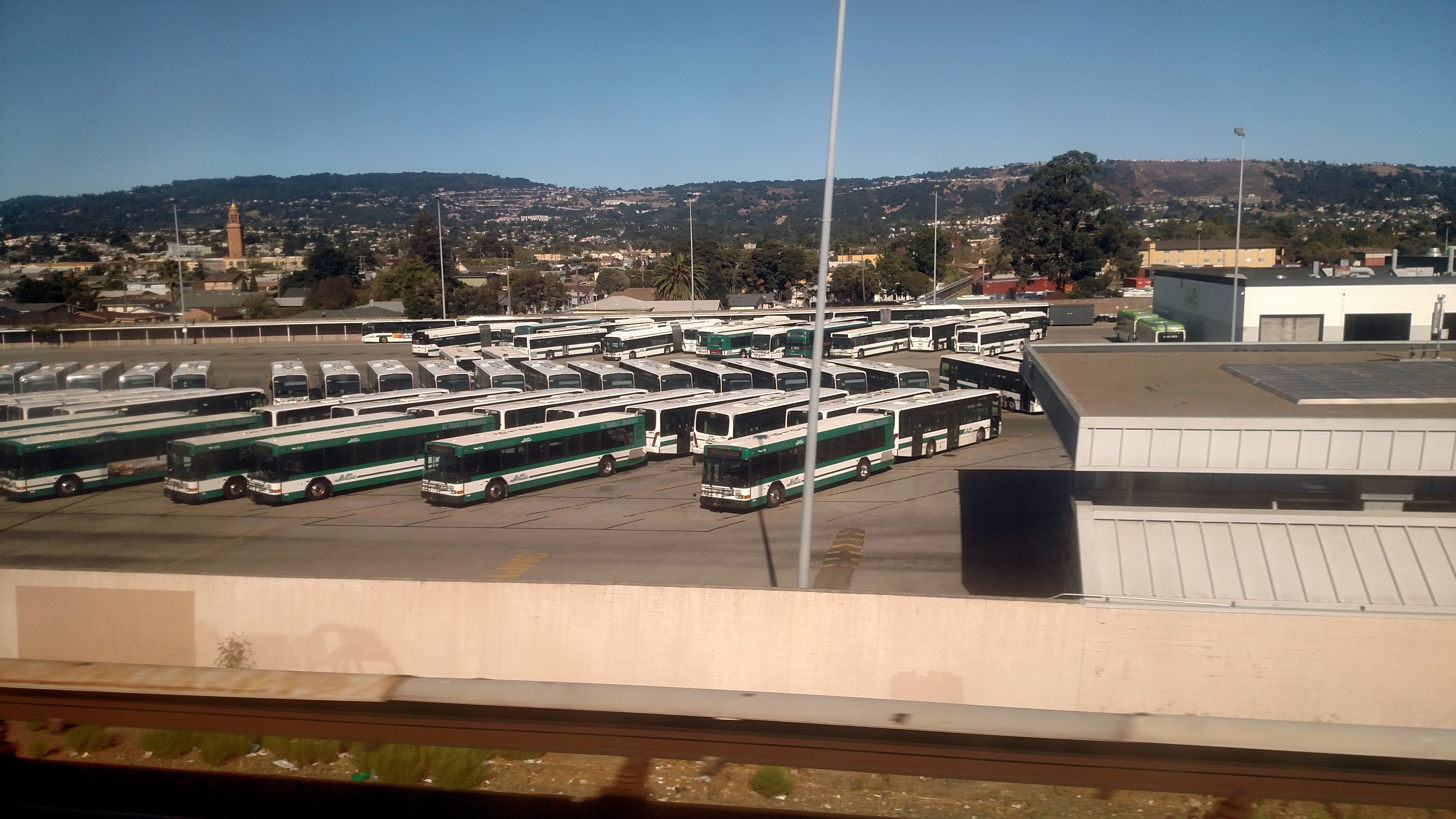
Seminary Division, also known as East Oakland or Division 4 (Oct 2017)

The bus fleet of the Alameda-Contra Costa Transit District (AC Transit), serving the counties of Alameda and Contra Costa, is the third-largest in California. It was initially formed in 1960 (66 years ago) with a mixture of gasoline and diesel-powered buses purchased from its immediate predecessor, the privately owned Key System. The first new buses were purchased for AC Transit in 1960, shortly after its formation and the GM New Look buses were delivered later that year. The transit agency operated GM buses exclusively until 1974, when the first Flxible New Look buses were ordered. Since then, AC Transit has ordered and operated buses from most of the major North American transit bus manufacturers, including Flyer, Gillig, Motor Coach Industries, Neoplan USA, and North American Bus Industries, as well as Van Hool, a Belgian bus supplier.

AC Transit has four operating divisions where buses are stored and light maintenance is performed, one central maintenance facility for major overhauls, and a general office in downtown Oakland, California.

== Summary ==
AC Transit is the third-largest bus-only transit agency in California, carrying an average of 200,000 riders per weekday on 331 service lines, with 20,000,000 miles (32,000,000 km) miles of annual revenue service traveled by its fleet of buses.

=== Active ===
Current Fleet
Year	Manufacturer	Model	Length (feet)	Qty	Fleet Series	Fuel	Image
2008–09	Van Hool	A300K	30	9*	5101-5139	Diesel	
2009	Van Hool	AG300-4 (articulated)	60	5*	2191-2199	Diesel	
2013	Gillig	Low Floor	40	13*	1301-1365	Diesel	
2013	New Flyer	Xcelsior XD60 (articulated)	60	23	2201-2223	Diesel	AC Transit bus #2209 at 20th Street and Broadway in Oakland in February 2014.
2013	Gillig	Low Floor	40	54	6101-6154	Diesel	An image of an AC Transit bus taken at the San Francisco Temporary Transbay Terminal in mid November 2013. The bus is the commuter-styled Gillig Low Floor Advantage bus with Wi-Fi, and was operating on the NL Transbay line.
2014	Gillig	Low Floor	40	68	1401-1468	Diesel	AC Transit bus #1455 operating on the 18 line at its 20th and Broadway stop.
2015	ElDorado National	Aerotech 220	24	6	3505-3510	Diesel	AC Transit bus #3403 waiting at the Transbay Temporary Terminal in San Francisco during the Labor Day 2015 BART Transbay Tube closure.
2016	Gillig	Low Floor	40	55	1501-1555	Diesel	AC Transit bus #1505 at 20th Street and Broadway in Oakland.
2016	Gillig	Low Floor	40	25	1556-1580	Diesel-Electric Hybrid	AC Transit bus #1559 Rockridge BART Station in Oakland.
2017	Gillig	Low Floor	40	10	1581-1590	Diesel	
2018	Alexander Dennis	Enviro500	42	15	6201-6215	Diesel	
2018	New Flyer	Xcelsior XD60 (articulated)	60	29	2224-2252	Diesel	
2019	Gillig	Low Floor HEV	40	1	1591	Diesel-Electric Hybrid	
2018	Gillig	Low Floor	40	35	1601-1635	Diesel	
2022	Gillig	Low Floor	40	50	1641-1690	Diesel	
2016–17	New Flyer	Xcelsior XDE60 (Note: BRT model, used on Tempo BRT service) (articulated)	60	27	2301-2327	Diesel-Electric Hybrid	
2018–19	New Flyer	Xcelsior XHE40	40	10	7017-7026	Hydrogen Fuel Cell	
2019	New Flyer	Xcelsior XE40	40	5	8001-8005	Battery Electric	
2021	Gillig	Low Floor EV	40	2	8006-8007	Battery Electric	
2022	New Flyer	Xcelsior XHE40	40	20	7031-7050	Hydrogen Fuel Cell	
2022	Gillig	Low Floor EV	40	21	8008-8028	Battery Electric	
2022–23	MCI	D45 CRT LE	45	36	6301-6336	Diesel	
2024	Gillig	Low Floor	40	50	1701-1750	Diesel	
2025-26	New Flyer	Xcelsior XHE60 (articulated)	60	9	2501-2509	Hydrogen Fuel Cell	

=== Future Fleet ===
Future Fleet
Year	Manufacturer	Model	Length (feet)	Quantity	Fleet Series	Fuel	Image	Notes
2026	Gillig	Low Floor EV	35	10	TBD	Battery Electric		To replace the final A300Ks still in service

=== Retired ===
Retired Fleet
Year	Manufacturer	Model	Length (feet)	Qty	Fleet Series	Preserved	Fuel	Image
ex-Key System buses
1941–42	White	788 (Note: Purchased from Key System in 1960.)	33	23	815-898 (Note: Discontiguous range. 815, 816, 821, 822, 826, 831, 832, 837, 843, 854, 859, 864, 865, 867, 873, 875, 881, 884, 885, 887, 895, 896, and 898.)		Gasoline	
1944–45	White	798	35	91	900-999 (Note: Discontiguous range. 901, 918, 923, 939, 942, 954, 962, 972, 979 not purchased.)		Gasoline	
1947–48	White	798	35	75	1000-1074		Gasoline	
1947	Mack	C-41-GT	33' 2"	60	2501-2560		Gasoline	
1946	GM	TGM-3609 Old Look	30' 9"	45	1300-1344		Gasoline (Note: 20 buses were repowered with diesel engines, renumbered into 1200 series)	
1946	GM	TGM-3609 Old Look	30' 9"	20	1200-1241		Diesel (Note: The 20 buses in the 12xx series were repowered with diesel engines in 1961, renumbered directly from former 13xx fleet numbers: 1200 (ex-1300), 1202 (ex-1302), 1203, 1205, 1209, 1212, 1213, 1215, 1217, 1220, 1224, 1228, 1230, 1232, 1233, 1234, 1235, 1236, 1238, and 1241.)	
1947	GM	TDH-4008 Old Look (Note: Originally built for Omaha & Council Bluffs Railway, traded to Key System in 1951.)	33	5	1401-1405		Diesel	
1944	GM	TD-4006 Old Look (Note: Purchased from Long Beach to provide parts for diesel conversion of 13xx. Used for storage afterwards.)	33	5	1500-1504		Diesel	
1940–41	GM	TD-4001 Old Look (Note: Purchased from Fresno City Lines to provide parts for diesel conversion of 13xx. Originally from San Diego. Some were rebuilt and used for revenue service.)	33	4	1501-1504		Diesel	
1947–48	GM	TDH-4507 Old Look	35	175	1700-1874 (Note: 1700-1859 were originally purchased by Key System; 1860-1874 were ex-Omaha buses.)		Diesel	
1949	GM	TDH-4509 Old Look	35	25	1900-1924	1921 (Note: Repainted in Key System livery in 1980, overhauled in 1995.)	Diesel	
1950–51	GM	TDH-5103 Old Look	39' 6"	50	2000-2049		Diesel	
1958	GM	TDH-4801 Old Look	37' 6"	21	2100-2120	2103 (Note: Loaned to Santa Clara County Transit District in 1979 for training, retired in 1980. Repainted in Key System livery in 1980, restored in 1995.) (Note: At Pacific Bus Museum.)	Diesel	
New buses purchased by AC Transit
1960–61	GM	SDH-4501 New Look	35	57	100-156	100 (Note: Retired in 1983, returned to AC Transit in 1996/97.)	Diesel	
1961	GM	SDM-4501 New Look	35	5	300-304 (Note: Renumbered to 175-179 in 1963.)		Diesel	
1961	GM	TDH-4516 New Look	35	50	400-449		Diesel	
1961	GM	TDH-5301 New Look	40	125	500-624 (Note: Replaced the 8xx, 9xx, 10xx White-manufactured buses purchased from Key System.)		Diesel	
1961–62	GM	TDH-4517 New Look	35	43	700–712; 720-749		Diesel	
1963–66	GM	TDH-5304 New Look	40	65	300-364		Diesel	
1963–66	GM	TDH-4519 New Look	35	55	750-804		Diesel	
1968–69	GM	T6H-5305 New Look	40	55	626-680		Diesel	
1968	GM	T6H-4532 New Look	35	5	805-809		Diesel	
1971–72	GM	T6H-5305 New Look	40	90	900-989		Diesel (Note: Fitted with Environmental Improvement Kit to control smog-forming emissions.)	
1973	GM	T6H-5307N New Look	35	55	810-864	839 (Note: Purchased by Ron Hook in 1989, traded back to AC Transit.)	Diesel	
1961 (1974)	GM	TDH-4517 New Look	29	13	700S-712S (Note: Shortened from 700-712 for on-demand service; 708 served as the prototype.)		Diesel	
1974	Flxible	53102 New Look	40	120	180-299		Diesel	
1975	Flxible	53102 New Look	40	36	8000-8035 (Note: Originally purchased under a contract with BART for shuttle service and painted in BART colors; after the contract was canceled, repainted in AC Transit livery.)		Diesel	
1976	Minibus	MBD-8002	25	29	2200-2228		Diesel	
1978	M.A.N.	SG 220 (articulated)	60	30	1600-1629		Diesel	
1980–82	Western Flyer	D901 (Note: Purchased after a contract with GMC for RTS buses fell through.)	40	170	1000-1169 (Note: Nos. 1155-1169 were built in 1982, without air conditioning.)		Diesel	
1980	Western Flyer	D901	35	20	2000-2019	2013 (Note: Stored after retirement in 1997.)	Diesel	
1982–84	Gillig	Phantom	40	226	1300–1390; 1400–1483; 1485; 1500-1549 (Note: 1500-1549 were originally purchased for BART contract service and repainted into AC Transit livery at the end of that contract.)		Diesel	
1982–83	Gillig	Phantom	35	51	2049-2099		Diesel	
1983	Neoplan	AN440	40	61	1200-1260		Diesel	
1984	Neoplan	AN408	26	3	2300-2302		Diesel	
1983	M.A.N.	SG 310 (articulated)	60	15	1630-1644 (Note: Originally built for VTA, sold to AC Transit in 1988.)		Diesel	
1983	Crown-Ikarus	286 (articulated)	60	15	1700-1714		Diesel	
1988	New Flyer	D35HF	35	29	2400-2428		Diesel	
1988–89	New Flyer	D40HF	40	79	2500-2578		Diesel	
1989	New Flyer	D60HF (articulated)	60	30	1800-1829		Diesel	
1990	Gillig	Phantom	40	52	2601-2652		Diesel	
1991-92	Gillig	Phantom	30	62	2701-2762	2738	Diesel	
1993	Gillig	Phantom	40	60	2801-2860		Diesel	
1996	New Flyer	D60HF (articulated)	60	30	1901-1930		Diesel	
1997–98	NABI	416	40	204	2901–2971; 3001–3067; 3101-3166		Diesel	
2000	MCI	D4500	45	30	6001-6030		Diesel	AC Transit bus #6023 at the Transbay Temporary Terminal in July 2014.
2001	MCI	D4500	45	10	6031-6040		Diesel	
2003	MCI	D4500	45	39	6041-6079		Diesel	
1999–2003	NABI	40-LFW	40	84	4001–4021; 4051–4090; (Note: 4089 and 4090 do not have a back window) 7201-7223		Diesel	
2003	Van Hool	AG300 (articulated)	60	30	2001-2057		Diesel	
2005	Van Hool	A300K	30	51	5001-5051		Diesel	
2005	Van Hool/ ISE/ UTC Power	A330 FC	40	3	FC1–FC3 (Note: Fuel cell and drivetrain removed for installation in FC4–FC16)		Hydrogen	
2006	Van Hool	AG300	60	25	2101-2110; 2151-2165		Diesel	
2008	Van Hool	A300L	40	27	1201-1227		Diesel	
2010	Van Hool	A300L FC	40	13	FC4 - FC16			

=== Experimental and prototype ===
Experimental and prototype fleet
Year	Manufacturer	Model	Length (feet)	Qty	Fleet Series	Fuel	Image
1966 (1958)	Kässbohrer A.G.	Super Golden Eagle	60 articulated	1	XMC-77 (Note: Experimental articulated bus dubbed the "Freeway Train". Trial began in March 1966.)	Diesel	
1967	GM	TDH-5303 New Look	40	1	XMC-53 (625) (Note: Originally built for Muni with GM's first eight-cylinder engine; after Muni testing was complete, tested by AC Transit and accepted into revenue service as 625.)	Diesel	
1971 (1969)	GM	T6H-5305 New Look	40	1	666 (Note: Developed under a 1969 grant. Converted to and ran under steam power between Sept 27, 1971 and Sept 29, 1972. Power and acceleration were improved, but the reciprocating steam engine had higher fuel consumption. Converted back to diesel after experiment concluded.)	Steam	
1973 (1961)	GM	TDH-4517 New Look	29	1	708S (Note: Sectioned and shortened to 29 feet (8.8 m) as a prototype for on-demand service. The remaining 7xx series buses were also shortened.)	Diesel	
1983	Neoplan	Skyliner	40	1	(Note: Tested in April 1983. 73 seats total, 53 on upper level.)	Diesel	
1986 (1963)	GM/Flyer	TDH-5304 New Look & D901	40	1	311 (Note: Combined the chassis and cab of GM TDH-5304 #311 with the passenger section of a Flyer D901.)	Diesel	
1999	APS Systems	Custom low-floor	40	1	999 (Note: Battery electric bus with onboard propane-fired generator (Mazda 13B) for charging. Tested in 1998; bus later tested by OCTA.)	Propane-Electric	
1999	New Flyer / Ballard / XCELLSiS	ZEbus (F40LF)	40	1	—	Hydrogen	
2002	ElDorado National / Thor / ISE	ThunderPower (E-Z Rider II)	30	1	4285 (Note: Fuel cell bus initially built for SunLine Transit Agency. AC Transit tested the vehicle for one year starting in 2003.)	Hydrogen	
2015	New Flyer	Xcelsior XHE60 (articulated)	60	1	2501	Hydrogen Fuel Cell (Note: pilot program; originally built in 2015 for National Fuel Cell Bus program & Altoona testing, sold to AC Transit in 2019, returned to New Flyer in late 2021)	

== History ==
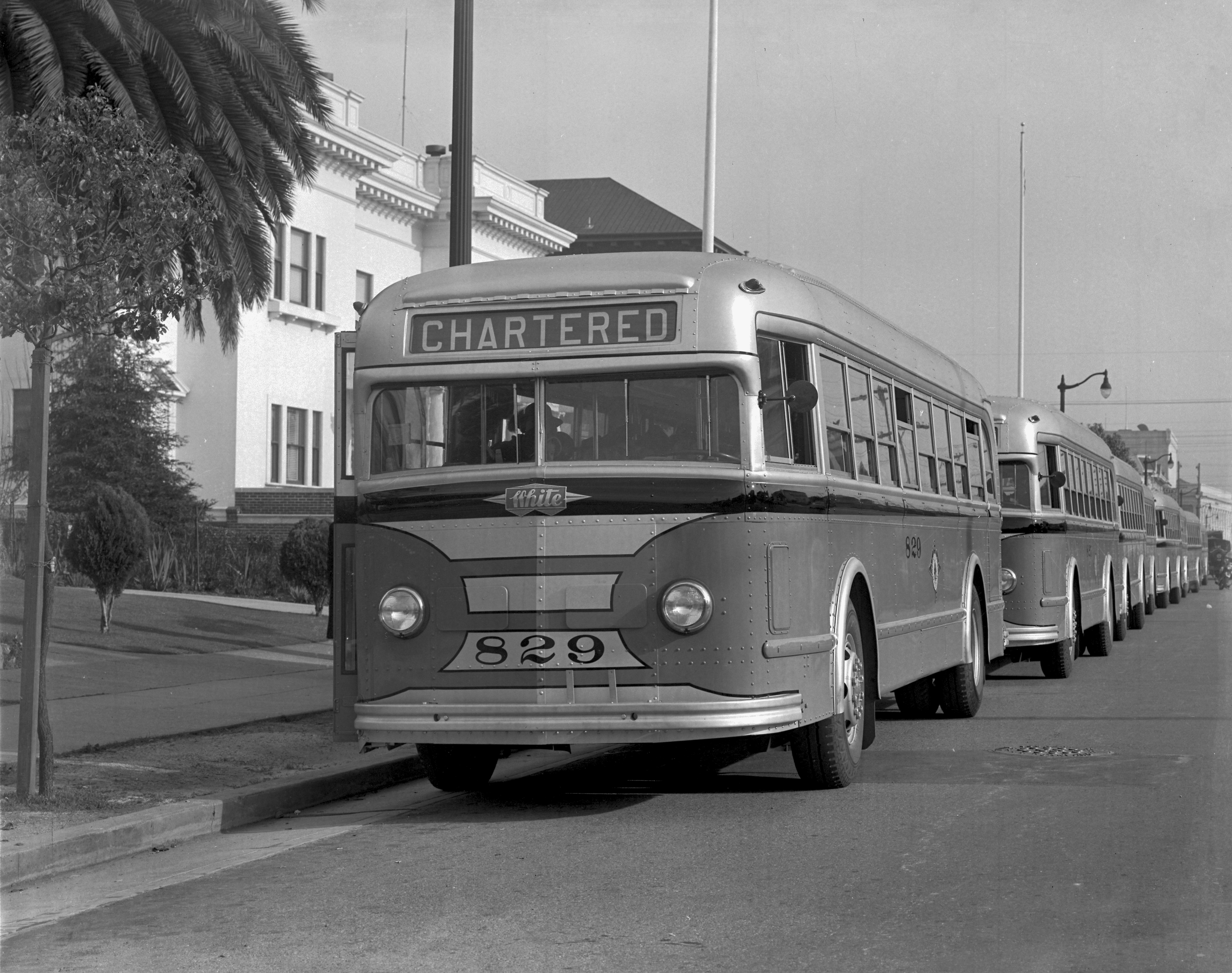
White 788 buses of Key System in Charter service.

=== Key System inheritance ===
At its inception in 1960, AC Transit purchased the mixed White, Mack, and GM "old-look" bus fleet from its predecessor, the Key System. The 249 White, Mack, and GM gasoline buses were valued at US$508,000 (equivalent to $5,529,000 in 2025) and the 276 GM diesel buses were valued at US$2,612,700 (equivalent to $28,434,000 in 2025). 189 gasoline buses manufactured by White were declared surplus in 1961 and were sold for US$60,000 (equivalent to $646,000 in 2025), and the last gasoline-powered bus ran in revenue service on July 31, 1961, although some of the newer gasoline-powered Macks were retained for lightly traveled lines. Later in 1961, AC Transit began converting 10 of the GM old-look gasoline-powered buses to diesel using secondhand transmissions and engines. The last of 26 Mack buses remaining in the fleet, #2510, ran a "farewell tour" on Line 43 in February 1965, decorated with painted tears and the message "To my friends, good-bye."

=== New Look "Transit Liners" ===
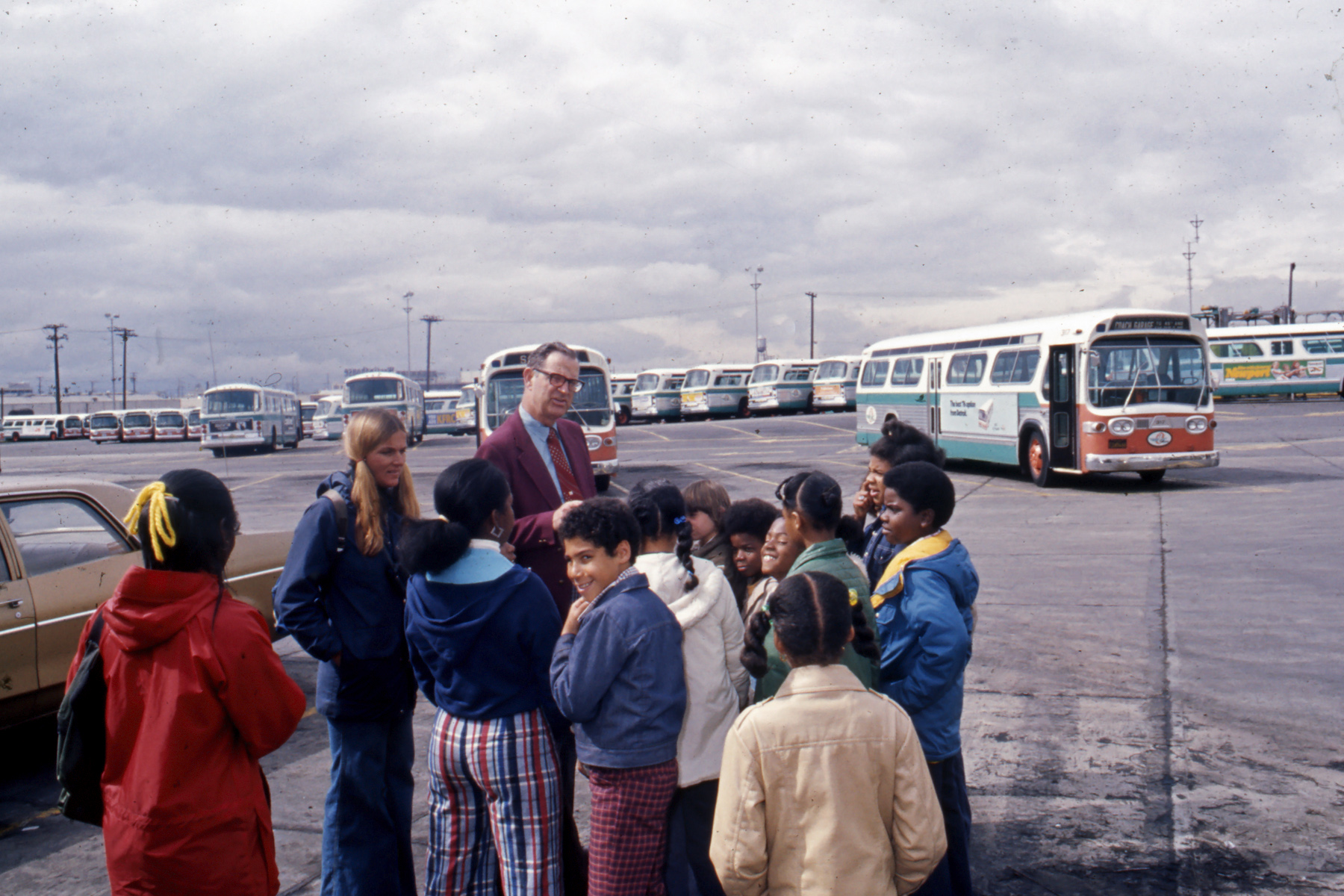
Tour of AC Transit operating division in the 1970s; GM New Looks predominant.

The first new buses ordered for AC Transit were 250 diesel GM New Look buses, which were delivered by late 1961. The cost per coach was US$34,420 (equivalent to $375,000 in 2025). During the planning stage, the District announced plans to acquire 572 of these modern "Transit Liners" at an estimated cost of US$15,500,000 (equivalent to $168,686,727 in 2025). AC Transit began New Look "Transit Liner" operation in late 1960. The New Looks were credited with turning around ridership and revenue for the District. Many were equipped with air conditioning, and these proved especially popular in that first summer of operation, when high temperatures reached 110 °F (43 °C).

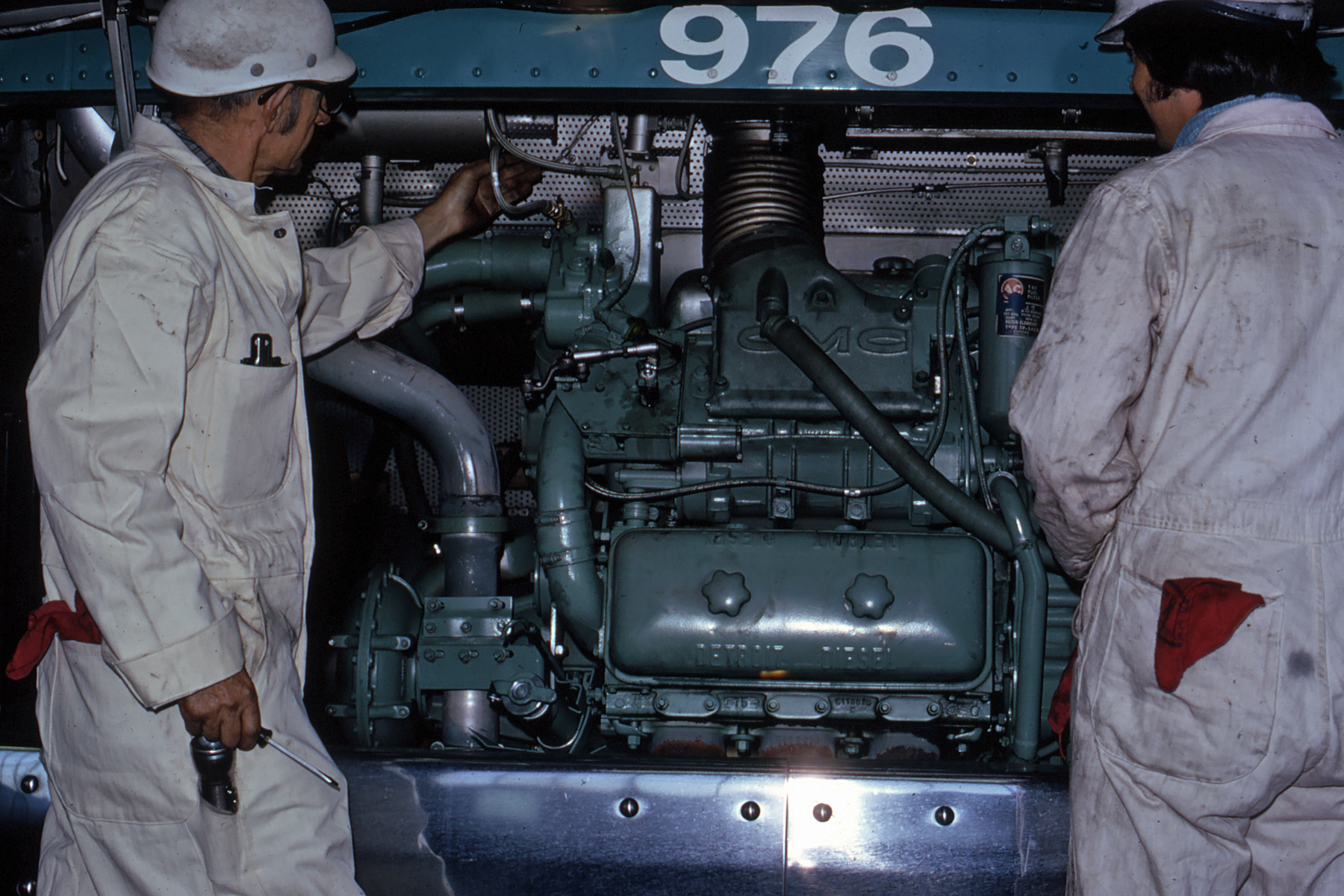
AC Transit mechanics examine the 6V71 engine of bus no. 976

AC Transit would continue to operate a mixed fleet of buses throughout the 1960s; the buses purchased from Key System started to be retired in 1969 (#1806 was the first diesel Old Look retired), but were not fully retired until 1974 with the delivery of Flxible buses. In 1969, the fleet consisted of 693 diesel-powered GM buses: 462 New Looks and 131 Old Looks. AC Transit continued purchasing exclusively GM New Look buses through the early 1970s. In 1970, AC Transit announced that it would test GM's Environment Improvement Package (EIP), an emissions control retrofit consisting of a needle injector valve, catalytic muffler, air induction system, and rubber engine mountings; the District also noted it would participate in a steam-powered bus experiment, and was willing to evaluate electric- and turbine-powered buses. The "low sac needle" injector was credited with reducing smoke by up to 93% and odors by a factor of 15. The first EIP-equipped bus was assigned fleet #902 and entered revenue service in early 1971. All the AC Transit New Look buses were fitted with the new injectors by November 1972. In 1972, with the opening of BART, the District equipped all New Look buses with a blue light next to headsigns. The blue light was illuminated with the words "TO BART" when the bus was headed towards a BART station.

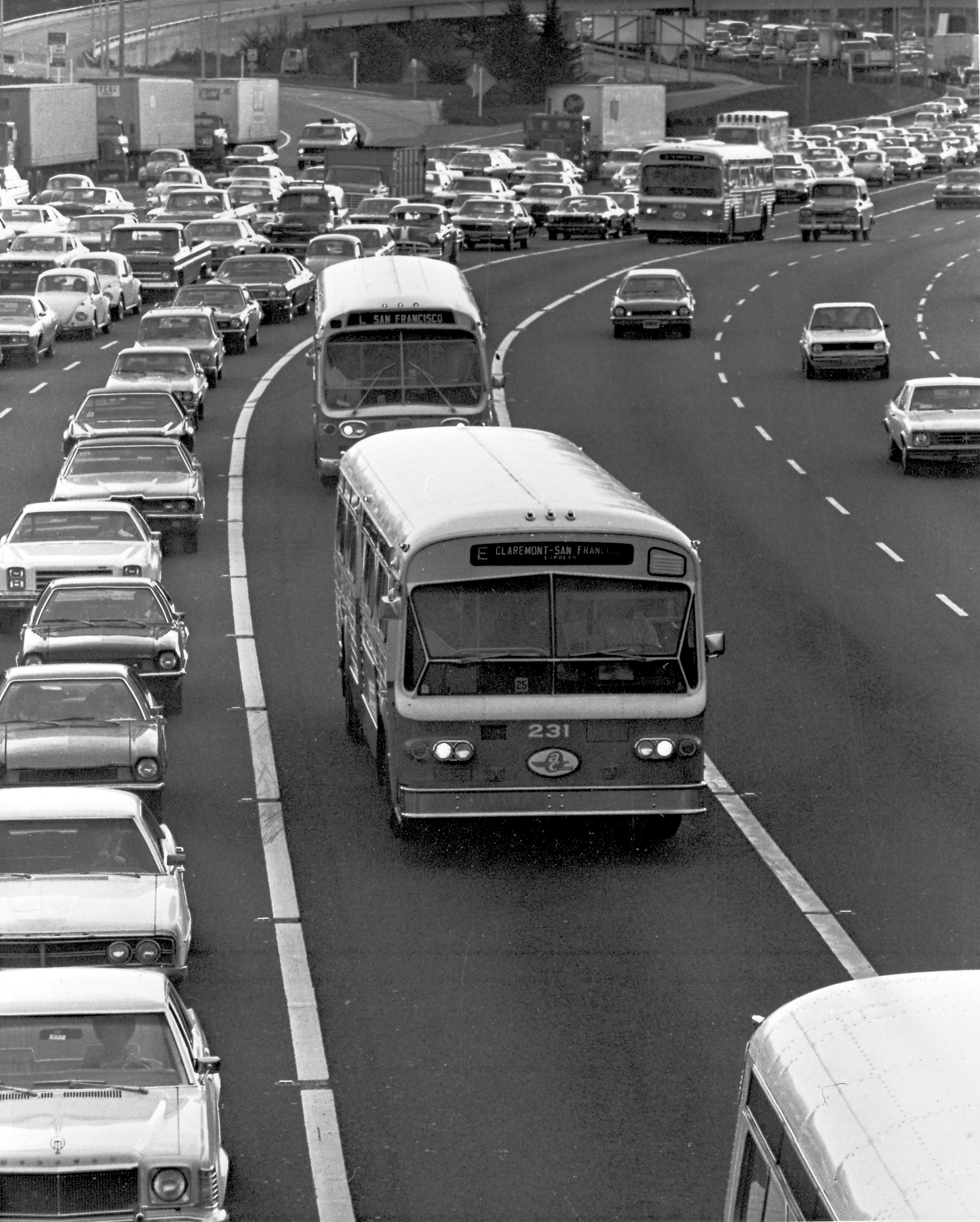
Flxible and GM New Look buses near the Bay Bridge.

In 1974, AC Transit ordered 120 Flxible New Look buses, its first purchase of new buses that had not gone to GM. Flxible had bid US$42,372 (equivalent to $277,000 in 2025) per bus in 1974, beating GM's bid of US$44,537 (equivalent to $291,000 in 2025). In 1975, a second round of bids were solicited for 36 additional "deluxe" buses with reclining seats and air conditioning, intended for a BART contract to provide extension service to suburban areas. For the 1975 orders, inflation and additional equipment greatly increased the price. Flxible submitted the winning low bid of US$71,108 (equivalent to $425,000 in 2025) per bus, beating GM's bid of US$75,144 (equivalent to $450,000 in 2025). As it turned out, AC Transit would never receive another new bus from GM. Given the rise in bus prices, rather than replace the oldest Transit Liners (received in 1960), the District spent approximately US$2,700 (equivalent to $16,000 in 2025) per coach in 1975 to add standee windows and low-back seats, extending the life of the New Look fleet.

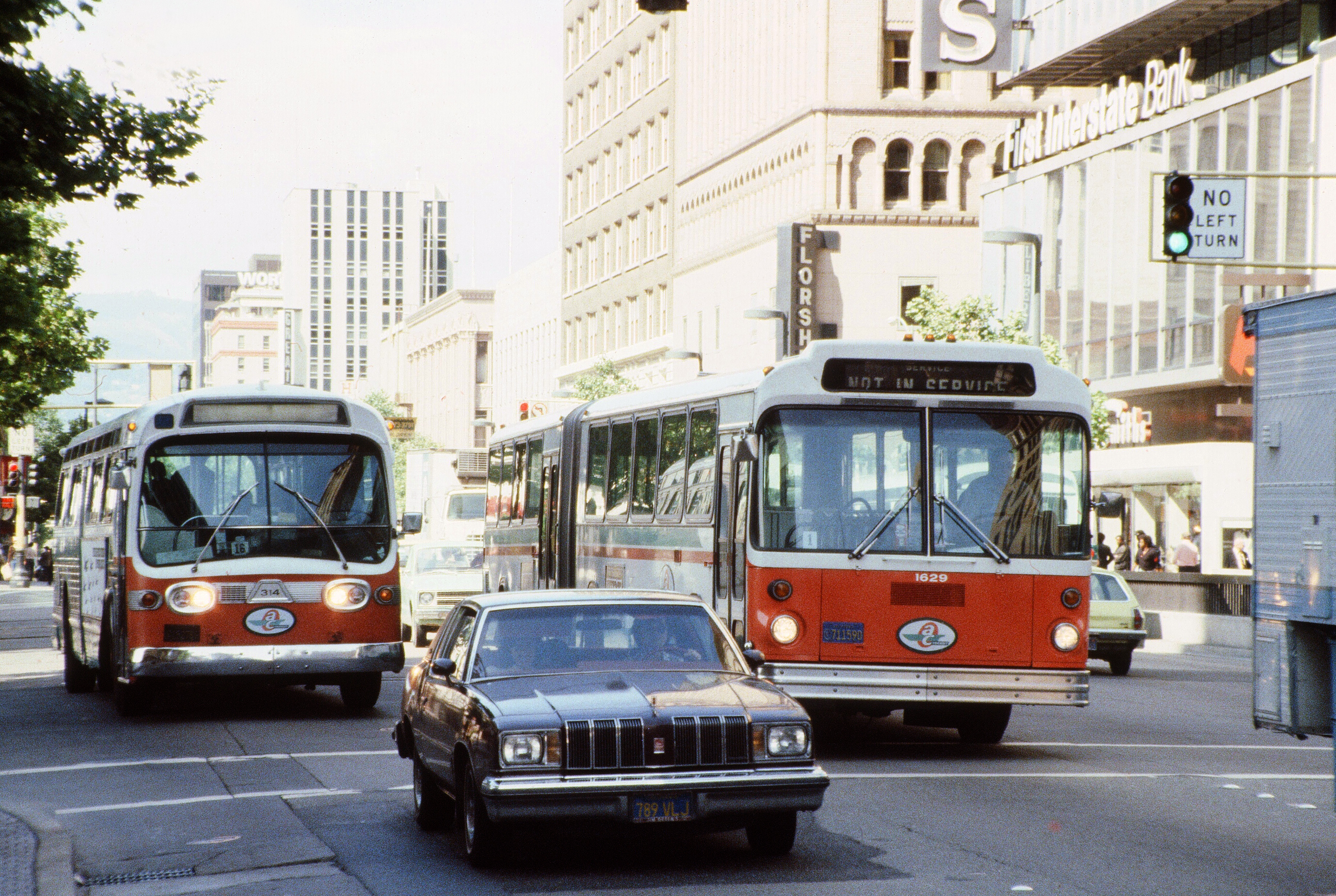
GM New Look and MAN SG 220 buses in traffic.

In August/September 1976, AC Transit was one of ten agencies to participate in a group purchase of AM General/MAN SG 220 articulated buses, part of the first widespread deployment of articulated buses in North America once the orders began to be delivered in 1978. After a fire in the Transbay Tube shut down BART service for several months starting on January 17, 1979, the AC Transit articulated buses were diverted to Transbay service.

=== "Advanced Design" and dropping GM ===
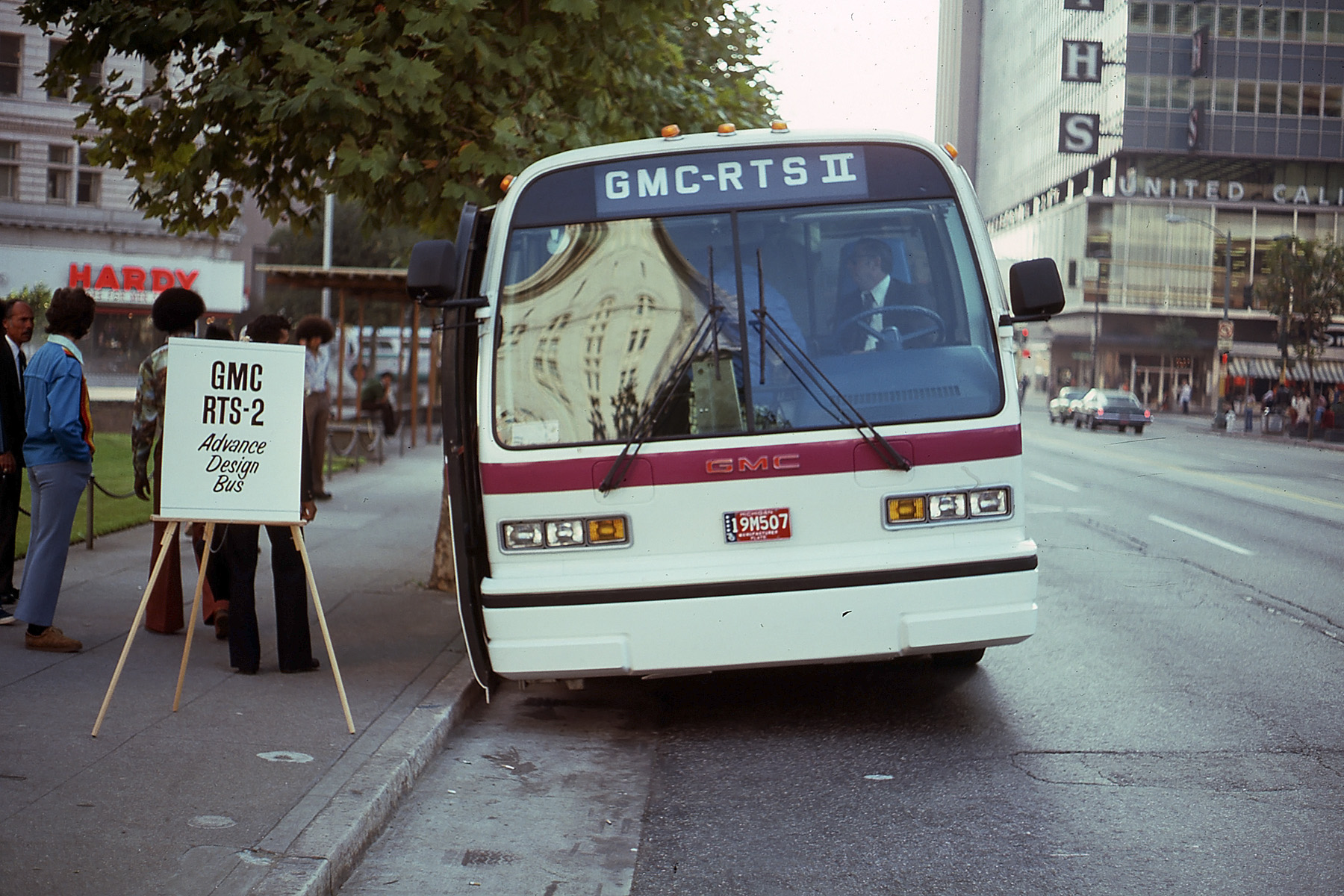
GMC RTS-II testing in Oakland, October 1976

Models of three coaches designed by GM, American Motors, and Rohr Industries for the Transbus project were shown in 1973. Although none of the Transbus project prototypes would ever go into production, AC Transit expressed an interest in acquiring the GMC RTS-II in 1975; the RTS-II "Advanced Design" coach was a direct descendant of the GM Transbus prototype. In July 1976, AC Transit released requests for bids for the next generation of buses: 66 "Advanced Design" and several smaller coaches. In September and October 1976, Flxible 870 and GMC RTS-II buses toured several East Bay cities; these "Advanced Design" coaches were being evaluated as potential replacements for the existing New Look fleet. AC Transit ordered 66 RTS-II buses in May 1977 from GM as part of a larger group purchase with five other operators. The purchase was allowed to proceed after a lawsuit by the losing bidder, AM General, was settled; the judge concluded the buses could be purchased without wheelchair lifts because of their limited reliability. The bid price was US$91,500 (equivalent to $486,000 in 2025) per coach. However, AC Transit canceled the contract in 1979, citing the high cost, which had risen to US$140,000 (equivalent to $621,000 in 2025) each, slow delivery (delivery had been expected in 1978), and fewer seats than the existing New Look buses. The District rejected several RTS buses that had already been assembled; the completed buses were later sold to the Santa Clara County Transit District.

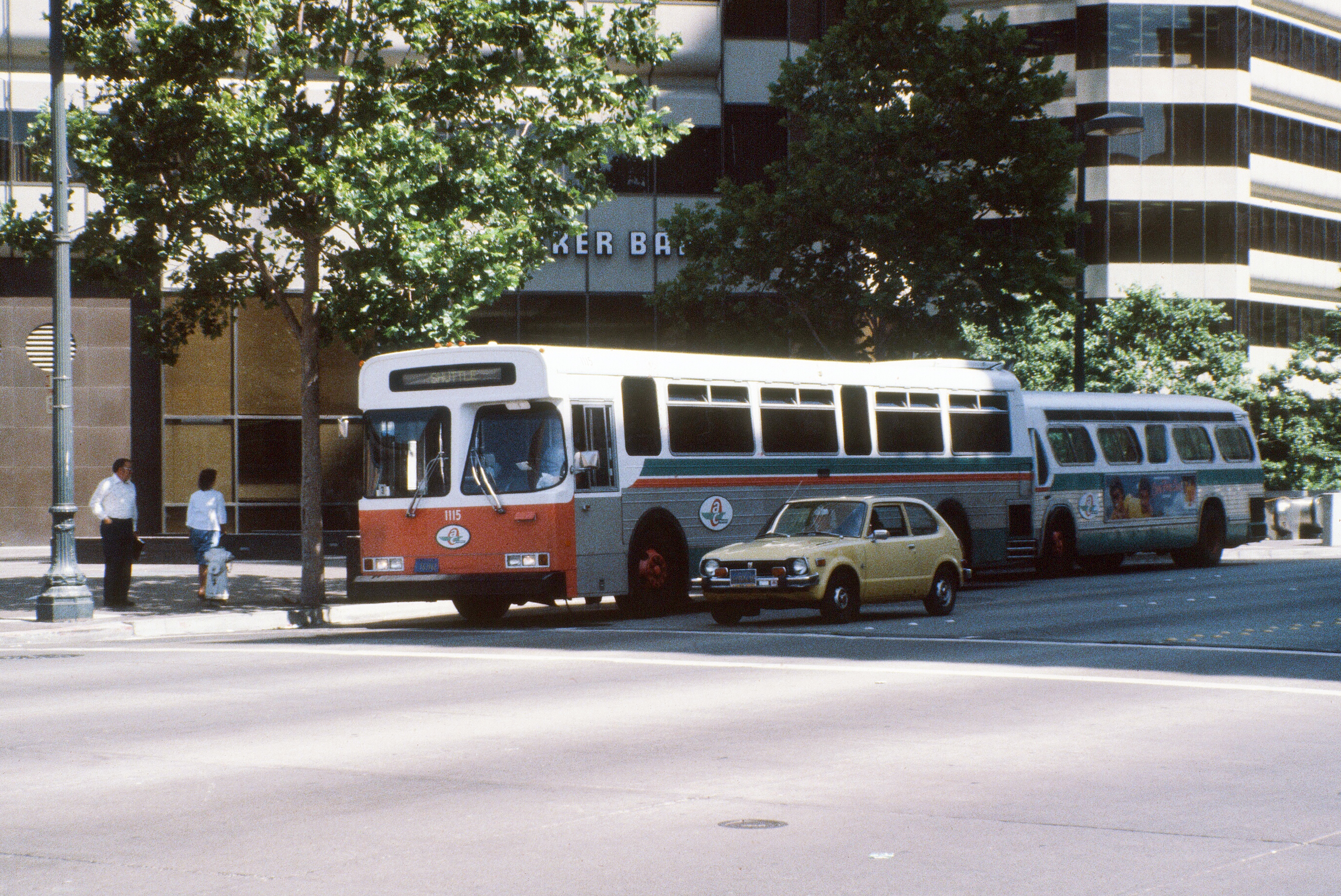
Flyer D901 and GM New Look buses of AC Transit.

Rather than pursue a set of "Advanced Design" buses, AC Transit chose to purchase buses with New Look-derived designs after the RTS contract was canceled; AC Transit ordered 175 Flyer D901 buses in 35 and 40 ft (11 and 12 m) lengths. The per-unit cost was US$118,500 (equivalent to $526,000 in 2025) for a 40-ft coach. The Flyer D901 fleet were the first AC Transit buses to be equipped with electronic route signs, along with kneeling suspension and a wheelchair lift. 15 more Flyer D901s were added in 1982.

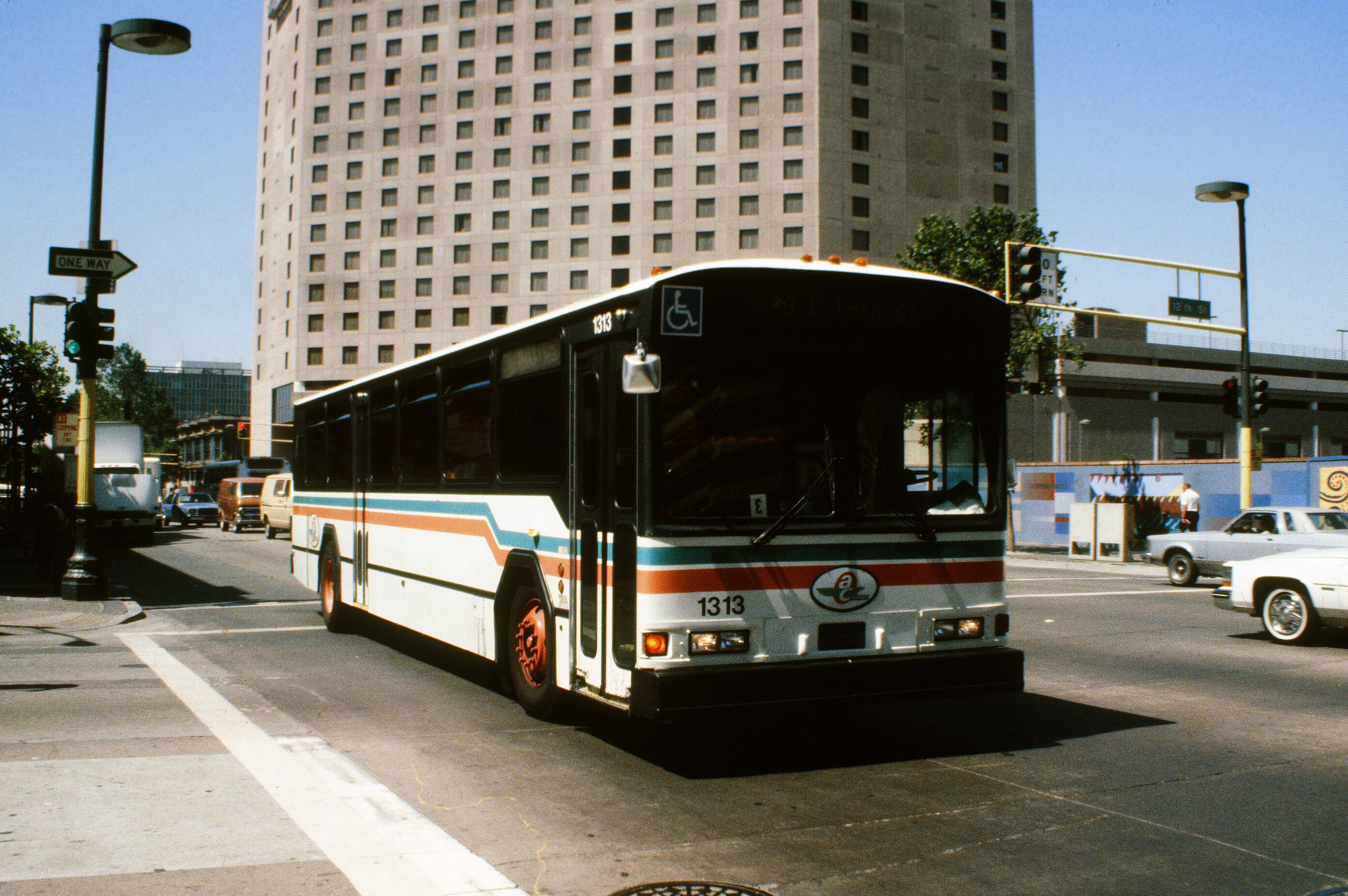
#1313, part of the first group of Gillig Phantoms.

By 1981, the District was once again soliciting bids for 60 "Advanced Design" buses; although the original "Transit Liner" New Looks delivered in 1960 were being replaced by the Flyer D901s, some of the Transit Liners still remained in service. In 1982, AC Transit ordered 141 buses from Gillig and 60 from Neoplan; the Gillig Phantom buses were updated New Look designs, while the Neoplan AN440 "Transliner" coaches were true "Advanced Design" buses. The first Gillig, a 40-ft Phantom, arrived on site for testing in June 1982, and AC Transit would place another order with Gillig for 134 additional coaches in 1983, at a cost of US$144,512 (equivalent to $467,000 in 2025) each. With the Gilligs, AC Transit updated its livery from the "clownface" design first applied to the Transit Liners in 1960. The Neoplans were delivered in August and September 1982.

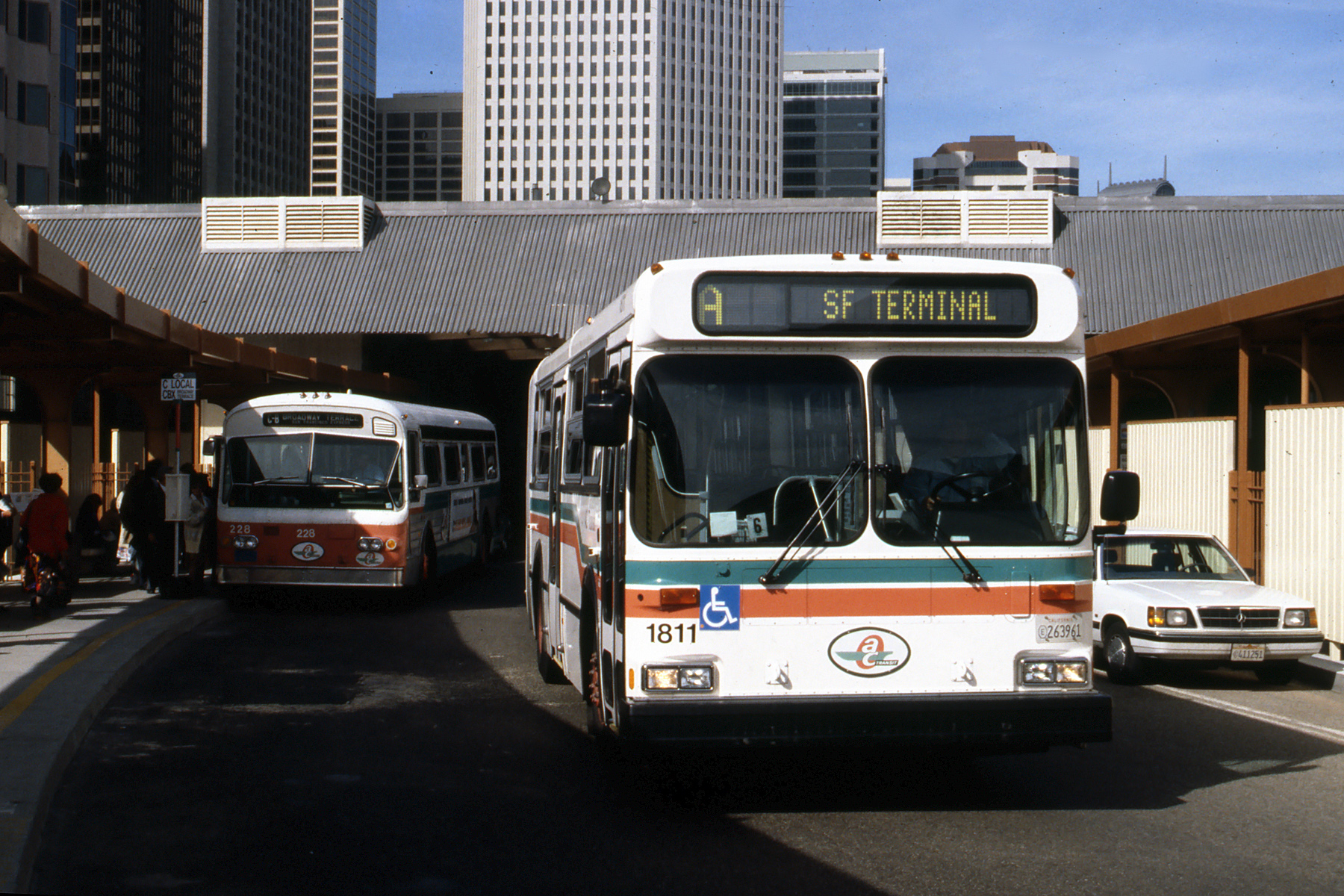
Flxible New Look and New Flyer D60HF at Transbay Terminal

AC Transit ordered 56 New Flyer D35HF and D40HF coaches in 1988 at an average cost of US$157,000 (equivalent to $427,000 in 2025) each to replace some of the oldest GM New Looks. The New Flyers were assembled in the local Union City plant. The District added 52 more 40-foot D40HF coaches and purchased 30 D60HF buses to add to the articulated fleet in 1989; the new D60HFs replaced 30 older articulated buses that had been temporarily leased from Santa Clara County Transit District. Additional orders of Gillig Phantoms followed in the early 1990s, and a second round of 30 New Flyer D60HFs delivered in 1996 allowed AC Transit to retire the original AM General/MAN articulated buses.

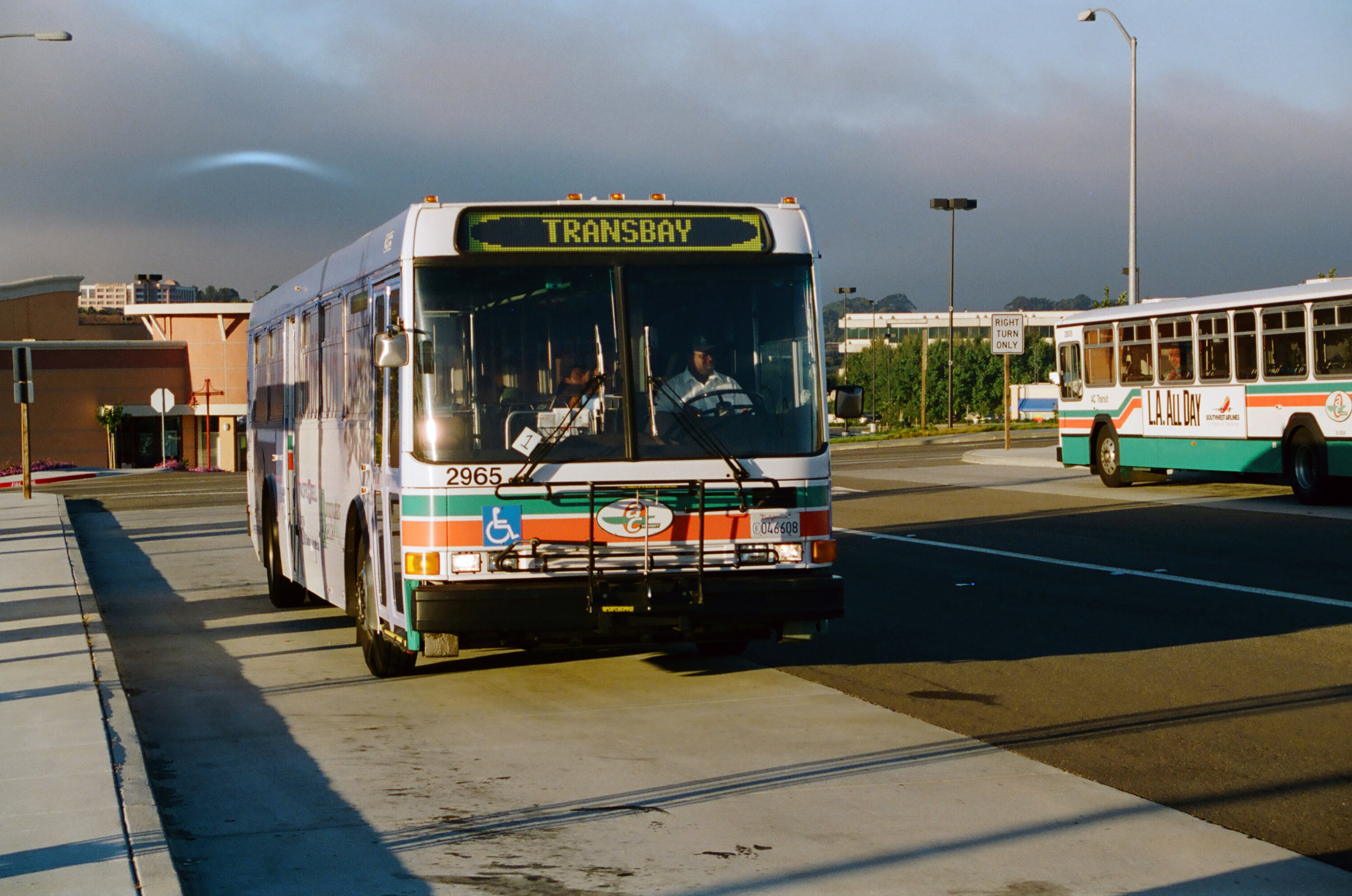
#2965, NABI 416

Starting in 1996, AC Transit added 204 Model 416 40-foot high-floor buses from North American Bus Industries (NABI). The 416 was originally introduced in 1989 by American Ikarus as a domestic variant of the Ikarus 415 before the company was spun off in 1996 as NABI.

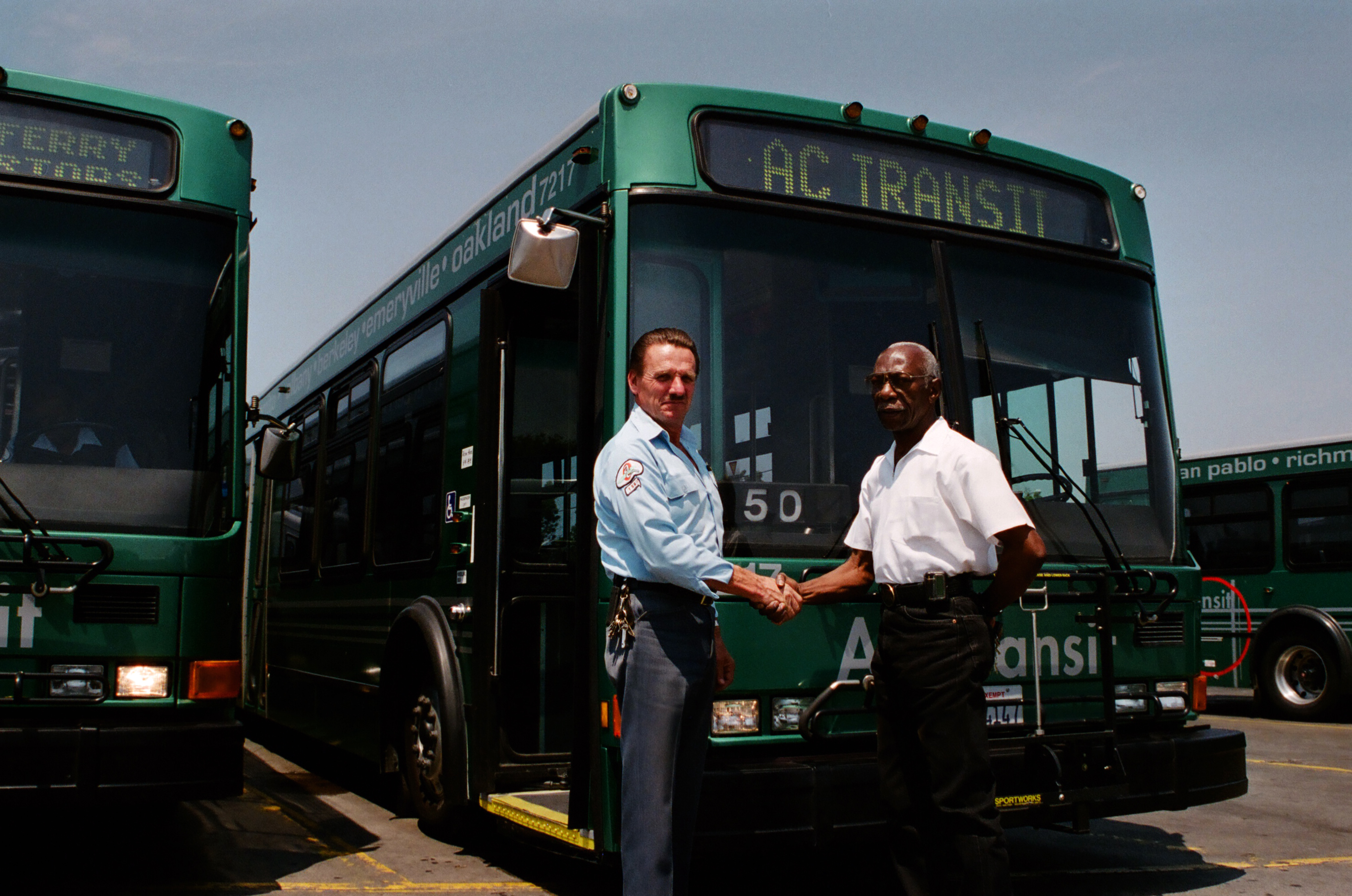
#7217, NABI 40-LFW for Transbay service

AC Transit rolled out its first low-floor buses in 2000, when it received 44 NABI 40-LFW (040.70) coaches; a subsequent procurement of 40 low-floor coaches was originally awarded to Orion Bus Industries. The unit price was estimated at US$270,500 (equivalent to $492,000 in 2025), but during the course of negotiations, Orion insisted on using its own accessibility ramp rather than AC Transit's preferred vendor, and the per-unit price rose to US$308,000 (equivalent to $551,000 in 2025). These factors tipped the award to NABI, and a second round of 40-LFW buses was procured instead.

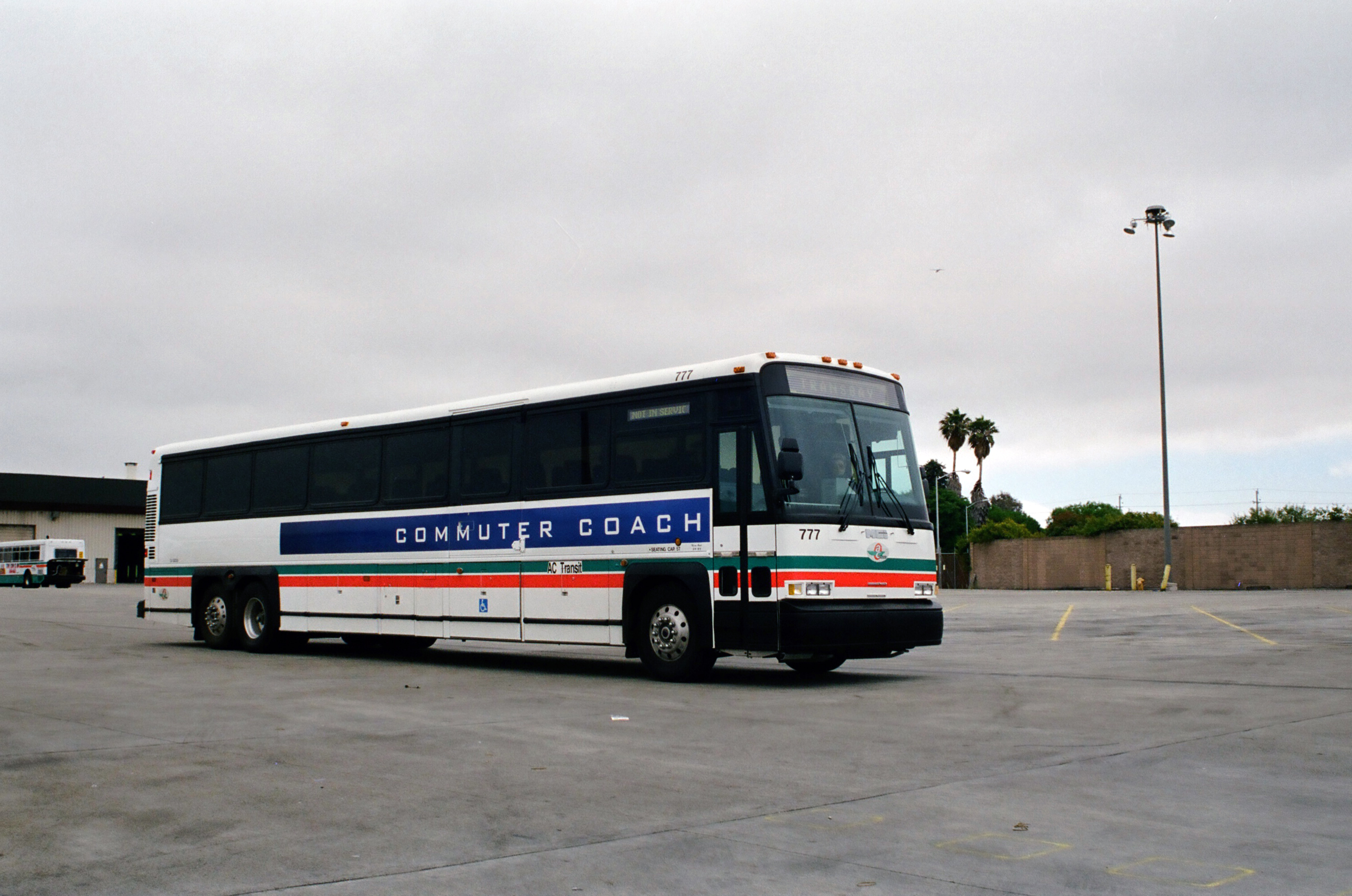
A suburban MCI coach was tested by AC Transit prior to entering widespread service.

Also in 2000, AC Transit began operating a fleet of 45-foot over-the-road (suburban) coaches purchased from Motor Coach Industries beginning in the early 2000s.

=== Van Hool ===
In 2003, AC Transit began purchasing low-floor buses from Van Hool. The Van Hool buses were assembled in Belgium and featured low floors and three doors (four doors on articulated models), which AC Transit touted as the key to bus rapid transit service between Berkeley and San Leandro along Shattuck, Telegraph, International Blvd, and East 14th Street.

After receiving criticism for the use of federal funds to purchase foreign-made Van Hool buses and tailored specification requirements to exclude domestic manufacturers, AC Transit ordered locally-built Gillig buses in 2012. In March 2013, AC Transit began operating the first of its new Gillig buses. In August of the same year, AC Transit placed the first of its new New Flyer Xcelsior articulated buses into service. Later that year, in November 2013, new Gillig buses with a suburban seating configuration and Transbay branding were introduced into service.

All AC Transit buses are wheelchair accessible and have front-mounted bicycle racks. The MCI buses also feature luggage bay bicycle racks. AC Transit buses purchased after 2007 have air conditioning, as approved by the board of directors.

== Special types ==
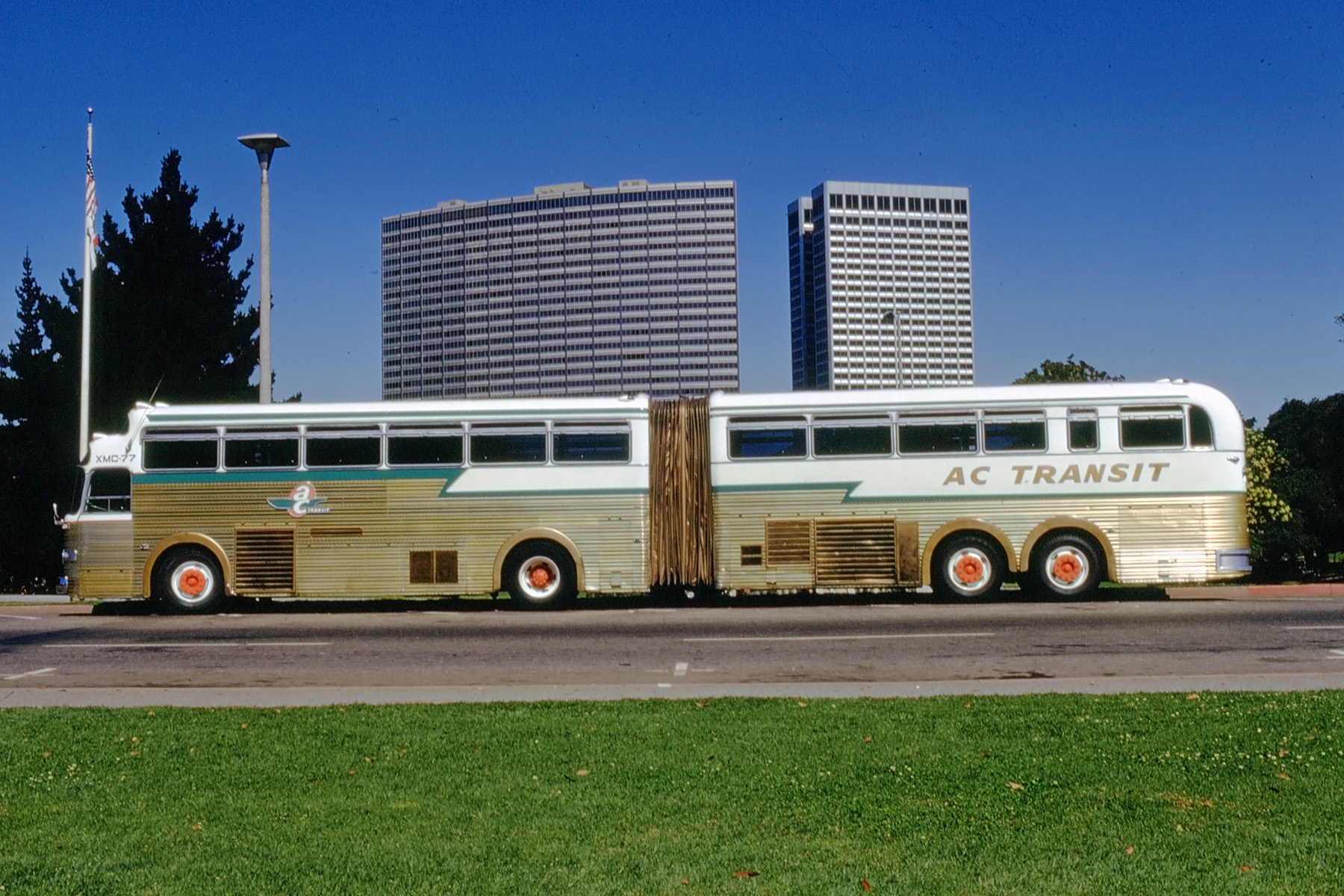
AC Transit XMC-77, the "Freeway Train" (c.1966)

=== Articulated buses ===
AC Transit pioneered the use of articulated buses in the United States; in March 1966 it was the first transit agency to use the Super Golden Eagle long-distance coach (one of five originally designed and built for Continental Trailways; AC Transit designated it XMC-77 and called it the "Freeway Train"), primarily on Transbay service.

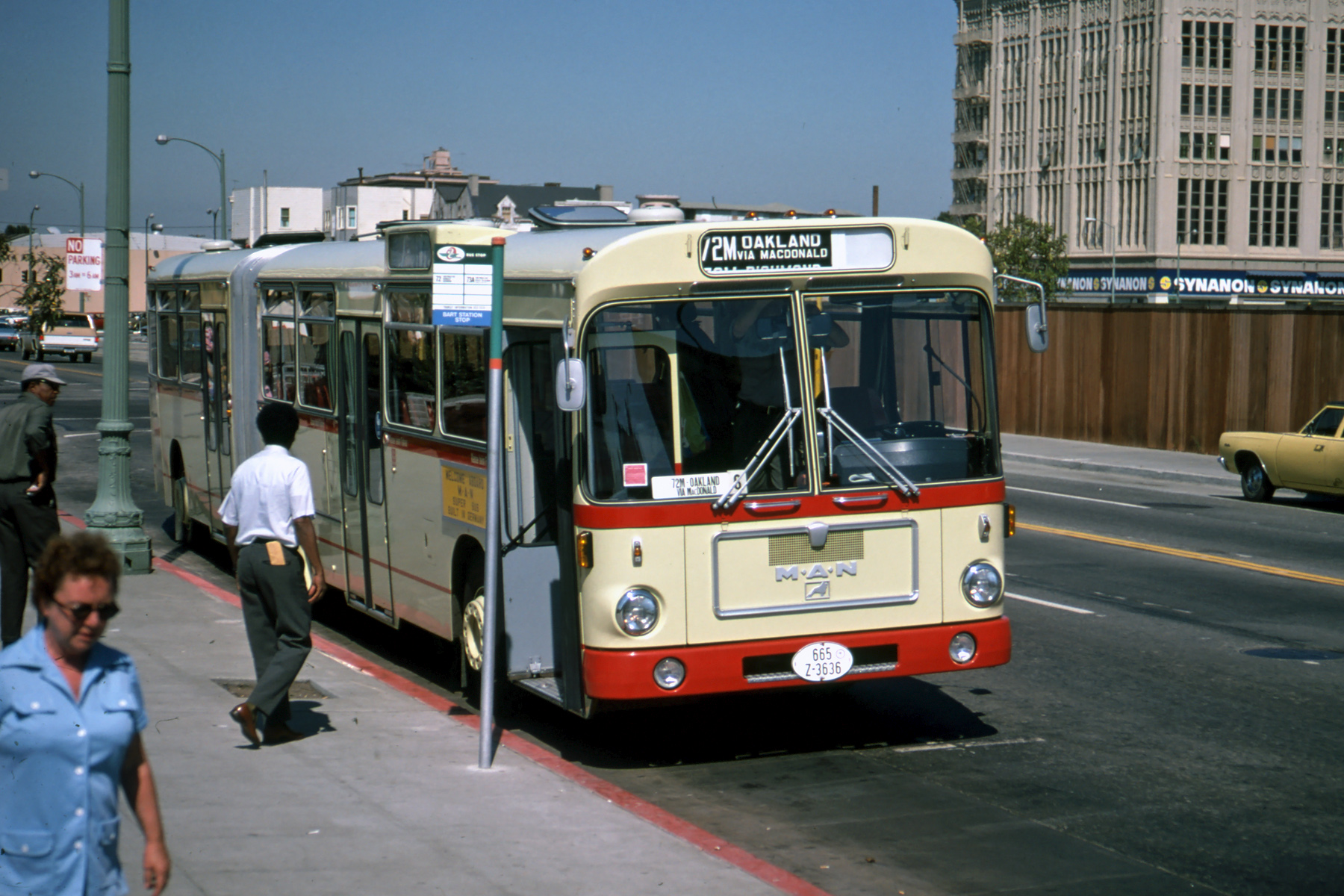
MAN SG 192 articulated bus during 1974 testing

By 1970, AC Transit was one of six agencies to participate in a "super bus project" coordinated by the National Transportation Center (Pittsburgh) to write a specification for a higher-capacity bus; once the specification had been written, two prototypes would be built and tested to select a winner for a large group procurement of 100 buses to keep per-unit costs low. Two European-built articulated buses were tested in the summer of 1974: a Volvo B58, and a MAN SG 192. Riders received the M.A.N. bus favorably, and the specification was released for bid in 1975; AC Transit placed an order for 30 MAN SG 220 buses in 1976 and deliveries began from the AM General/M.A.N. joint venture in 1978.

=== Steam power ===
In 1969, AC Transit received a grant and converted bus #666 to steam power, which ran in revenue service between 1971 and 1972. The propulsion system was designed by William Brobeck, who had previously worked on the Bevatron. #666 used a triple-expansion closed-loop reciprocating steam engine; power was improved compared to the original six-cylinder Detroit Diesel 6V71 engine and emissions were reduced, but fuel consumption was higher than a conventional diesel bus. Exhaust steam is condensed and returned to the steam generator, which is an externally-fired boiler that uses 1,400 feet (430 m) of coiled steel tubing, generating steam at 850 °F (454 °C) and 800 psi (5,500 kPa). Prior to entering service, the steam bus was exhibited in Washington DC and to the public. Bus #666 completed 3,403 miles (5,477 km) in revenue service when the trial ended in September 1972, and the diesel engine was subsequently reinstalled on the bus.

=== Hydrogen fuel cell ===
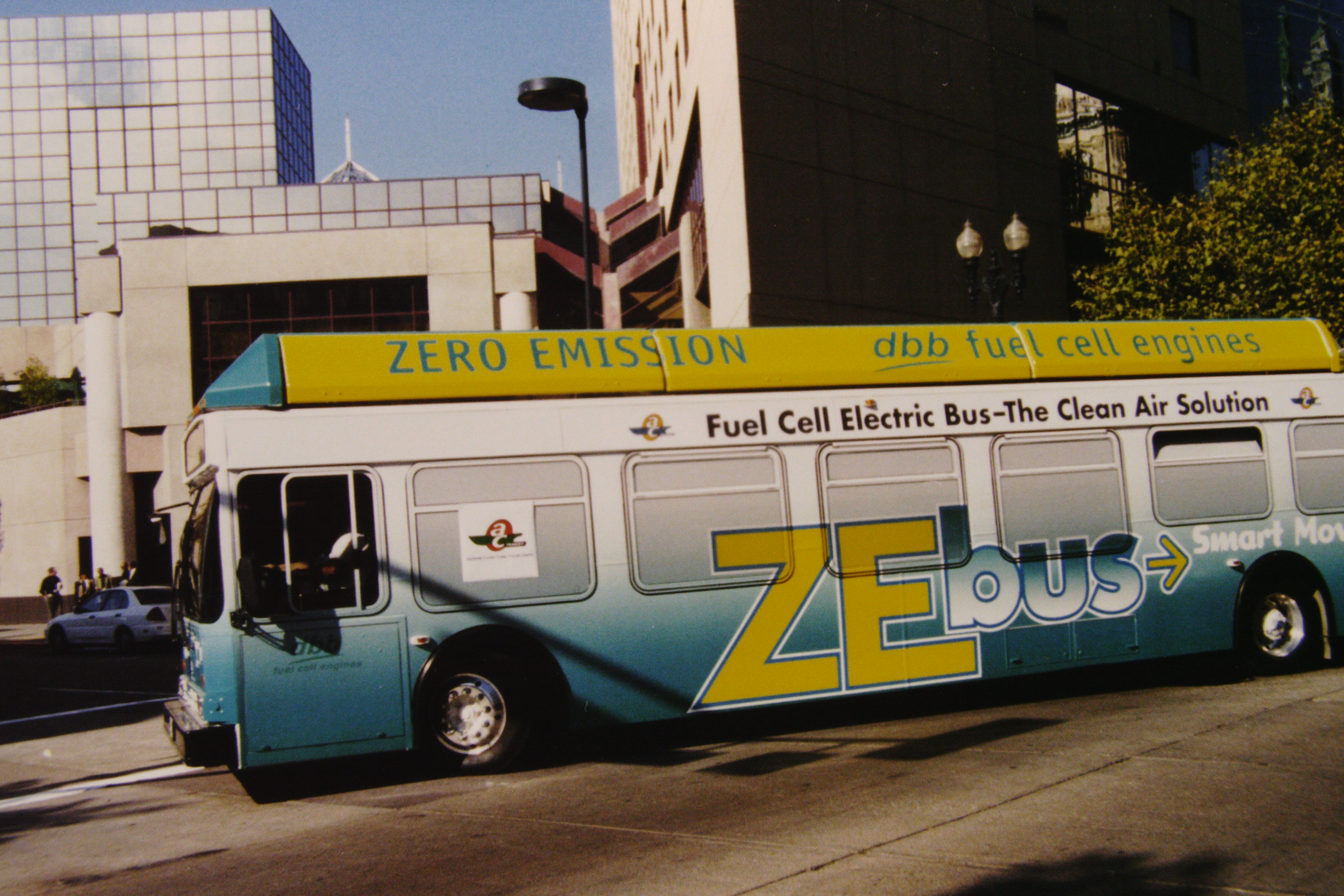
ZEbus during testing (1999)

The District began the HyRoad program in 1999 and tested several hydrogen fuel cell-powered buses, including the Ballard/XCELLSiS ZEbus (a New Flyer F40LF fitted with a Ballard fuel cell) in November 1999 for one week. The ZEbus would go on to be tested by the SunLine Transit Agency for a year in 2000. AC Transit also tested the ThunderPower bus in 2003 and 2004. ThunderPower was based on an ElDorado National EZ Rider 2 chassis, equipped with the Siemens ELFA series hybrid drive train. A 60 kW fuel cell supplied by UTC Power provided electricity to two 85 kW (114 hp) traction motors whose output was integrated and sent to the rear axle; excess electricity was stored on board in two battery modules, with 48 12-volt lead-acid batteries in total. 25 kg (55 lb) of hydrogen was stored in nine tanks pressurized to 3,600 psi (25 MPa).

The next phase of the HyRoad program was stymied when AC Transit attempted to procure a fuel cell bus in 2000: only one vendor provided a bid, but it was later withdrawn. The District eventually found a willing vendor in Van Hool, based on the A330 chassis, with fuel cell integration to be performed by ISE Corp. and UTC Power; the order comprised four buses: three for AC Transit and one for SunLine. The three "first-generation" fuel cell buses were delivered to AC Transit in October and December 2005 at a cost of US$3,200,000 (equivalent to $5,280,000 in 2025) each, approximately ten times the cost of an equivalent diesel bus. Each fuel cell bus was each approximately 8,000 lb (3,600 kg) heavier than a diesel equivalent. They would be evaluated under the Federal Transit Administration's National Fuel Cell Bus Program, and were operated in revenue service from March 20, 2006, to 2010.

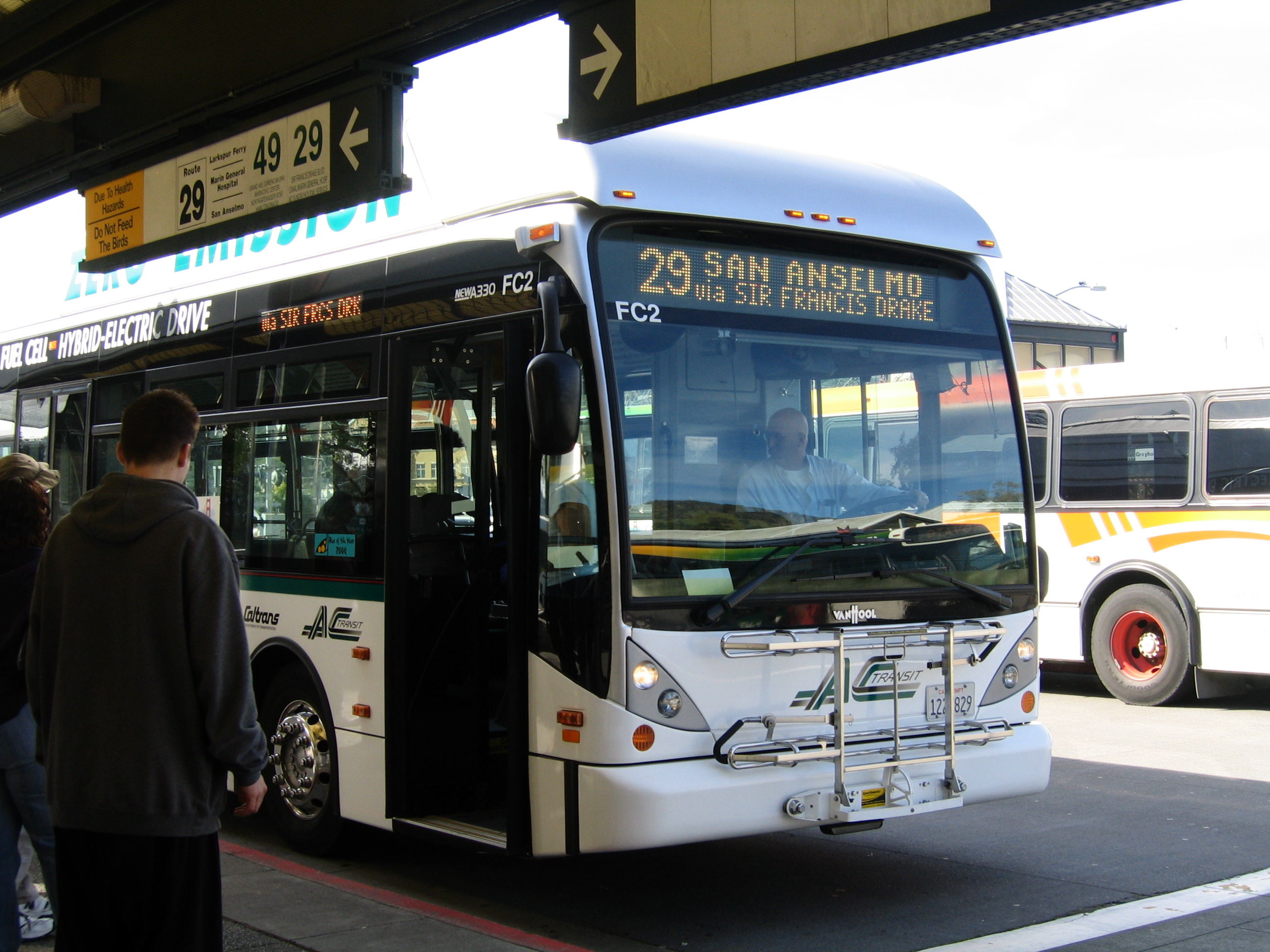
FC2 in revenue service with Golden Gate Transit, February 2008

These three "first-generation" buses, numbered FC1 through FC3, used a series hybrid powertrain, equipped with two electric traction motors with 170 kW (230 hp) of total power, drawing from a fuel cell that could supply 120 kW and a three-cell (wired in parallel) traction battery system with 53 kWh (190 MJ) of storage, using sodium/nickel chloride chemistry. Each bus had an on-board capacity for 50 kg (110 lb) of hydrogen in eight roof-mounted tanks pressurized to 5,000 psi (34 MPa). The chassis was purpose-designed to accommodate fuel cell and electric traction motor components.

The first AC Transit hydrogen station was installed at Richmond (Division 3) in 2002, producing hydrogen through the electrolysis of water. Another hydrogen fueling station was installed at East Oakland (Division 4) by Chevron on March 13, 2006, using a methane reformer, and it was planned to be decommissioned in September 2010 after a new station opened at Emeryville (Division 2).

Between 2003 and 2018, AC Transit zero-emissions buses traveled more than 3,200,000 miles (5,100,000 km) in revenue service. One of the fuel cell buses (FC2) operated in revenue service for Golden Gate Transit for one month in 2008 and again briefly in 2009. The "first-generation" FC1–FC3 were compared with six diesel Van Hool A330 buses as a baseline; while the fuel cell buses demonstrated better fuel economy at 6.79 mpg_{‑US} (0.346 L/km) (diesel gallon equivalent) compared to 4.20 mpg_{‑US} (0.560 L/km), the diesel buses were more reliable, averaging 4,299 miles (6,919 km) between roadcalls for all causes, compared to 1,185 miles (1,907 km) between roadcalls for the fuel cell buses. The fleet of three buses achieved an aggregate availability of 61%, short of the 85% target; however, this was driven mainly by the main traction batteries, which accounted for 36% of all unavailable days. The period of evaluation varied by bus, as each bus required the cell stack assemblies to be replaced at various points in 2008.

AC Transit is the lead agency of Zero Emission Bay Area (ZEBA), a consortium of five Bay Area transit agencies (AC Transit, Golden Gate Transit, SFMTA, SamTrans, and VTA) demonstrating fuel cell buses. Under ZEBA, AC Transit took delivery of 12 additional "second-generation" fuel cell buses, based on the Van Hool A300L and numbered FC4 to FC15, in 2011. The fuel cell and propulsion systems were planned to be transferred from FC1–FC3 to the first three of the third-generation buses. Compared to FC1–FC3, the second-generation 300L-based FC4–FC16 are 5,000 pounds (2,300 kg) lighter and use lithium-ion batteries from EnerDel, albeit at a reduced capacity of 21 kWh (76 MJ). Fuel cell power remains at 120 kW, and hydrogen storage was reduced to 40 kg (88 lb). A 13th fuel cell bus was acquired at a nominal cost, and the 14th fuel cell bus was the first 60-foot articulated New Flyer fuel cell bus built, originally ordered by Connecticut Transit.

A "third-generation" fleet of fuel cell and battery-electric buses based on the New Flyer Xcelsior (XE40 and XHE40, respectively) were delivered in 2019 for a direct comparison of the two zero-emissions technologies in revenue service. With the state's mandate to move to a completely zero-emissions fleet by 2040, the District will use the results of the comparison to determine the optimum mix of bus propulsion technologies.

== Livery ==
By September 1960, AC Transit had selected the "wing" logo along with a color palette that included silver, "Tahoe turquoise", "Monterey cypress green", and "persimmon orange." The buses purchased from Key System were repainted from their original "fruit salad" colors to the "clownface" livery in 1960 and 1961, featuring a predominantly white (upper half) and orange (lower front) color scheme with green side stripes, matching the newly delivered New Looks. The exterior design won a national award from Fleet Owner magazine in October 1961. AC Transit retained the "clownface" livery for new orders through the Flyer D901s ordered in 1979.

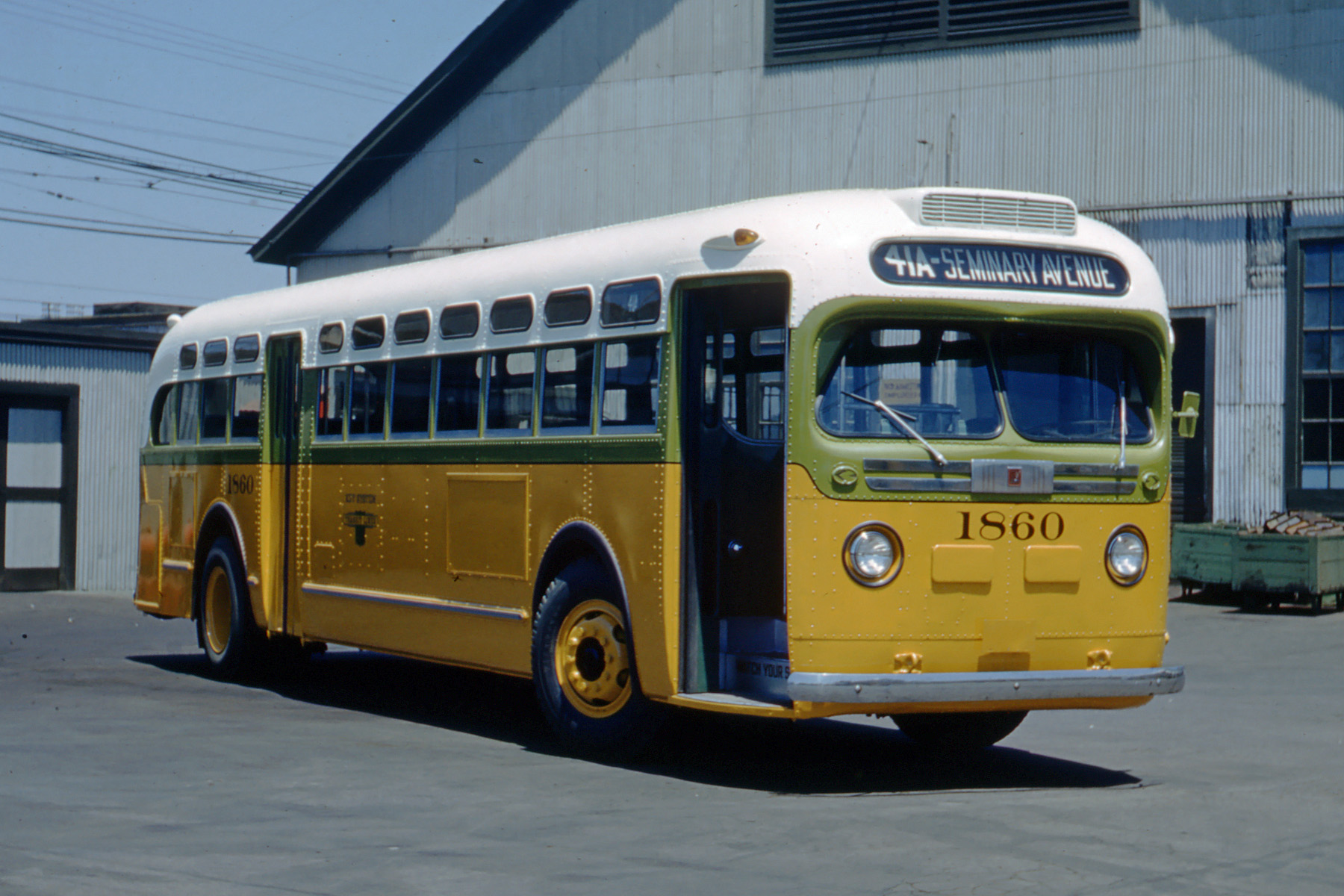
Key System #1860 with legacy "fruit salad" livery

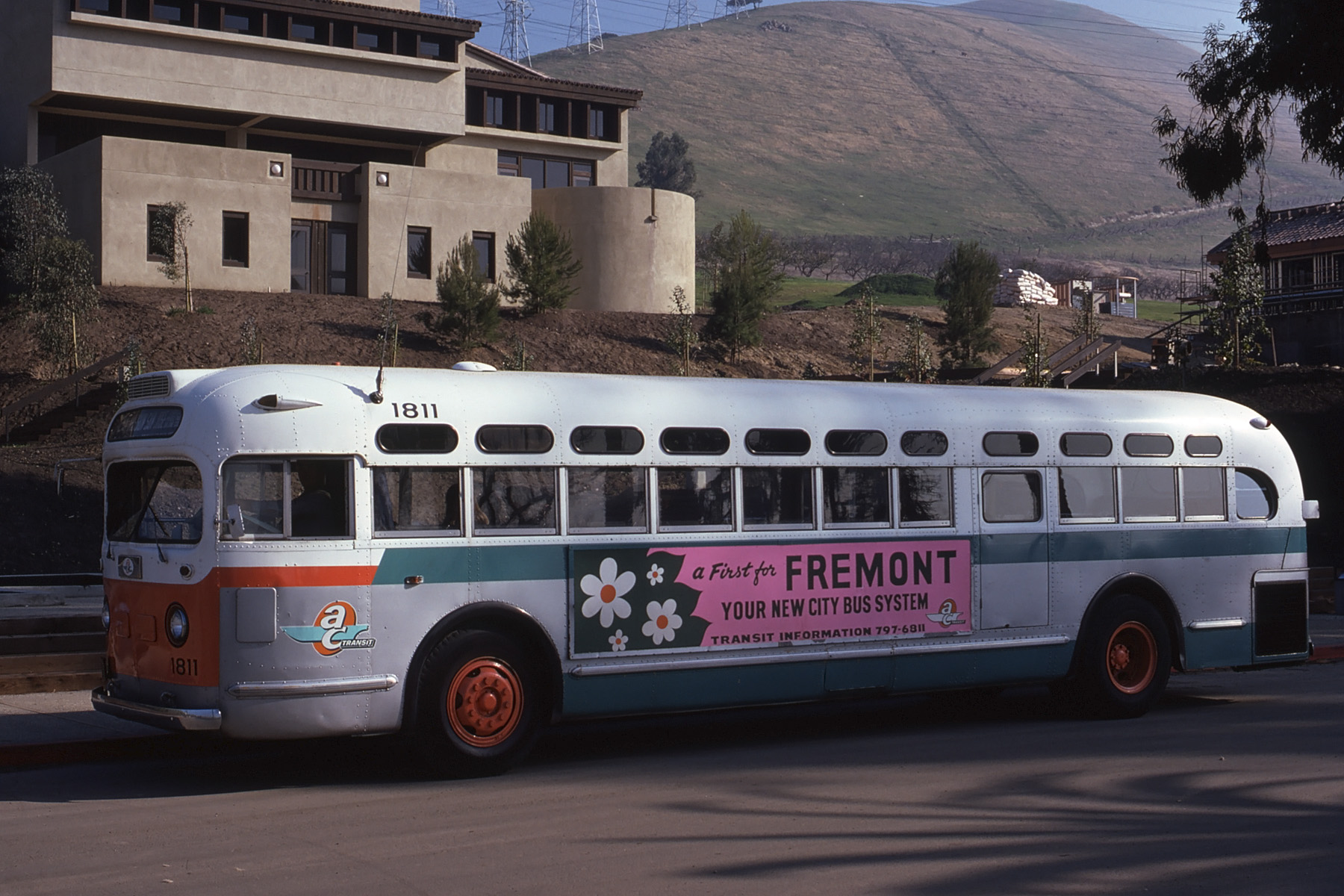
AC Transit #1811 purchased from Key System, repainted in "clownface" white/orange/green livery with turquoise/orange wing logo

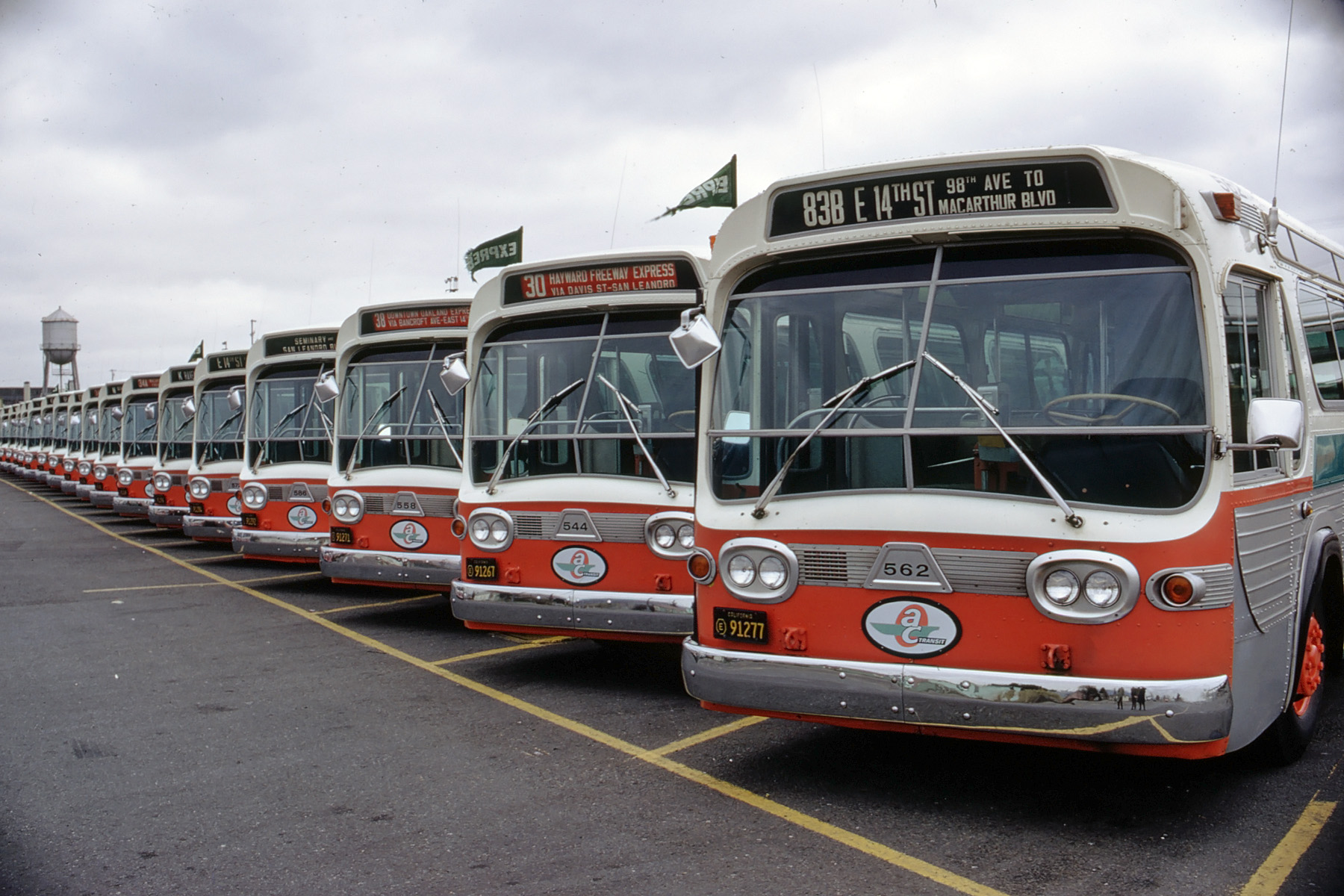
AC Transit first-generation (TDH-5301) 40-ft GM New Look bus fleet in "clownface" with wing logo

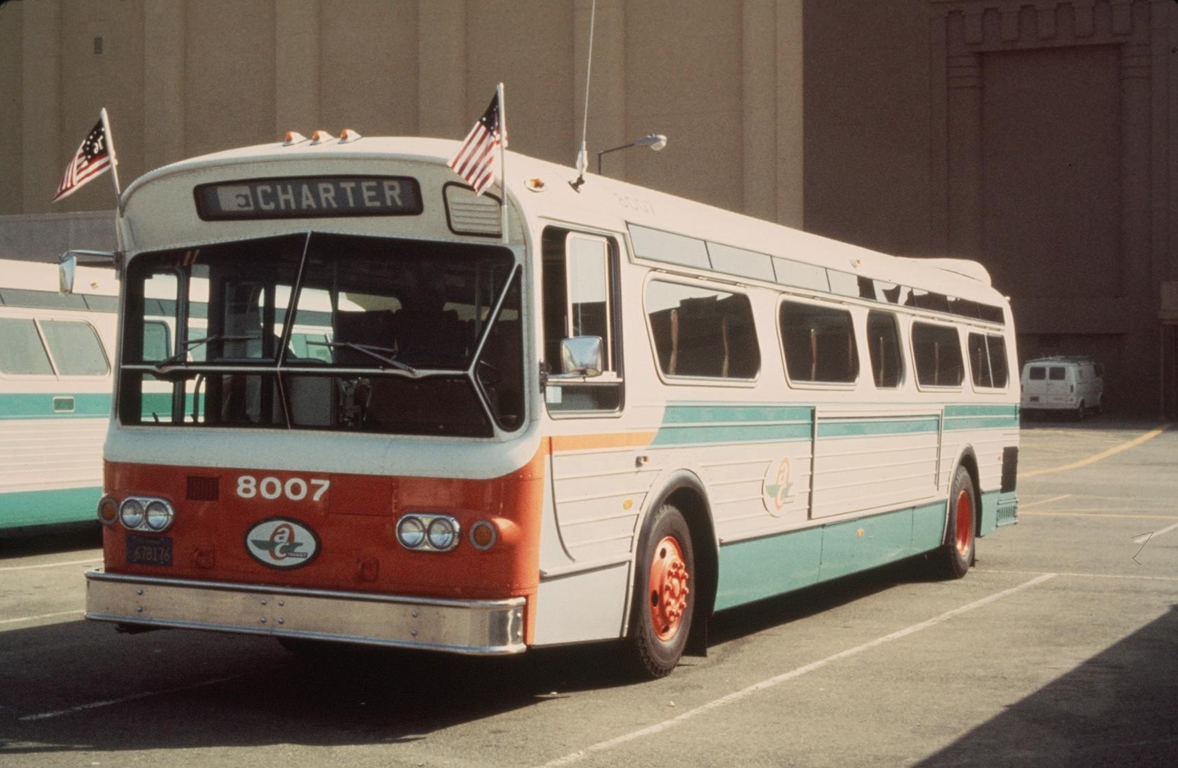
Flxible New Look in "clownface" livery

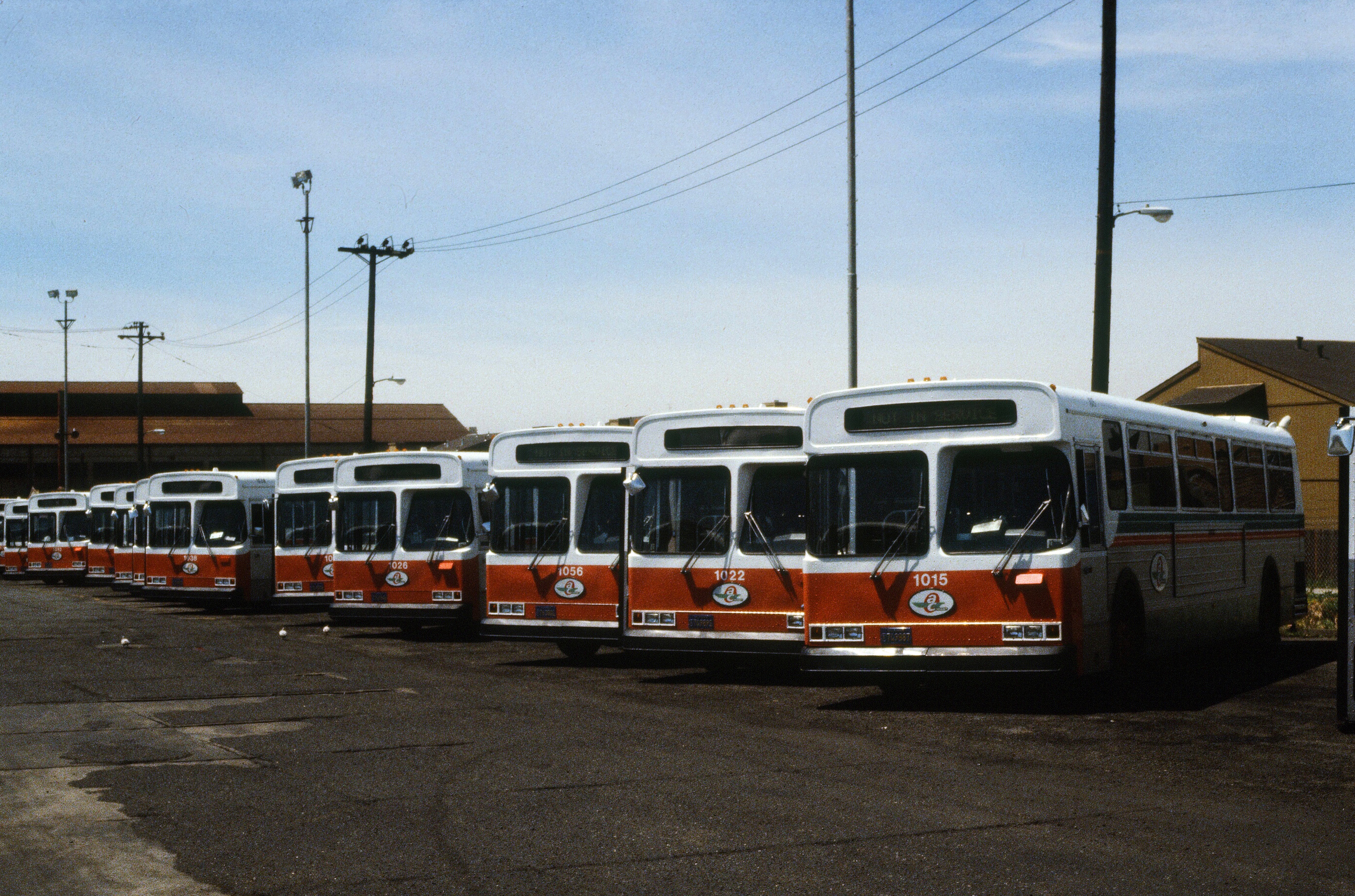
Flyer D901 fleet in "clownface" livery

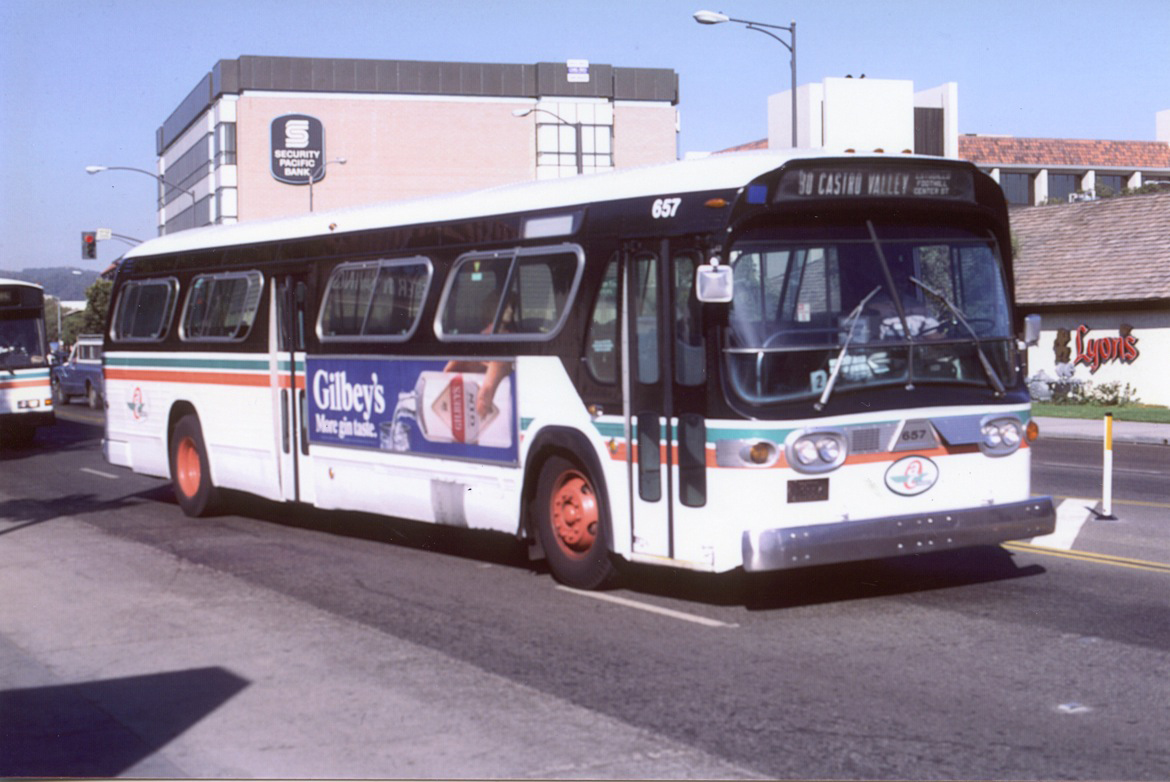
GM New Look repainted in "stripe" livery

The Gillig Phantoms and Neoplan AN440s ordered by AC Transit in 1982 were delivered with a more subtle "stripe" livery featuring the same three-color palette as the previous clownface livery. Some buses received a variant of the stripe livery, but the majority of new buses for the District bore the stripe livery, featuring orange and green horizontal stripes on predominantly white coaches. The wheels also lost their signature persimmon orange color with later orders. In the early 1990s, at least one bus (#1422) was painted as a test in a modified clownface livery featuring orange (bottom front) and green (top half) separated by a thin white stripe.

In 2003, AC Transit rolled out an updated "ribbon" livery and logo featuring new colors (primarily white with green and black accents). The suburban-type buses in Transbay service were painted in primarily green.

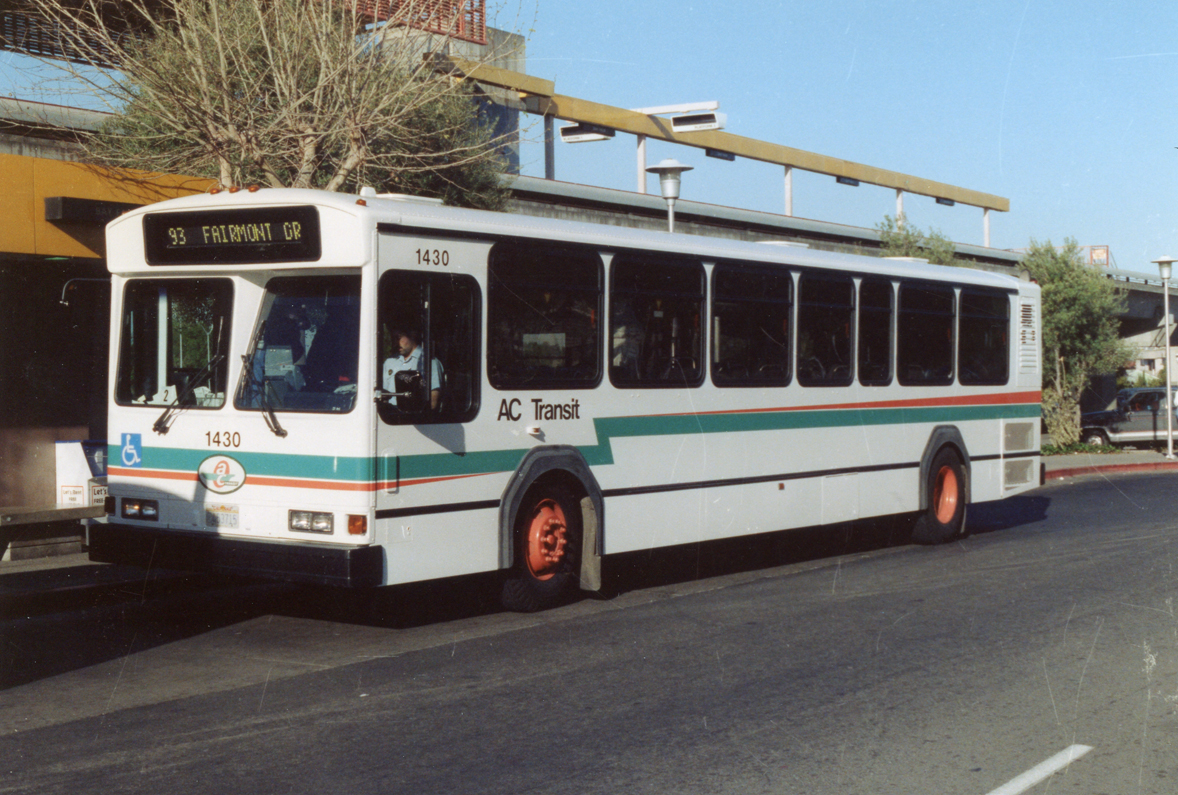
Gillig Phantom with "lightning" stripe livery variant

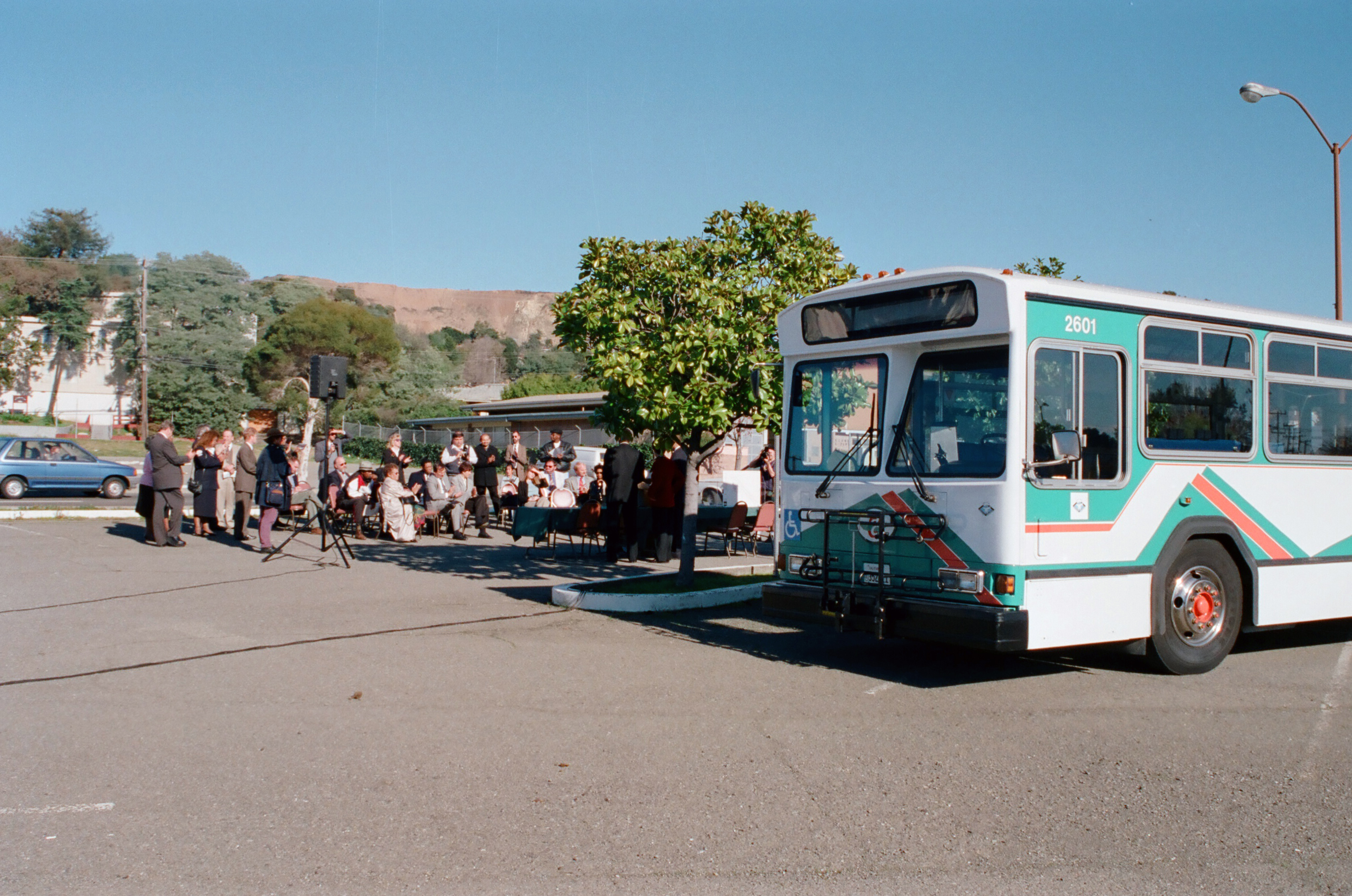
Gillig Phantom with "hills" stripe livery variant

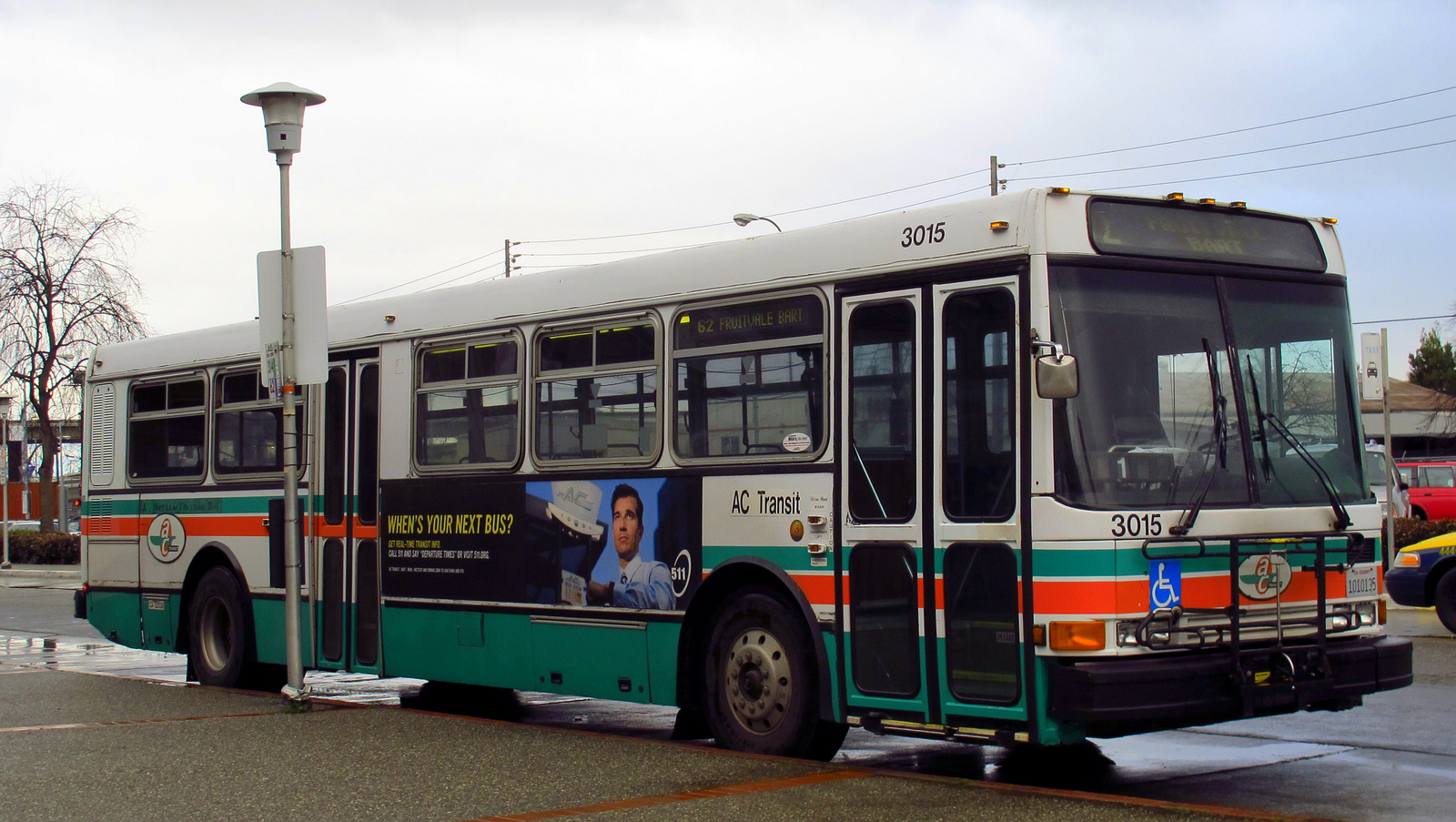
NABI 416 with 1980s "stripe" livery and wing logo

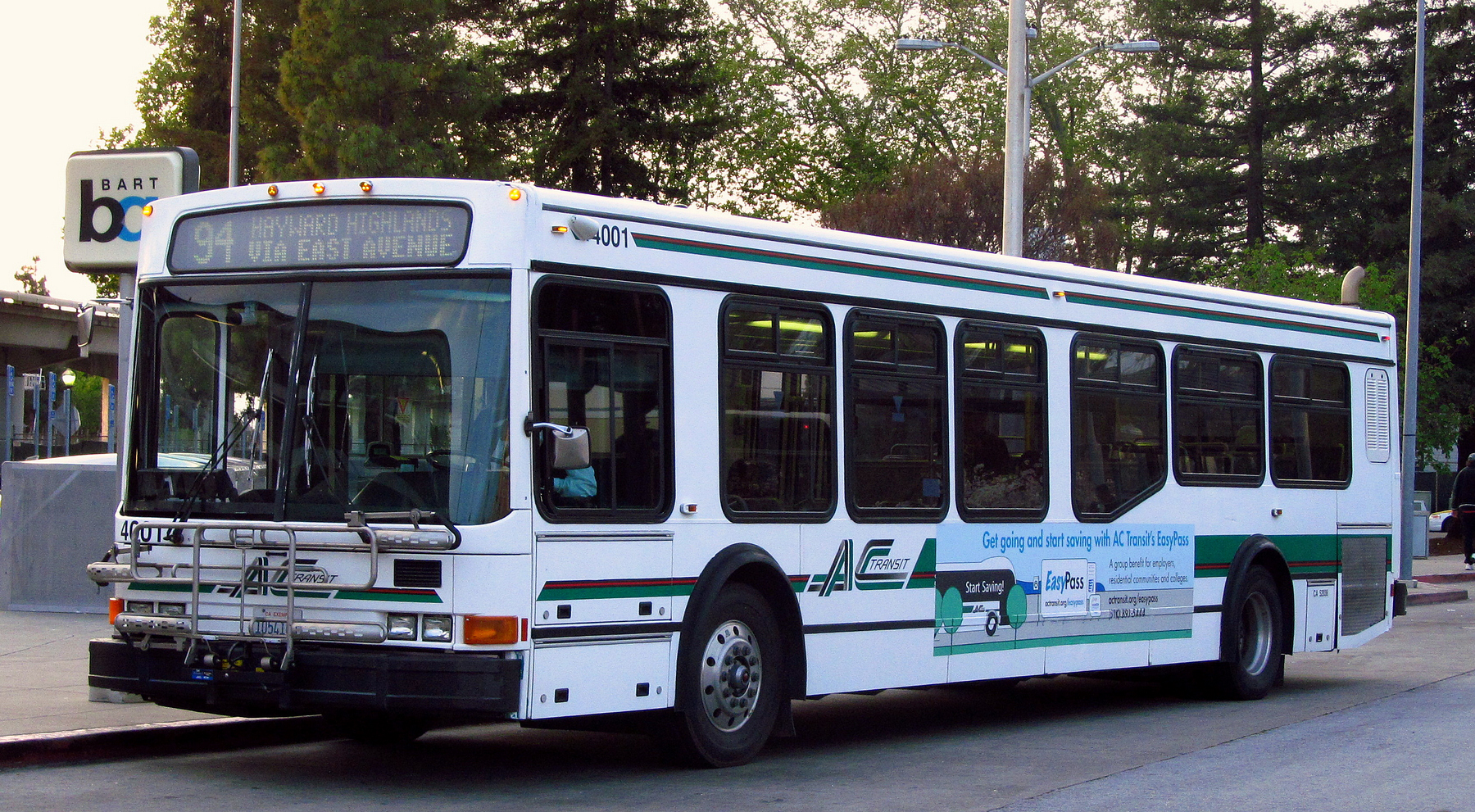
NABI 40-LFW with updated "ribbon" livery, colors, and logo

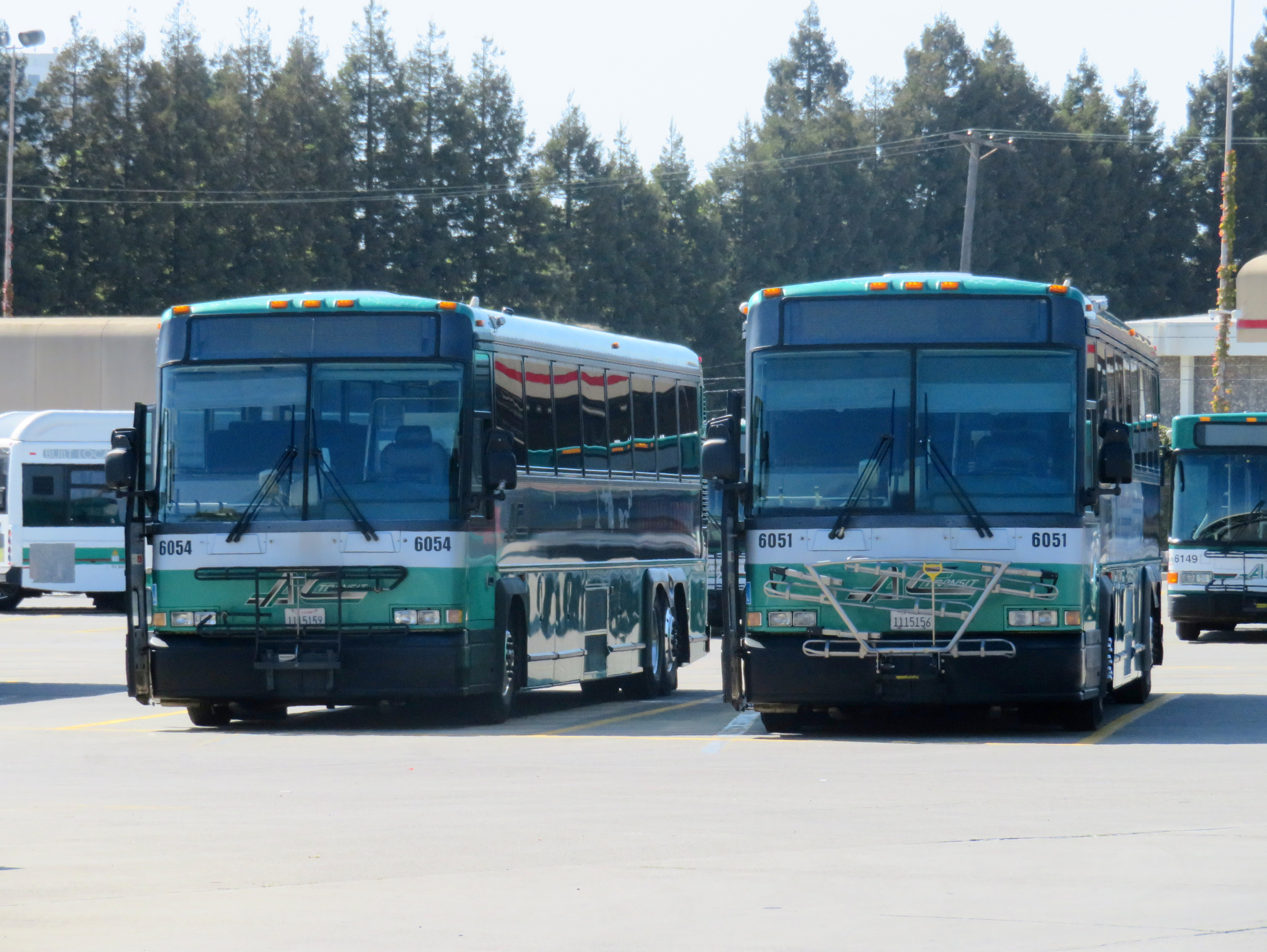
MCI suburban coaches are primarily finished in green.

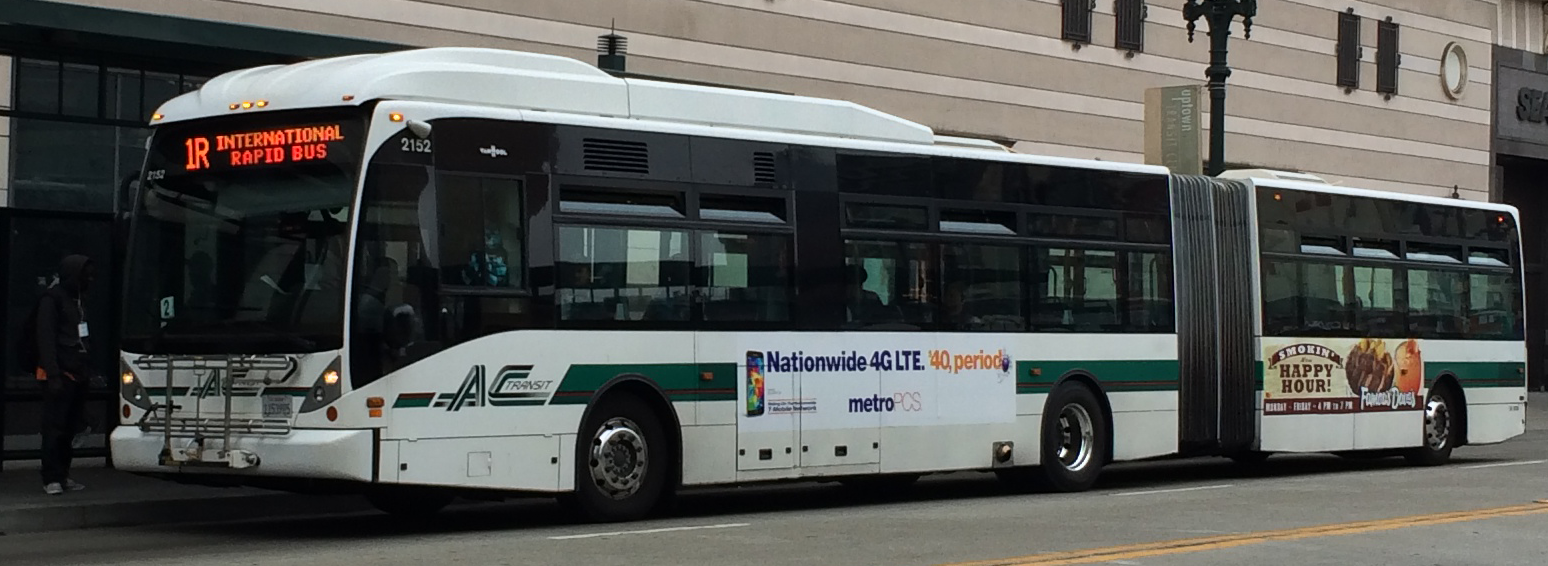
AC Transit #2152, Van Hool AG300 articulated in white with ribbon livery (2012)

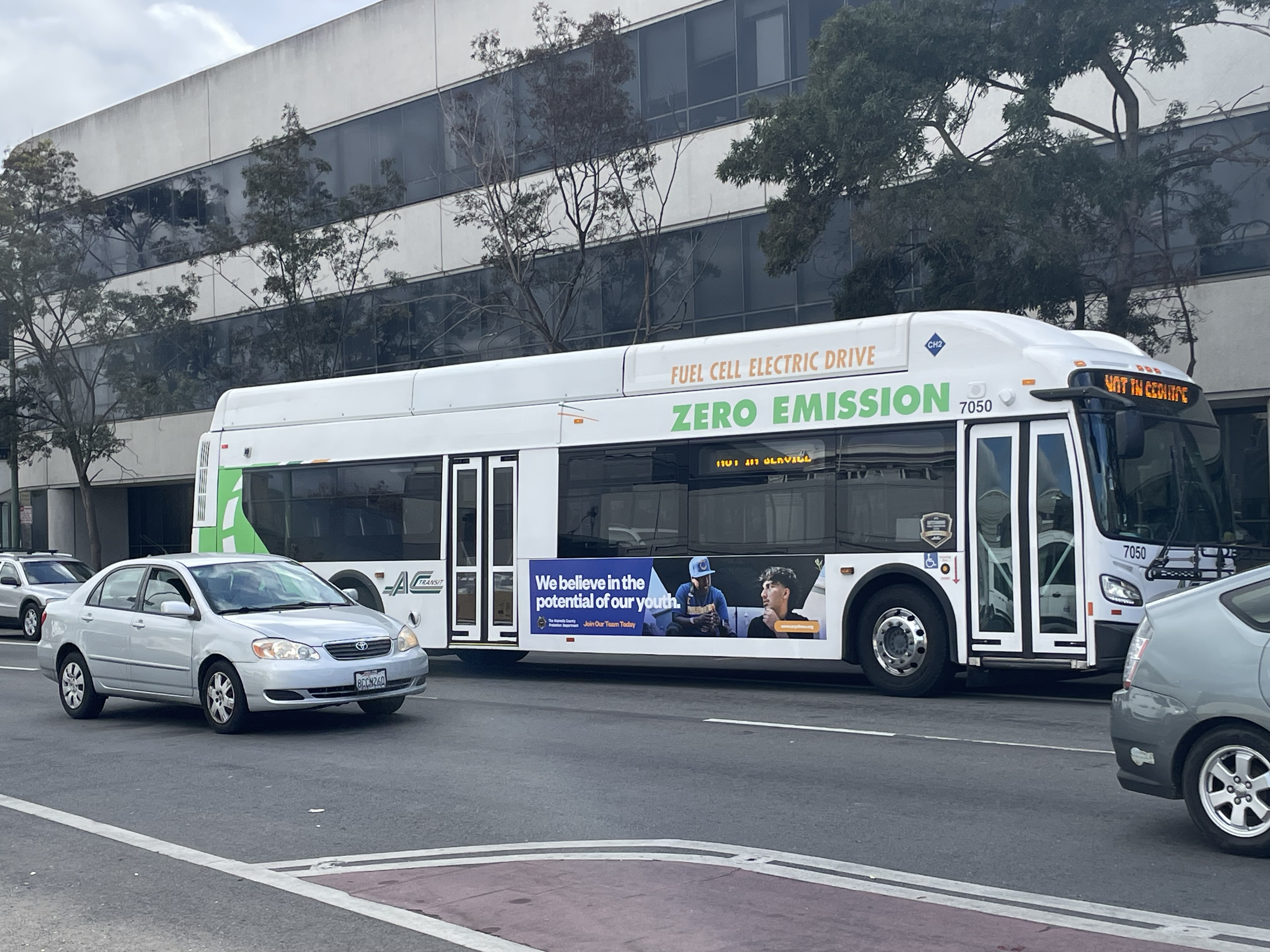
AC Transit #7050, New Flyer Xcelsior in white without ribbon

=== Logos ===
"Arrowhead" masthead logo of the Alameda-Contra Costa Transit District (May 1958)

"Ring-and-arrow" logo (1958–1960)

"Wing" logo (1960–2003)

Simplified "wing", as painted on signs and buses (1960-2003)

AC Transit adopted its first official "ring-and-arrow" emblem around September 1958, replacing an arrowhead logo that had been used on the masthead of its public newsletter Transit Times, first published in May 1958. The ring-and-arrow logo was replaced in 1960 when AC Transit adopted the familiar "wing" logo, which was "designed to imply a sense of motion and speed" although the colors were not finalized until September of that year. A simplified version of the wing logo was painted on buses and signs.

The wing logo was unchanged until 2003, when the District adopted a stylized green and gradient-gray "ribbon" logo, which was later simplified in 2014 by dropping the gradient and updating the typeface.

"Ribbon" logo (2003–2014)

Simplified "ribbon" logo (2014–present)

== Facilities ==
AC Transit facilities
- Headquarters
- Central Maintenance
- Operating Divisions
1 GO (Downtown Oakland)
2 D2 (Emeryville)
3 D3 (Richmond)
4 D4 (Seminary/East Oakland)
5 CMF (Central Maintenance Facility)
6 D6 (Hayward)

AC Transit sites
Name	1	2	3	4	5	6
Name	Downtown Oakland (Note: Administration) (Note: Operations Control Center)	Emeryville (Note: Operating Division)	Richmond	East Oakland (Note: D4 Annex counted separately)	Central Maintenance Facility (Note: Central maintenance and stores)	Hayward (Note: Colocated Training & Education Center)
Image						
Address	1600 Franklin St; Oakland	1177 47th St; Emeryville	2016 MacDonald Ave; Richmond	1100 Seminary Ave; Oakland (Note: D4 Annex: 905 66th Ave, Oakland)	10626 E.14th St; Oakland	1758 Sabre St; Hayward
Size	100,000 ft^{2} (9,300 m^{2})	392,000 ft^{2} (36,400 m^{2})	266,000 ft^{2} (24,700 m^{2})	579,500 ft^{2} (53,840 m^{2}) (Note: Does not include D4 Annex, which is 453,000 ft^{2} (42,100 m^{2}).)	517,000 ft^{2} (48,000 m^{2})	833,500 ft^{2} (77,430 m^{2}) (Note: Does not include Training and Educational Center at 20234 Mack St, which is 29,000 ft^{2} (2,700 m^{2}).)
Capacity (buses)	—	147	90	160	650	170
Supported functions

AC Transit operates out of six major sites in Alameda and Contra Costa counties: four operating divisions to handle light maintenance, refueling, and bus storage; a central maintenance facility for major overhauls, procurement, and parts storage; and an administrative headquarters.

=== General Office ===
AC Transit administration started in the Alameda County Courthouse, and later moved to temporary quarters in the Claremont Hotel in September 1957 before moving back to downtown Oakland at the Plaza Building at 506 15th Street in January 1959. With the purchase of Key System assets, AC Transit moved its General Offices (GO) into the Key System Building at 1106 Broadway in October 1960. The GO moved again to the Latham Square Building at 508 16th Street in April 1963, where it would stay for nearly 25 years. In late 1983, the District released a request for bids to build a new GO at 1600 Franklin, a site then occupied by a parking lot which had been purchased by AC Transit. Groundbreaking on the new site began in April 1985, and the first occupants moved into the 10-story building in June 1987. The building was built by private developers on public land, and a lease-to-own scheme meant the public would eventually own it as well.

=== Central Maintenance Facility ===
The Central Maintenance Facility (CMF) is close to Seminary Division; the site was originally built as a warehouse for the adjacent Durant Motors Star factory and was later used as a General Motors parts facility until it was purchased by AC Transit in 1980. Prior to the opening of CMF, major maintenance was performed at Emeryville Division.

=== Operating divisions ===
The operating divisions are located in Emeryville (Division 2), Richmond (D3), East Oakland (also known as Seminary, D4), and Hayward (D6); an annex adjacent to Seminary is known as 66th Avenue or D4 Annex. The Emeryville (D2), Richmond (D3), and East Oakland (D4) sites were acquired with the purchase of Key System assets in 1960.

D6 originally opened in Newark to serve southern Alameda County routes in November 1975. In 1981, AC Transit exercised an option to purchase a 17-acre (6.9 ha) site in Hayward from Mack Trucks to relieve overcrowding at the four operating divisions. D6 moved from Newark to Hayward in October 1986; the training center at Hayward had opened in 1985.

Richmond (D3) was closed in 2011 due to a serious fiscal crisis, and operations were moved to Emeryville. In 2014, the economy had recovered and reopening Richmond was studied. Although closing D3 had the intended effect of reducing labor costs, the three remaining divisions were operating at or near capacity and service was suffering, as buses for northern routes had to be brought in from Emeryville. Reopening Richmond would also increase operational flexibility, and AC Transit invested more than $15 million in improvements before reopening D3 in 2017.

In a 2018 study, AC Transit planners noted the four operating divisions were above their maximum bus capacity and presented a plan to remodel and expand three of the four operating divisions. Under the plan, Seminary (D4) would expand into a two-deck facility, taking advantage of an adjacent property owned by AC Transit on 66th Avenue and a potential purchase of a city-owned site to expand the total site area from 13.7 to 32 acres (5.5 to 12.9 ha) capable of holding 400 to 500 buses. A second division, known as Division 5, would be co-located at the expanded site. In addition, the plan called for the relocation of the Central Maintenance Facility from D4 to D6 (Hayward), the Training and Education Center (TEC) would be relocated from D6 to D2 (Emeryville), and D2 itself would be moved to a new 28-acre (11 ha) site close to the MacArthur Maze at the corner of Burma St and Maritime Ave.

== See also ==
Neighboring agencies:

- San Francisco Municipal Railway fleet
- SamTrans fleet
- Santa Clara Valley Transportation Authority
