= Ballard Power Systems =

Hydrogen fuel cells for heavy-duty transportation

Ballard Power Systems Inc.
- Formerly: Ballard Research
- Type: Public
- Traded as: TSX: BLDP
- Industry: Alternative energy
- Founded: 1979
- Headquarters: Burnaby, British Columbia, Canada
- Key people: Jim Roche, chairman Marty Neese, president and CEO
- Products: Fuel cells stacks; Fuel cells modules
- Revenue: ▲US$99.4 million (2025)
- Net income: ▲ −US$90.9 million (2025)
- Number of employees: 800 (Oct 2024)
- Website: ballard.com

Ballard Power Systems Inc. is a developer and manufacturer of proton exchange membrane (PEM) fuel cell products for markets such as heavy-duty motive (consisting of bus and tram applications), portable power, material handling as well as engineering services. Ballard has designed and shipped over 400 MW of fuel cell products to date.

== History ==
Ballard was founded in 1979 by geophysicist Geoffrey Ballard, Keith Prater, and Paul Howard, under the name Ballard Research Inc. to conduct research and development on high-energy lithium batteries. Since committing to the development of PEM fuel cell technology in 1989, Ballard has delivered PEM fuel cell products worldwide to a number of leading product manufacturers.

Ballard went public in 1993 on the Toronto Stock Exchange (TSE), and in 1995 was listed on the NASDAQ. Ballard Power Systems opened a fuel cell manufacturing facility in 2000 in Burnaby, B.C.

== Automotive fuel cell cooperations ==
On February 1, 2008, Ballard spun out Automotive Fuel Cell Cooperation (AFCC) to allow for further expansion of fuel cell technology. After the split, Ballard continued as a publicly traded company focusing on non-automotive applications (including buses), while AFCC became a privately held company of 150 employees, developing hydrogen fuel cell stacks for automobiles. AFCC's initial ownership split was Daimler AG (50.1%), Ford Motor Company (30.0%), and Ballard itself (19.9%).

In 2018, Ballard signed a contract with Weichai Power for a strategic partnership. Weichai acquired for US $163 million (19.9%) of Ballard's shares. As part of this collaboration, Ballard and Weichai intend to supply the Chinese market with fuel cell systems for trucks, busses, and forklifts.

In cooperation with German car manufacturer Audi, Ballard is part of a development partnership for automotive fuel cells, which will run at least until 2022. Ballard delivers fuel cells to bus manufacturers, e.g. Van Hool (Belgium), New Flyer (Canada) and Solaris (Poland).

== Other activity areas ==
Besides road vehicles, Ballard delivers fuel cells also for trains, mining trucks, marine applications, and backup power systems for critical infrastructures such as radio towers. Furthermore, a fuel cell system for application in drones is under development.

== Achievements ==
Ballard has:

- supplied vehicles with fuel cells traveling more than 200 million kilometers in total to date 2024
- access to 2,000 patents/applications
