= Automotive Fuel Cell Cooperation =

- Company type: Joint venture
- Industry: Automotive
- Founded: 1 February 2008
- Defunct: June 2018; 6 years ago
- Fate: Defunct, most of its equipment sold to Ballard Power Systems
- Headquarters: Vancouver, Canada
- Area served: Worldwide
- Products: Fuel cells
- Owner: Ford Motor Company (49.9%); Mercedes-Benz Group (50.1%)

Automotive Fuel Cell Cooperation (AFCC) was a Vancouver, British Columbia, Canada, based automotive fuel cell technology company. The company was formed on February 1, 2008 as a spin-off from its predecessor, Ballard Power Systems to allow for further expansion of fuel cell technology. After the split, Ballard continued as a publicly traded company focusing on non-automotive applications (including buses), while AFCC became a privately held company of 150 employees, developing hydrogen fuel cell stacks for automobiles. AFCC's initial ownership split was Daimler (50.1%), Ford Motor Company (30.0%), and Ballard itself (19.9%).

Ford Motor Company purchased the portion of AFCC owned by Ballard Power Systems in 2009 for $44.5M in gross proceeds, leaving it with 49.9% ownership, and Daimler AG (at present the Mercedes-Benz Group) as the major stakeholder with 50.1%.

An AFCC stack was used in the Mercedes-Benz F-Cell vehicle in 2010.

In 2013, AFCC's owners signed a three-way agreement with Nissan Motor Company to develop next-generation fuel cell technology that they hope will lead to the world's first affordable, mass-market fuel cell electric vehicles as early as 2017. The collaboration was to be jointly led by all three automakers with engineering work taking place at various locations around the world. AFCC was responsible for the research and product development of automotive fuel cell stacks for the collaboration.

The company's first CEO was Dr. Andreas Truckenbrodt formerly the executive director for hybrid development for Daimler AG. He led AFCC for more than 6 years from company inception through February 2014.

AFCC ended operations in June 2018, with much of the equipment was sold to Ballard Power Systems in July 2018.
