= History of Los Angeles Metro =

This article discusses the history of Los Angeles Metro; the regional transportation planning agency for Los Angeles County, California.

== Predecessors ==
Metro is the product of the merger of two previous agencies: the Southern California Rapid Transit District (SCRTD or more often, RTD) and the Los Angeles County Transportation Commission (LACTC). RTD was during the 1960s and 1980s (until the LACTC was created) the "800 pound gorilla" in bus transportation in Southern California. This led to some hostilities and problems with other agencies, as described in the above article on RTD.

== Merger and early expansions ==
Metro logo (1993 to 2004)

The State of California created the Los Angeles County Metropolitan Transportation Authority effective February 1, 1993 per AB152 (Katz). The former SCRTD and LACTC entities went out of business officially on April 1, 1993 after a 60 day cross-over and close out period, due to the inability of LACTC and SCRTD to cease long-standing feuds. The final straw and most embarrassing example of inter-agency contentious relations was based on a report in the Los Angeles Times on the Blue Line to Downtown Los Angeles (an LACTC project). The newspaper wrote that the line would terminate a mere six blocks (at the Pico Station) from the under construction 7th Street Metro Center subway station (an SCRTD project) preventing a logical ease of connection between the two rail lines. The public was outraged and politicians felt the heat as they too were outraged that the well-known poor relations between the two agencies would result in such a gap in what was supposed to be a regional system. Soon after, then assemblyman Richard Katz authored and was successful in passing legislation to combine the LACTC and SCRTD into the current Metro. The legislation went further to making the new agency more accountable to the public by centralizing policy authority in Metro board's permanent seats, held by the top Los Angeles City and County elected office holders (among them the Mayor of Los Angeles and the entire five-member Los Angeles County Board of Supervisors).

Initially, Metro retained the locations of the predecessor agencies in Downtown Los Angeles, but later moved to the 25-story Metro Headquarters Building adjacent to historic Los Angeles Union Station in 1995 with former SCRTD Operations staff occupying the lower half of the tower and former LACTC staff in Planning and Construction occupying the upper half demonstrating that old hostilities were still present after the merger. In addition, local media reports of expensive Italian marble, granite and limestone used in its construction resulted in the structure being derisively dubbed the Taj Mahal. Metro officials also pointed out that the funds used for its share of construction costs (it is a Turnkey private real estate development of the BNSF) could only be used for capital improvement or construction and not for operating expenses, subsidy of fares or the purchase of buses or trains. Housed within the building is the Dorothy Peyton Gray Transportation Research Library and Archives, a comprehensive collection of transportation-related books, videos, and other materials, said to be one of the largest in the nation held by a transit operator. The library is open to the public by appointment.

In 1994, the United Transportation Union (UTU), representing bus drivers, went on strike. At stake here were the issues of wages, insurance, and other necessities. This was settled, with operators and maintenance workers receiving a 4% wage increase initially and a 3.5% one for the second year. They also received considerable improvements in health insurance.

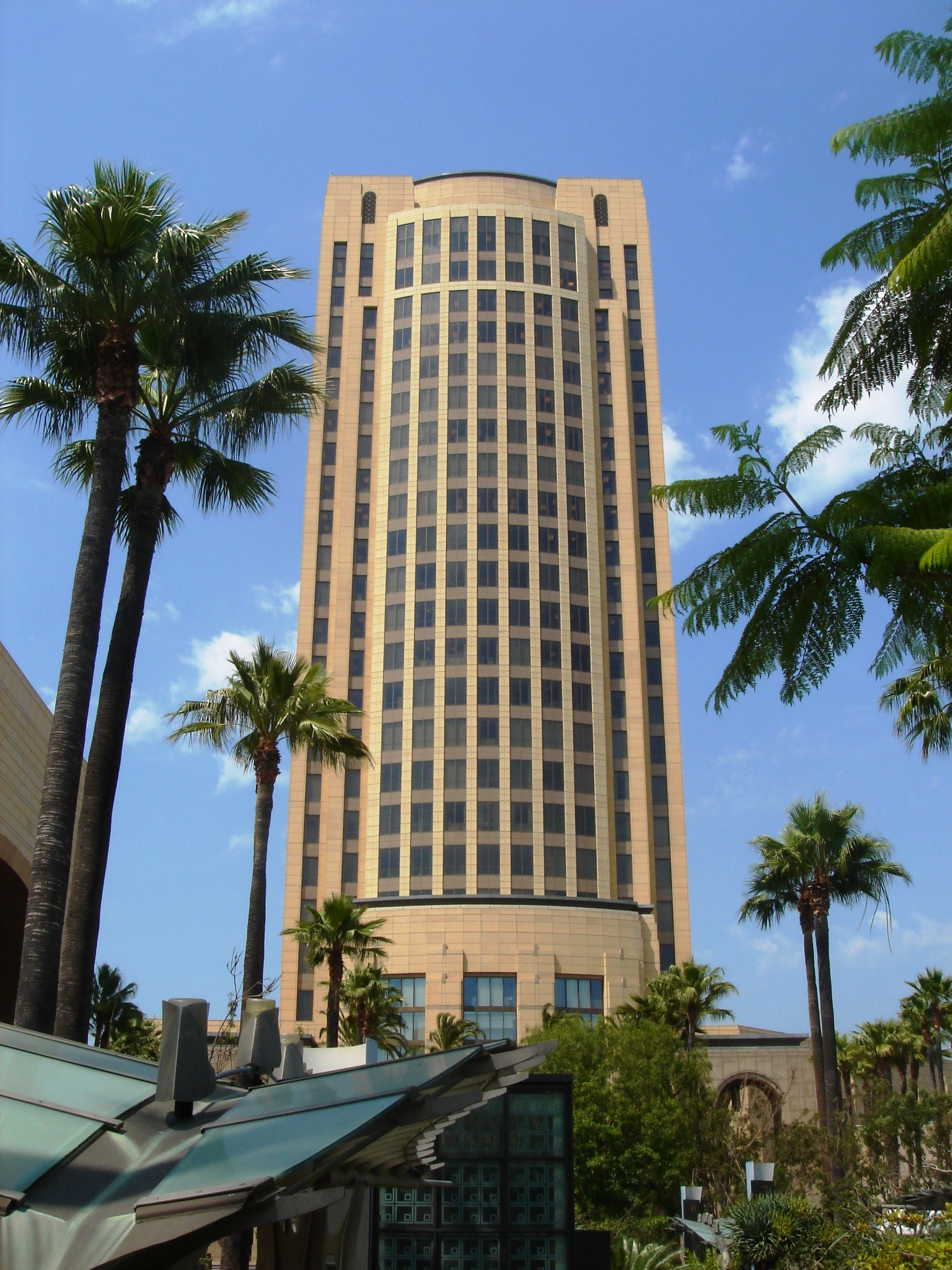
The Metro Headquarters Building at One Gateway Plaza, Metro's headquarters since 1995

Employees of the former Los Angeles County Transportation Commission were transferred in December 1996 to the Public Transportation Services Corporation, an independent corporation. PTSC allows former LACTC employees to participate in CalPERS and opt out of Social Security, and permits Metro planning employees to do planning for other agencies, which Metro currently does for Metrolink. Some union members have argued that PTSC is a "sham corporation" designed eventually to outsource Metro jobs.

=== Bus Riders Union agreement ===
When Metro announced plans for a bus fare increase and the elimination of monthly passes, the Bus Riders Union (BRU) with several co-plaintiff organizations filed a federal lawsuit with lawyers supplied by the NAACP Legal Defense Fund. They charged that the spending of money on commuter rail to affluent caucasian communities instead of on buses serving lower income communities of color was racist and demanded that more resources go to buses instead of rail projects. The BRU claimed that 50% of rail riders were white compared with 20% of bus riders. It argued that spending on rail projects reduced funding for bus service that disproportionately affected poor and minority riders who were dependent on public transit, and that improvements for the bus system would be more cost effective and require less subsidy than building a rail system.

In 1996, under the direction of then-L.A. mayor Richard Riordan, Metro signed a ten-year consent decree with the BRU to avoid litigation. Riordan would later state that the signing of this consent decree was a mistake. At the time, the Metro board was led to believe from information provided by Metro staff that load factors could be maintained with existing levels of bus service and without impacting the rail construction timetable; this proved false.

The agreement required an average of fewer than eight standees on a normal 40-seat bus in a 20-minute period during peak hours and a 60-minute period during the off-peak. It also required the Authority to operate special services designed to better connect the poor with important job centers and medical facilities. Provisions of the decree that restricted Metro's ability to raise fares beyond inflation expired January 1, 2004. Donald Bliss, the Special Master overseeing the consent decree, resigned this position in February 2006. No one has been appointed to take his place. The decree expired on October 29, 2006. The BRU made an attempt to extend the decree, but federal judge Terry J. Hatter, Jr. denied this motion on October 25.

=== Revenue loss ===
In 1998, frustrated with sinkholes, cost overruns, and perceived mismanagement, 65% of Los Angeles County voters approved a ballot measure sponsored by County Supervisor Zev Yaroslavsky that barred the use of county sales tax money for all future subway projects.

With the passage of the initiative and a lack of confidence from federal and state agencies, Metro brought in Julian Burke, a turn-around expert from the private sector. His goal was to revive Metro's reputation and stabilize its precarious budgetary condition. He recommended suspension of construction on both the Pasadena Blue Line light rail line to Pasadena and an extension of the Red Line to East L.A. Metro also halted planning for future subway extensions. Construction on the Hollywood and North Hollywood extensions of the Red Line continued as these projects were more than 80% complete.

In 2000 the UTU again went on strike, shutting down virtually all rail and bus operations. The issue this time involved transit zones and the fear that many of Metro's routes would be outsourced. A transit zone is a government agency that operates bus service in a given region with contractors not directly employed by their agency, such as Foothill Transit. The argument some politicians made were that transit zones were more cost effective than Metro service, because drivers could be paid reduced wages. In addition, service would be more aligned with community needs since these zones would be smaller than the existing Metro. Transit zones were proposed for the San Fernando Valley and western San Gabriel Valley. Ultimately, the formation of any new transit zones was killed off by a state poison pill law, SB1101 (Murray) that requires any new zone to honor existing union contracts, plus 4 additional years at the same terms or better, thus negating any cost savings in labor and making it nearly impossible to meet the cost savings formula required of new transit zones under California PUC 130051 et al.

Concerned about the suspension of the 11% completed Blue Line to Pasadena, Pasadena rail advocates lobbied State Senator Adam Schiff to continue construction. He authored Senate Bill 1847, Chapter 1021. Signed into law in 1998, the bill created the Pasadena Blue Line Construction Authority, an independent authority to complete the suspended light rail line to Pasadena. The law went into force on January 1, 1999. Once completed, the authority turned the line over to Metro for operation. The concept was so successful that a similar authority has been established for the Expo Line and the Gold Line extensions.

When it became clear the Pasadena Blue Line would not connect with the Blue Line, as originally planned, the board voted to change the name of the line. Some board members proposed the "Rose Line" in honor of Pasadena's famed annual Tournament of Roses Parade and Rose Bowl game. However, because planned East L.A. extensions of this line would cross communities far from Pasadena, the board renamed it the Gold Line, because California is known as the Golden State, and because of the gold miners in the Pasadena foothills.

In the spring of 2000, ground was rebroken on the stalled Pasadena Blue Line, later renamed the Gold Line.

On June 12, 1999, the extension to Hollywood/Vine was completed. On June 24, 2000, the Red Line reached North Hollywood. Because of the ban on the use of county sales tax for subway construction, and a local ban on the construction of new rail lines in the San Fernando Valley area (which prevented the Orange Line from being built as rail), further extensions of the Red Line are not likely to happen soon. Also in 2000, there was a separate federal ban sponsored by Congressman Henry Waxman, barring the use of federal dollars in the Wilshire Boulevard corridor, which prevented any extensions of the original Red Line route (now branded the Purple Line); this ban was repealed by 2007.

Metro also unveiled the first of 26 planned Metro Rapid bus routes in June, which were Metro Rapid Lines 720 (Wilshire Blvd./Whittier Blvd.) and 750 (Ventura Blvd.).

In response to the arguments made over transit zones, the Metro Board created service sectors on September 26, 2002. There are six service sectors: Gateway Cities (Divisions 1 and 2), San Fernando Valley (Divisions 8 and 15), San Gabriel Valley (Divisions 3 and 9), South Bay (Divisions 5 and 18), and Westside/Central (Divisions 7 and 10, plus Terminal 6) for bus service, and Metro Rail Operations for rail service. Each service sector has a general manager overseeing the operation of two or three bus yards or the rail system. The bus service sectors each have a Governance Council that oversees the bus routes operating out of each yard and has the responsibility to plan service in each sector within a certain budget, while Metro Rail Operations reports directly to the Metro Board. The service sectors are designed to be more responsive to community input, but since many bus riders ride routes from multiple sectors – largely because the sectors operate lines that cross into adjacent sectors – bus riders often do not know which governance council to complain to, a problem that was identified by the California State Auditor.

In February 2003, Metro became the first agency in the nation to use a bus made of composite carbon and polyester fibers. These "Compo Buses" are 2,100 pounds lighter than a regular bus, increase fuel economy, boast a faster acceleration and deceleration rate, and feature reduced maintenance cost. Current Compobuses are the 40-foot 7980-7999 series (NABI 40C-LFW) and the 45-foot 8000-8099 series (NABI 45C-LFW). In 2008-2010 NABI delivered new NABI 45Cs (8100-8400). Metro ordered more NABI 45C buses (8401-8491) and large number of additional NABI 45C buses (8500-8649) in 2012-13.

On July 26, 2003, the Gold Line to Pasadena was completed and turned over to the Metropolitan Transportation Authority for operation. The construction authority completed it on time and under budget, although Metro had to spend an additional $130 million to purchase cars and test the line. On opening weekend, due to massive public interest, some waited up to three hours to board the trains. Free rides were offered for the first two days of service.

=== Day pass ===
A few months after the Gold Line opened, and for the third time in nine years, Metro experienced a strike. The Amalgamated Transit Union struck over issues concerning a health insurance trust fund the transit agency pays into and the union manages. The ATU wanted Metro to contribute more to cover the steeply rising costs of medical care. However, an independent audit showed the union had mismanaged the nearly bankrupt trust fund, making the agency unwilling to contribute more money without getting a managerial stake.

On December 17, 2003, Metro introduced the US$3 "day pass" and lowered fares from US$1.35 to US$1.25. The day pass allows patrons to get on and off Metro buses and trains as many times as they like within one operational day without paying an additional fare. Also, Metro limited transfers to non-Metro bus systems. As of July 1, 2007 the cost of the day pass was increased to US$5. As of July 2010 the cost of the day pass was increased again, costing US$6, however, the cost was brought down by US$5 in August 2011, and then to US$7 in September 2014.

As of March 15, 2009, the day pass is sold only in electronic format on TAP cards for bus riders. Riders are required to have a TAP card in order to load a day pass. A day pass can also be loaded onto a TAP Card at a ticket vending machine, a pass vendor, or a Metro Customer Center.

=== Naming changes ===
After 1991, the agency used the word "Metro" almost exclusively to describe many of its services. In 2003, after primarily using "Metropolitan Transportation Authority" or the acronym "MTA", the agency switched back to simply using "Metro". The full name of the agency remains the "Los Angeles County Metropolitan Transportation Authority", the name given to it by the state legislation which brought it into existence.

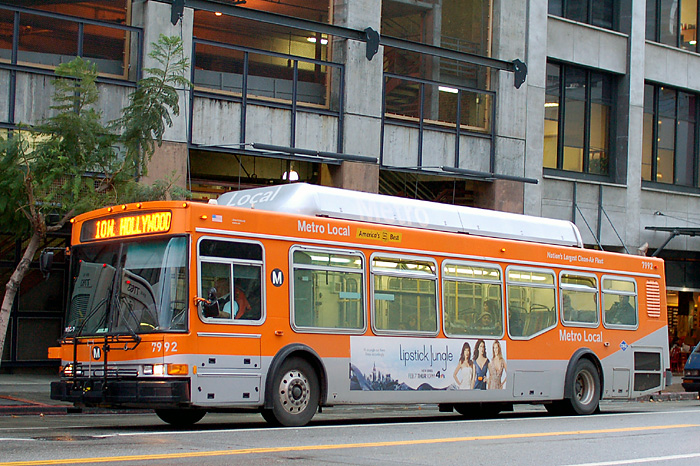
Metro Local (NABI 40C-LFW)

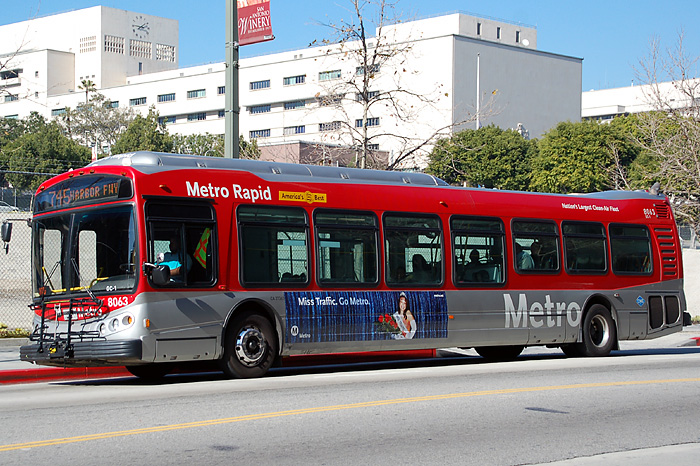
Metro Rapid (NABI 45C-LFW)

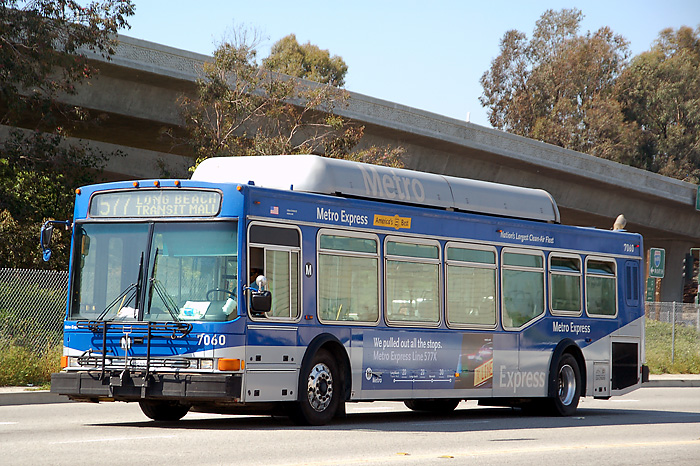
Metro Express (NABI 40-LFW)

Metro Liner (NABI 60-BRT)

Along with a new name and logo, the agency updated the livery of its buses to clearly identify each vehicle with the type of service it provides:

- The base color throughout the bus and rail fleet became silver. The silver livery of each bus was bisected with a very wide, colored stripe indicating the type of service provided by that bus, with the silver color remaining on the rooftop and lower half of the bus.
- Rapid buses received a wide, red stripe.
- Local (frequent-stop) buses, as well as limited-stop buses, received a wide, California poppy orange stripe.
- Express (freeway-service) buses received a wide, dark blue stripe. (As of 2015, the Express branding is no longer applied, as the Express lines 450 and 577 have been modified to serve areas in local service.)
- Buses providing bus rapid transit service on the Orange and Silver lines have been branded with a wide, dark silver stripe with text indicating "Metro Liner" or "Metro Silver Line". The Orange and Silver lines debuted in 2005 and 2009, respectively.
- All Metro Rail vehicles would maintain their stainless steel color or be painted silver and various trim colors were applied. As of August 2013, Metro began painting its railcars in shades of "cool gray" with white supergraphics and yellow visibility markings.

=== Metro Orange Line ===
On October 29, 2005, the 14 miles (23 km) Orange Line began operation. The US$354 million transitway traverses the San Fernando Valley. It is the region's first bus to operate within its dedicated right-of-way. Within its first week of operation, the at-grade Orange Line experienced three collisions with automobiles, all deemed the fault of drivers who ran red lights. Since the first few weeks of operation, accidents on the line have declined significantly.

Metro has embarked on various measures to increase the visibility of Orange Line Metroliners, including installing white LED strobes on each side of the vehicle to make them appear as if an emergency vehicle was crossing the red-lighted intersections. Drivers' tactics include slowing to approximately 10 miles per hour (16 km/h) at intersections with poor cross-traffic visibility or blind spots. In addition, the police department heavily patrols the route, with officers in marked cruisers and motorcycles distributing red-light citations.

The route continues to enjoy rapidly increasing ridership with each passing week, owing to the relatively consistent speed, minimum of stops along the route as well as remarkable scenery along some stretches, most notably the Sepulveda Basin portion of the route, which invokes an enjoyable ride in the country feeling as it passes park land and a sod farm. The project spent many millions of dollars solely in the landscape portion of the budget to produce a truly scenic ride. Many runs are standing room only. Metro continues to add more scheduled runs as well as double dispatching on some departures with more than one Metroliner assigned to each scheduled run.

By May 2006, Metro announced that the Orange Line had 21,828 average daily boardings, nearly reaching the ridership goals that were predicted for 2020. Outside groups have said that the Orange Line has already reached capacity and that it is time to start planning for a light rail line replacement.

Other groups have lobbied for the completion of the originally conceived Wilshire Boulevard subway. The two proposals are not mutually exclusive. Although Waxman's legislation halted construction over safety concerns, Waxman relented in October 2005 after an investigation by experts selected jointly by the congressman and the American Public Transportation Association. The expert panel concluded:

By following proper procedures and using appropriate technologies the risk of tunneling would be no greater than other subway systems in the U.S.

In years prior, Waxman had stated that if such a panel deemed tunneling safe in the Mid-Wilshire district, he would authorize legislation that would lift the ban on federal monies being used for subway construction. This has since been done; however, no money has been allocated for future construction of the Wilshire Boulevard subway. Any subway project would require years of planning; either the project will need to compete for federal money with many other projects across the USA, or funds will have to be raised at the local or state levels. This is also problematic due to the aforementioned 1998 Yaroslavsky measure prohibiting use of local sales taxes for underground construction. This may be avoided by through a loophole: the measure forbids use of local money for "new" subway construction, and the Wilshire Boulevard subway was planned well before the 1998 measure.

To recognize the line's ultimate destination to the ocean, Metro proposed renaming the line the Aqua Line. However, other Metro board members voiced opposition, suggesting other names such as the "Cardinal Line" or other names.

In 2006, apparently in anticipation of extending the subway along Wilshire Boulevard past Western Avenue, Metro designated the Purple Line, which consists of six stations it shares with the Red Line from Union Station to Vermont, as well as the unshared segment from Vermont to Western Avenue in Koreatown.

=== Metro Silver Line ===
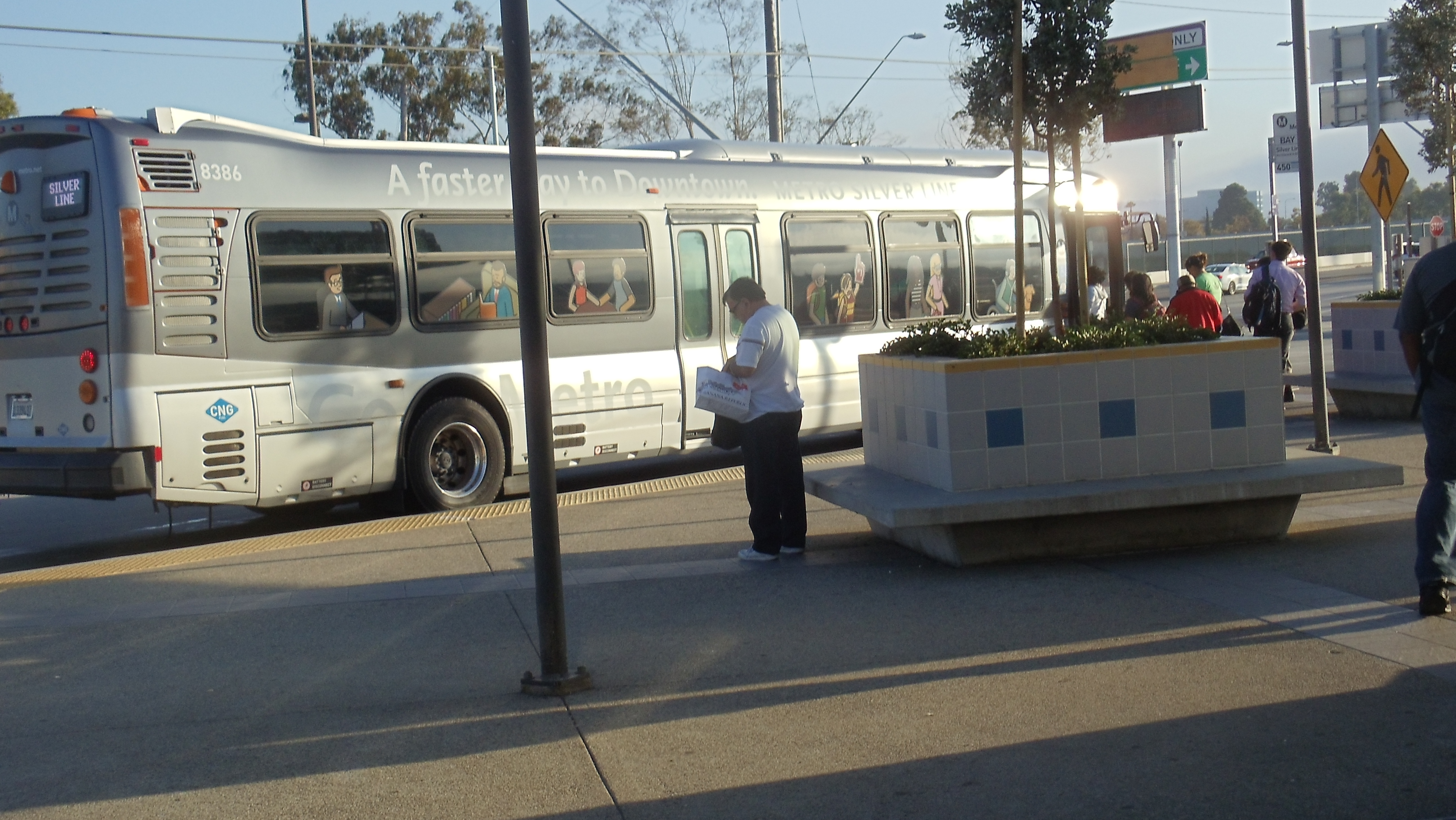
Passengers boarding the Metro J Line to Downtown Los Angeles & El Monte station

On December 13, 2009, Metro began operating on the J Line (the Silver Line). The line's length is 26 miles (42 km), almost twice as long as the Metro G Line. Currently, the J Line is the longest in the Go Metro Map. Unlike the Metro G Line, the Metro J Line was not constructed to begin revenue operations. It is the second line in the Los Angeles Metro Busway. The line gets its color from the El Monte Busway route color. The bronze color was also considered but then set aside for the potential identification of a future rail line. Using grants and funds from the Metro ExpressLanes project, the line began operation between the Harbor Gateway Transit Center, Downtown Los Angeles, and El Monte station. The line does not run on dedicated busways like the Metro Orange Line. Instead, the line runs on Hov Lanes on the El Monte Busway and Harbor Transitway, which are on the I-10 and I-110 freeways. Some passengers consider the line like a Metro Express line, but it has a few differences. It is the only bus line in the Metro Bus & Rail system with a different and higher fare. The Silver Line's base fare is $2.45. Since the line runs on the freeways, it has higher fares. The Metro Silver Line only has 9 busway stations and the rest are street stops. The 9 busway stations are not completely dedicated for the Metro Silver Line. Instead, the stations are shared by other lines which also run on the busways. Other Metro Express lines and other municipal operator lines share the stations with the Metro Silver Line. None of the Silver Line stations have art nor Metro pylon signs. There are also no ticket vending machines at the 9 stations. The 10 street stops feature no special shelters nor any ticket vending machines. There are no off board payment amenities nor any all door boarding. The bus payment is made on board. The Metro Silver Line concept first began in its planning stages in August 1993. The purpose was to simply service on the Harbor Transitway and the El Monte Busway. It was supposed to replace several Metro Express Lines. The report did include the idea of operating the Dual Hub BRT with articulated buses, ticket vending machines at all stations and street stops. The street stops were supposed to be replaced by special shelters dedicated only for the Metro Silver Line. Due to lack of funds and operational grants, the line was never implemented in 1993. The Metro Silver Line concept was revived for discussion in 2008, and in 2009, the line was implemented.

== Budget cuts, recentralization ==
Since 2008, as a result of the Great Recession, Metro service has been reduced by over 941,000 service hours, or approximately 20% of all service, which has caused complaints by the Bus Riders Union. The cuts triggered a federal civil rights investigation, where the Federal Transit Administration found that requirements with the Civil Rights Act of 1964 were not complied with, although no additional services were requested to be readded. Ultimately, a comprehensive review was conducted and the service cuts of 2007-2011, fare changes, and other modifications in service were found by FTA not to have broken federal law. In addition, the service sectors were eliminated due to budget cuts in 2009, although "regional service councils" composed of the previous elected officials were maintained.

In 2006, the Los Angeles County Metropolitan Transportation Authority was named Outstanding Transportation System for 2006 by the American Public Transportation Association. Most buses and trains have "America's Best" decals affixed.

In 2007, with the consent decree with the Bus Riders Union (BRU) expired, Metro announced plans for a fare hike. The agency said that it needed to reduce its $100 million deficit, which would be done either by raising fares or reducing service. This proposal garnered strong opposition from Mayor Antonio Villaraigosa, Councilman Bernard Parks, the BRU, and low-income residents.

Starting July 15, 2018, inter-agency paper transfers were discontinued on Metro buses. Instead, riders must now use a TAP card when transferring between Metro and municipal buses. (This payment method uses the Stored Value format, which first deducts the base fare, then the inter-agency's transfer amount is deducted when passengers transfer.)

== Current expansions ==
Measure R, a proposal that enacted a 1/2 cent increase in sales tax to fund transportation throughout Los Angeles County, including rail, subway, and freeway improvements, was approved by voters in November 2008.

In September 2005, Metro broke ground on a 6 miles (9.7 km) extension of the Gold Line from Union Station, which now runs through Little Tokyo to the corner of Pomona and Atlantic Boulevards in East L.A. The Eastside Gold Line Extension light rail extension replaces a once-planned Red Line subway extension. It travels mostly at grade but has two underground stations. The extension began operation on November 15, 2009, serving some of the city's most historically underserved neighborhoods. The first passengers boarded the train at 3:40 a.m. An estimated 50,000 people participated in "a festive day of celebration and free rides."

The Metro Silver Line, a reconfiguration of existing service on the Harbor and El Monte Transitways, opened on December 13, 2009.

=== Expo Line ===
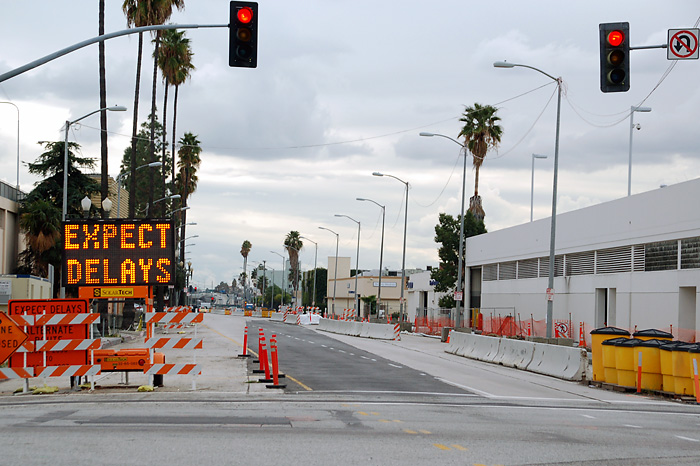
Construction for the Expo Line

In the years following Congressman Waxman's blocking of plans to tunnel a subway through the dense Wilshire corridor, traffic and congestion have risen considerably. The problem was underscored in 2000 when the art collective Heavy Trash group erected eight large signs along public streets announcing the construction of the "Aqua Line," a 15 miles (24 km) subway "connecting downtown to the Westside." The Aqua Line was a hoax, but Heavy Trash intended to raise awareness that heavily congested and populated West Los Angeles still lacked rail access.

Metro officially proposed the Mid-City/Exposition Light Rail Transit Project, a project to construct a light rail line that begins in Downtown Los Angeles and ends in Downtown Santa Monica. Local and state sales tax and other funds were set aside for this project, and the Final Environmental Impact Report was approved in December 2005. Surveying of the former freight railway line began on May 30, 2006, and the ground was broken in 2006 on the line's first phase, which runs from Downtown Los Angeles to Culver City. The line officially opened on April 28, 2012.

== See also ==
- Los Angeles County
- Transportation in Los Angeles
