= Los Angeles Metro bus fleet =

Transit bus fleet operated and contracted by LACMTA

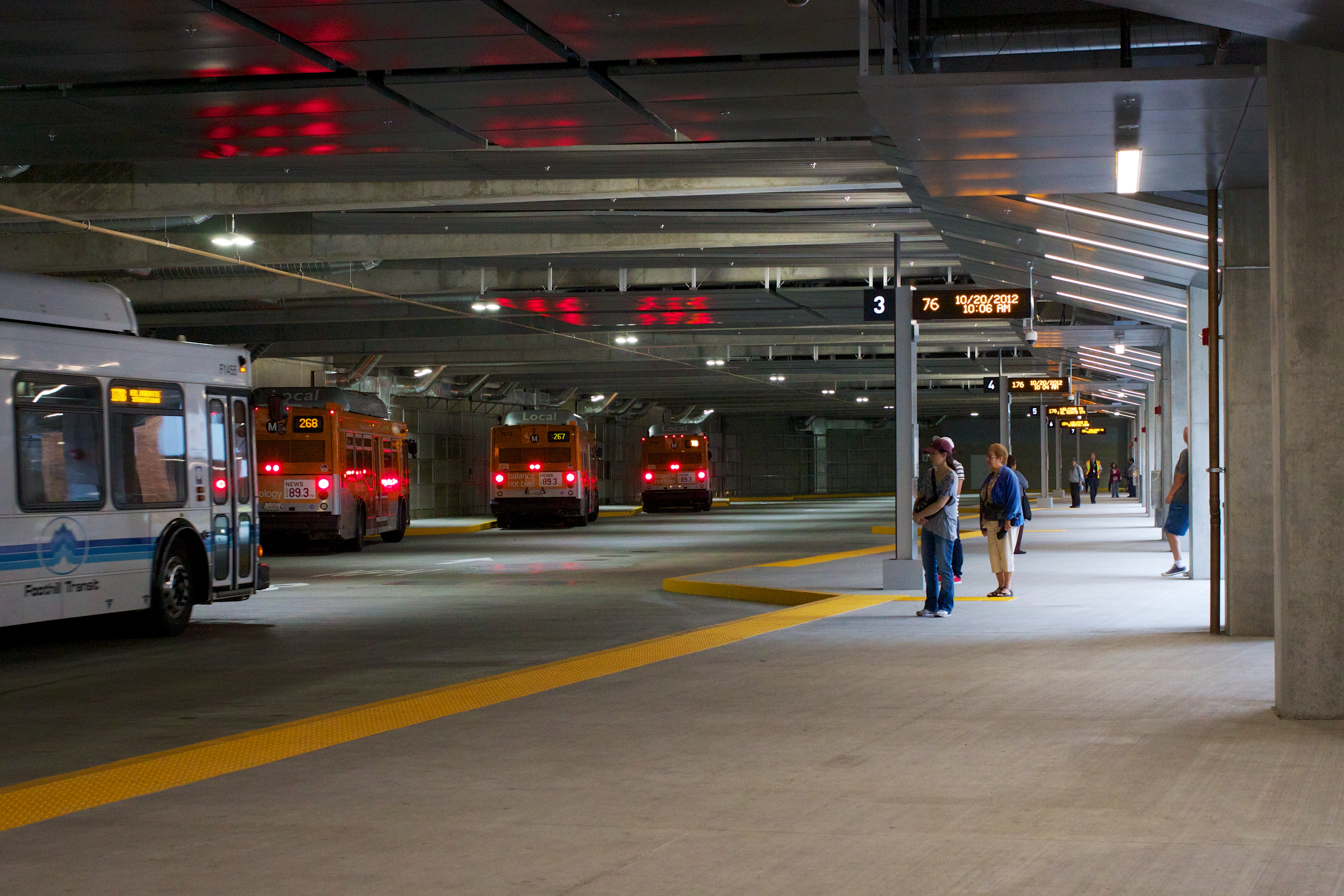
Metro buses and a Foothill Transit bus at El Monte station (2012)

Los Angeles Metro operates a vast fleet of buses for its Metro Bus and Metro Busway services. As of May 2026, Metro has the third largest bus fleet in North America with 2,086 buses.

== Overview ==
Metro and its predecessor agencies (LAMTA, 1951–64; RTD, 1964–93) have ordered buses from many manufacturers, including GM, Flxible, Grumman, AM General, Transportation Manufacturing Corporation (TMC), Neoplan USA, New Flyer Industries, ElDorado National, Orion Bus Industries, Thomas Built Buses, Blue Bird Corporation, and North American Bus Industries (NABI).

=== Emissions reduction ===
Metro has purchased buses using alternative fuels to diesel, generally consuming compressed natural gas (CNG), since the mid-1990s. The CNG fleet reduces emissions of particulates by 90%, carbon monoxide by 80%, and greenhouse gases by 20%. Alternative fuel buses have logged more than 450,000,000 mi (720,000,000 km) of operation since 1993, an industry record.

In 2015, a battery electric BYD K11M demonstrator was used on the G Line. Metro has committed to move the entire fleet to zero emissions by 2030, ahead of the California Air Resources Board's Innovative Clean Transit requirement for California transit operators to transition by 2040. Since then, the deadline has been pushed back to 2032. Metro board members subsequently rejected a move to delay fleet electrification until 2035. As a first step, the G (formerly Orange) Line will move to full zero-emissions operation by 2020, followed by the J (formerly Silver) Line as soon as possible after that. The G/Orange Line transitioned to all-electric operation by October 2021, using a fleet of 40 New Flyer Xcelsior XE60 Charge NG buses. Each bus has a range of approximately 150 mi (240 km), and rapid overhead charging stations were installed at the North Hollywood, Canoga, and Chatsworth stations.

As of the end of June 2024, due to heat stress and reliability issues with on route charging equipment, Metro has begun using 40-foot (12 m) CNG powered buses to supplement the G Line's dedicated battery-electric fleet. This undoes the G Line's electrification achievement, a long-standing Metro-touted victory in its troubled history of attempting to electrify its bus fleet. The de-electrification of the G Line is despite the board's recent direction to devise a new plan for electrification as soon as possible. Though many of Metro's previous failures have been attributed to its dealings with BYD, the problematic charging equipment on the G Line is manufactured by Siemens, and the buses on the G Line are manufactured by New Flyer.

=== Vehicle technology ===
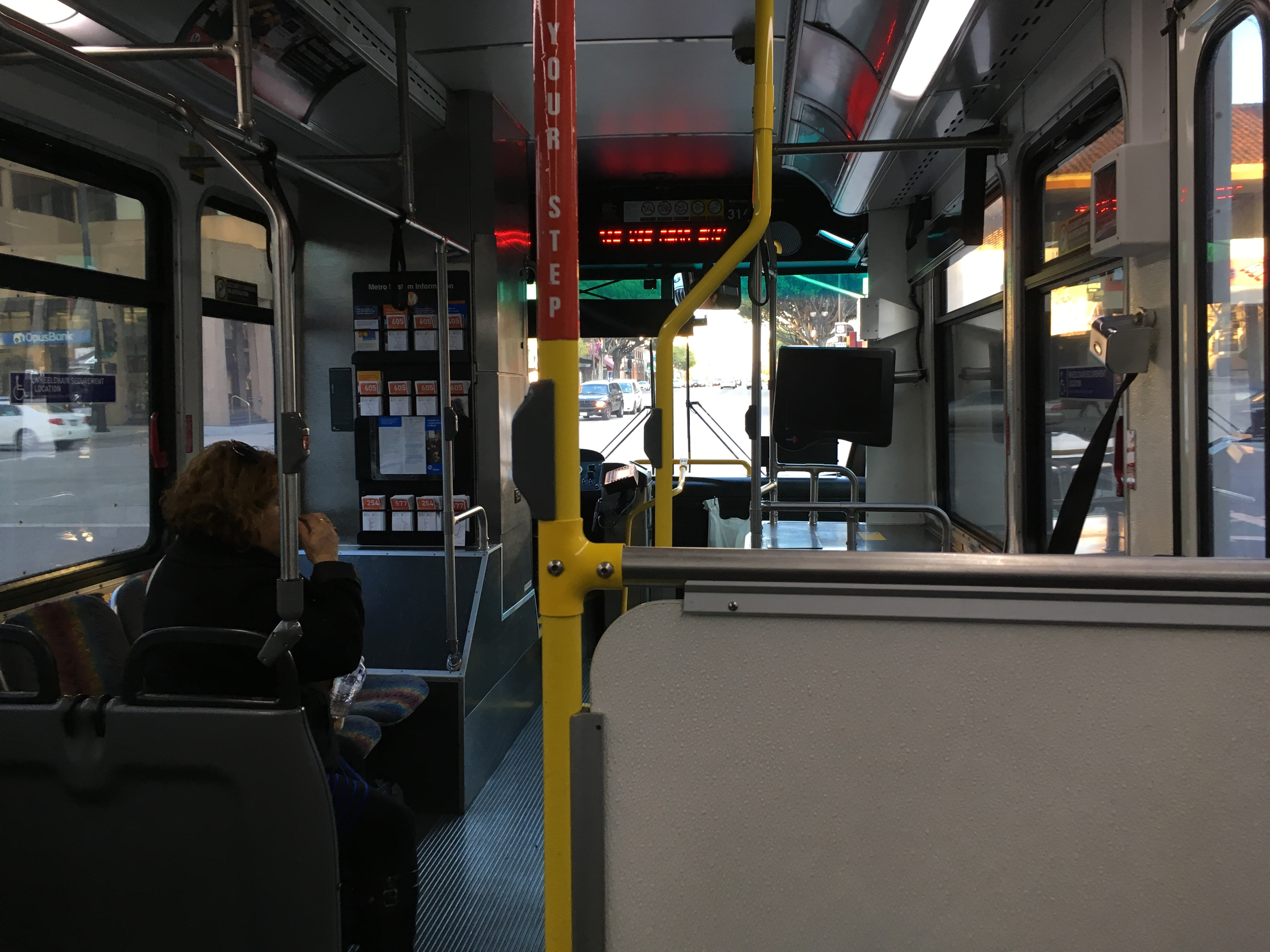
Interior of NABI 31-LFW (2016), looking forward. A screen is still installed over the front curb-side wheel, but is not being used.

Metro has also increased its use of on-board vehicle technology. Many buses were equipped with monitors to display real-time bus maps to show the location through GPS navigation starting in 2004; this the first of its kind in the United States. Later, the screens began showing Transit TV broadcasts, including local news programs, starting in August 2006.

The screens were shut off and Transit TV service was discontinued in early 2015, as more passengers were relying on their personal mobile devices, such as cell phones, smartphones, and electronic tablets, for entertainment while riding the buses. The increased use of personal mobile devices by passengers led to the implementation of WiFi on all buses by April 2017. Also, as part of Metro's Advanced Transportation Management System (ATMS) project, most buses include a marquee displaying the date and time, Automatic Voice Annunciation (AVA) for audio and visual announcements of each stop, and an audio and visual "Stop Requested" announcement was added to all buses in 2008. A supplemental audio announcement of "For your safety, watch your step when exiting the bus" was added to all buses on February 28, 2013, and changed voice in March 2015.

== Bus fleet ==
When it was formed in 1993, Metro inherited a large fleet of GM/TMC RTS diesel buses; these were initially replaced by Neoplan USA Transliner buses as they aged and retired. Starting in the early 2000s, the primary supplier to the Metro bus fleet was NABI, over a period of approximately 15 years. As one of its largest clients, Metro had considerable influence on NABI designs, including its bus rapid transit vehicles, the 60-BRT designed for the G Line and the composite-bodied Metro 45C, which was named after the agency and shared with Valley Metro.

After NABI's closure in 2015, several variants of the New Flyer Xcelsior and the ENC Axess were purchased to replace the NABI fleet.

As of September 2019, Metro has the third largest bus fleet in North America with 2,320 buses, behind New York City's Metropolitan Transportation Authority (5,825) and New Jersey's NJ Transit (3,003). Metro operates the nation's largest fleet of compressed natural gas powered buses.

Metro electrified its G line BRT in 2021 using New Flyer XE60 vehicles along with on-route charging at the line's termini. This was undone in June 2024. It is in the process of receiving BYD K9M-ER vehicles which are undergoing delivery procedures and acceptance testing, slated to be used on the J line. These buses have been subject to numerous delays, technical noncompliance, and quality control issues, which has led Metro levying liquidated damages against BYD for failure to meet contract terms.

In April 2024, Metro released a procurement Request for Proposals for zero-emissions buses including hydrogen fuel cell vehicles and battery electric vehicles. The board also approved a motion directing Metro CEO Stephanie Wiggins and her staff to report to the board in September with an updated, more comprehensive and accountable plan to decarbonize the agency's bus fleet. These efforts were followed by the reversal of the G line's electrification, which had been a significant achievement in the agency's troubled history of attempting to electrify its bus fleet. Metro staff canceled the bus procurement in November 2025 due to safety, schedule, and cost concerns.

Metro is slated to receive buses over the next few years from five sources. Firstly, Metro is relying on donated vehicles from other agencies to support increased transit operations for the 2028 Los Angeles Summer Olympics, with ambitions to more than double its fleet size. However, as of June 2025, Metro has only received commitments from donor agencies for up to 650 of the 2700 buses that would be needed to support the Olympic games.

As of November 2025, Metro is pursuing four additional sources of bus deliveries as opposed to its initially planned procurement, including

1. Procuring forty 40-foot battery-electric buses through a cooperative State purchase agreement in use in either Washington or Colorado for more immediate delivery
2. Re-issuing its RFP with updated specifications and to a wider market audience of potential bidders for 240 battery electric buses and options for 1600 more
3. Pilot with an international bus manufacturer for ten 40-foot extended-range battery electric buses, and ten 60-foot extended-range battery electric buses, with options for sixty additional buses
4. Procure 20 hydrogen fuel cell electric buses through a separate procurement or cooperative State purchase agreement

=== Active fleet ===
Make/Model	Fleet numbers	Picture	Year	Engine	Transmission	§ Divisions	Notes
NABI 60-BRT CNG	9500–9594		2007–2008	Cumnins Westport ISL-G	Allison B500R	1, 5, 7, 13, 15, 18	
NABI 31-LFW CNG	3100–3149		2010	Cummins Westport ISL-G	Allison B300R	MV, STI	Some units sold and others scrapped; soon to retire completely; Strictly contractor operated
NABI Metro 45C CNG	8100–8400		2008-2009	Cummins Westport ISL G NZ Cummins Westport L9N	Allison B400R	1, 7, 8, 9, 15, 18, STI	All 8100s retired Most 8200s retired except 8217 Half of the 8300s are retired Some units in Metro liner livery
NABI Metro 45C CNG	8401–8491		2010–2011	Cummins Westport L9N	Allison B400R	3, 7, 8, 13, 18, STI	Unit 8463 is the only bus with its original Cummins Westport ISL G engine
NABI Metro 45C CNG	8500–8649		2012–2013	Cummins Westport L9N	Allison B400R	1, 3, 7, 13, 18	Unit 8648 is in Metro Liner Livery (Sliver Line)
NABI Metro 40C CNG (40CLFW-NOH)	8650		2012	Cummins Westport ISL G	Allison B400R	CMF	Used for training; The only Metro 40C model ever produced
New Flyer XN40	5600-5603		2013	Cummins Westport ISL G Cummins Westport L9N	Allison B400R	5, 7, MV	
New Flyer XN40	5604–6000		2014	Cummins Westport ISL G Cummins Westport L9N	Allison B400R	1, 2, 3, 5, 7, 8, 9, 13, 15, 18, MV, STI	Some units have begun their mid-life rehab
New Flyer XN40	3850–4199 6001–6149		2015–2016	Cummins Westport ISL G Cummins Westport L9N	Allison B400R	1, 2, 3, 5, 7, 8, 9, 13, 15, 18, MV	Some units have begun their mid-life rehab; 4172 no longer has its ISL-G NZ Engine; Some units in the Metro Liner Livery
New Flyer XN60	8700–8764		2018–2019	Cummins Westport L9N	Allison B500R	13, 15, 18	
New Flyer XN60	8765–8834		2020–2021	Cummins Westport L9N	Allison B500R	1, 5, 7, 13, 15, 18	Unit No. 8825 was destroyed in a fire on October 31, 2024, and has been retired
ENC Axess BRT 40’ CNG	1505–1799		2018–2020	Cummins Westport L9N	Allison B400R	1, 3, 8, 9, 15, 18, MV	Units 1565, 1568, and 1569 sustained severe damage on May 27, 2020, in a fire inside a bus yard and have been retired; Unit 1614 sustained severe damage in a collision with an SUV in Chatsworth on September 15, 2026, which resulted in two fatalities
ENC Axess BRT 40’ CNG	1800–2061		2020–2022	Cummins Westport L9N	Allison B400R	1, 3, 8, 9, 15, 18, MV	
New Flyer XE60	19500–19539		2019–2020	Siemens ELFA2	XALT Energy	8	Used on G Line; Replaced all Metro Liner NABI 60-BRT units
BYD K11M	19000–19004		2020			8	Used on G Line
BYD K9MD	10000–10004		2021			9, 18	Used on J Line and local service
BYD K9MD	10005-10099		2024			1, 2, 3, 9, 18	42 units to be assigned to the J line; Some units being delivered, others entering service currently or undergoing acceptance testing; These units are extended range ER models; 10000-10049 painted in silver Metro Liner livery, 10050-10099 in poppy orange Metro Bus livery; 10056 made its debut on route 2 on December 19, 2025; D1, D2, D3, and D15 each have 5 50kW slow overnight chargers for these buses

=== Future ===
==== Temporary fleet for 2028 Summer Olympics ====
Make/Model	Fleet numbers	Year	Engine	Transmission	Notes
New Flyer XN40	(10 buses)	2011	Cumnins Westport ISL-G	Voith D864.5	Donated by the Centre Area Transportation Authority in 2025.; Buses 3 and 10 are confirmed to have been donated.

==== Bus acquisitions ====
Make/Model	Quantity	Length	Powertrain	Status/Timeline	Notes
Ebusco 3.0	1	40 foot	Battery Electric	Shadow service pilot launching March 2026	First international OEM pilot; First new composite-bodied bus for LA Metro since 2012 NABIs
New Flyer XE40	19	40 foot	Battery Electric	In process of being donated to LA Metro	Ex Lane Transit District 22101-22119 donated due to cold weather challenges in Oregon; These buses are 2022 and 2023 model years; Metro to repaint and refit these buses for revenue service
TBD	220	40 foot	Battery Electric	Award to be issued by April 2026, delivery in 2027	Funding secured; Authorized purchase through Washington or Colorado state cooperative procurement contracts; New Flyer, Gillig, and BYD are qualified vendors producing 40-ft electric transit buses in WA; NFI and Gillig are preferred in WA contract; NFI has a multi-year backlog of nearly 16,000 buses which may not meet Metro's schedule requirements for Olympics service and CNG bus retirement; BYD likely disqualified due to poor performance and schedule adherence in previous Metro procurement
TBD	240	TBD	Battery Electric	Award to be issued by July 2026	Funding secured; Re-issued procurement based on April 2024 RFP; New technical specs; Two bidding opportunities; Base purchase quantity of 240 buses with options of up to 1600 BEBs
TBD	10	40 foot	Battery Electric	Not funded	Extra long range technology pilot; Polish bus manufacturer Solaris is in the process of entering the US market and is piloting its 40-foot Urbino 12 and its 60-foot Urbino 18 with Washington's King County Metro and San Francisco's MUNI
TBD	10	60 foot	Battery Electric	Not funded	Extra long range technology pilot; Polish bus manufacturer Solaris is in the process of entering the US market and is piloting its 40-foot Urbino 12 and its 60-foot Urbino 18 with Washington's King County Metro and San Francisco's MUNI
TBD	20	TBD	Hydrogen Fuel Cell Electric	Not Funded	Either separate procurement or cooperative procurement contracts

=== Preserved Legacy Fleet ===
Bus Number	Bus Image	Model	Year Operated	Year Retired	Year of Preservation/Status
4408	4408 LAMTA peserved 2026	RTS-GMC	1982	Retired circa 2006-2008.	Repainted in the Metro Local scheme in 2004-2005. Retained by CMF after retirement; it is currently undergoing restoration as part of preservation for the LA Metro historical fleet.

=== Retired ===
Make/Model	Length	Picture	Year	Retirement Year	Fleet numbers (quantity ordered)	Paint Schemes	Propulsion
Grumman Flxible 870	40 foot		1980	1990-1993	7500-7729 (229 buses)	RTD Tri-Shape Yellow Jacket	Diesel
GMC RTS-04 (T8J-204)	40 foot		1980-81	2001	0023-0025 (3 buses)	Purple Connector	Diesel
GMC RTS-04 (T8J-204)	40 foot		1980-81	1998-2001	8200-9139 (939 buses)	ATE Ryder RTD Tri-Stripe Yellow Jacket	Diesel
GMC RTS-04 (T8J-204)	40 foot		1983	2001	4452-4471 (20 buses)	Blank	Diesel
Neoplan USA AN122/3 Skyliner	40 foot		1981	1994-95	9902-9921 (19 buses)	RTD Tri-Stripe	Diesel
GMC RTS-04 (T7J-604)	35 foot		1982	2006-08	4400-4434 (34 buses)	Yellow Jacket Metro Local	Diesel
Gillig Phantom	35 foot		1983	2000	805213 (1 bus)	Yellow Jacket	Diesel
Neoplan USA AN440A	40 foot		1983-84	2001	3300-3714 (314 buses)	Yellow Jacket	Diesel
Neoplan USA AN440A/3	40 foot		1987	2001	1100-1189 (89 buses)	Yellow Jacket	Diesel
Ford Econoline 350	25 foot		1989	1995-1996	0006 (1 bus)	Yellow Jacket	Diesel
TMC RTS-06 (T80-206)	40 foot		1988	2006-07	2000-2266 (266 buses	Yellow Jacket Metro Local	Diesel
TMC RTS-06 (T80-206)	40 foot		1989	2007	1970-1999 (30 buses)	Yellow Jacket Metro Local	Diesel
TMC RTS-06 (T80-206)	40 foot		1989	2008	2300-2402 (102 buses)	Yellow Jacket	Diesel
TMC RTS-06 (T80-206)	40 foot		1992	2008-2009	1200-1502 (302 buses)	Yellow Jacket; Metro Local	Diesel
TMC RTS-06 (T80-206)	40 foot		1993	2015	2006 (1 bus)	None	Diesel
Flxible Metro B	40 foot		1988	2002	2500-2649 (149 buses)	Yellow Jacket	Diesel
Flxible Metro B	40 foot		1989	2002	2700-2764 (64 buses)	Yellow Jacket	Diesel
Flxible Metro B	40 foot		1990	2002	2800-2870 (70 buses)	Yellow Jacket	Diesel
Flxible Metro B	40 foot		1992	2005	2900-2932 (32 buses)	Yellow Jacket	Diesel
Gillig Phantom	40 foot		1988	2002	19088, 19097, 19098, 19101, 19102, 19115, 19126, 19127 (8 buses)	Yellow Jacket	Diesel
Gillig Phantom	40 foot		1989	2003	9977 (1 bus)	Metro Local	Diesel
Gillig Phantom	40 foot		1993-94	2015	9978-9980 (3 buses)	Metro Local	Diesel
Gillig Phantom	40 foot		1991	2000	813-817 (4 buses)	None	Diesel
Gillig Phantom	40 foot		1994	2004	9976 (1 bus)	Metro Local	Diesel
Flxible Metro B CNG	40 foot		1989	2001-02	1800-1809 (9 buses)	Tri Stripe	CNG
Gillig Spirit	28 foot		1990	1999	600 (1 bus)	Yellow Jacket	Diesel
Gillig Phantom	40 foot		1994	2006	1000-1010 (10 buses)	None	Diesel
Neoplan USA AN440	40 foot		1995-96	2008	4500-4695 (195 buses)	Metro Local	CNG
Neoplan USA AN440	40 foot		1996-97	2008-09	4696-4793 (97 buses)	Metro Local	CNG
Neoplan USA AN440	40 foot		1997-98	2013-2014	6301-6600 (299 buses)	Metro Local	CNG
Neoplan USA AN440	40 foot		1999	2013	6700-6799 (100 buses)	Metro Local	CNG
New Flyer D30LF	30 foot		1997-98	2010	9981-9983 (3 buses)	Metro Local	Diesel
New Flyer D40LF	40 foot		1998	2010	3000-3019 (19 buses)	Metro Local	Diesel
New Flyer C40HF	40 foot		1999-2000	2014	5000-5222 (222 buses)	Metro Local	CNG
NABI 40-LFW	40 foot		1999-2000	2019-2020	7000-7214 (215 buses)	Metro Local Metro Rapid Metro Express	CNG
NABI 40-LFW	40 foot		2000-01	2016-20	7300-7514 (215 buses)	Metro Local Metro Rapid	CNG
NABI 40-LFW	40 foot		2001-02	2018-21	7600-7949 (350 buses)	Metro Local Metro Rapid	CNG
NABI 40-LFW	40 foot		2005	2019-20	7525-7599 (75 buses)	Metro Local Metro Rapid	CNG
New Flyer C40LF	40 foot		2000-01	2019-20	5300-5522 (223 buses)	Yellow Jacket Metro Local Metro Rapid Metro Express	CNG
Orion VI	40 foot		2000-01	2019	11001-11067 (67 buses)	Metro Local	Diesel
Thomas TL960	40 foot		2001	2011	9950-9969 (19 buses)	Metro Local	Diesel
Blue Bird CSRE 3703	37 foot		2001	2010	9970-9975 (5 buses)	Metro Local	Diesel
ElDorado National MST II	32 foot		2002	2009	12501-12536 (35 buses)	Yellow Jacket	Diesel
ElDorado National E-Z Rider II	30 foot		2003	2013	12556-12570 (14 buses)	Metro Local	Propane
NABI 40C-LFW	40 foot		2002-03	2015	7980-7999 (20 buses)	Metro Local Metro Rapid	CNG
NABI 45C-LFW	45 foot		2003-2004	2019-20	8000-8099	Metro Local Metro Rapid Metro Liner	CNG
NABI 60-BRT	60 foot		2004-06	2020	9200-9399 (200 buses)	Metro Local Metro Rapid Metro Liner	CNG
NABI 60-BRT	60 foot 65 foot (9495 only)		2006-07	2021-2022	9400-9495 (96 buses)	Metro Local Metro Rapid Metro Liner	CNG
NABI 42-BRT	42 foot		2008-09	2023	4200-4205 (6 buses)	Metro Local	Gasoline-Electric
BYD K9	39 foot		2014	2016	1001-1005 (5 buses)	Metro Local	Electric

== Liveries ==
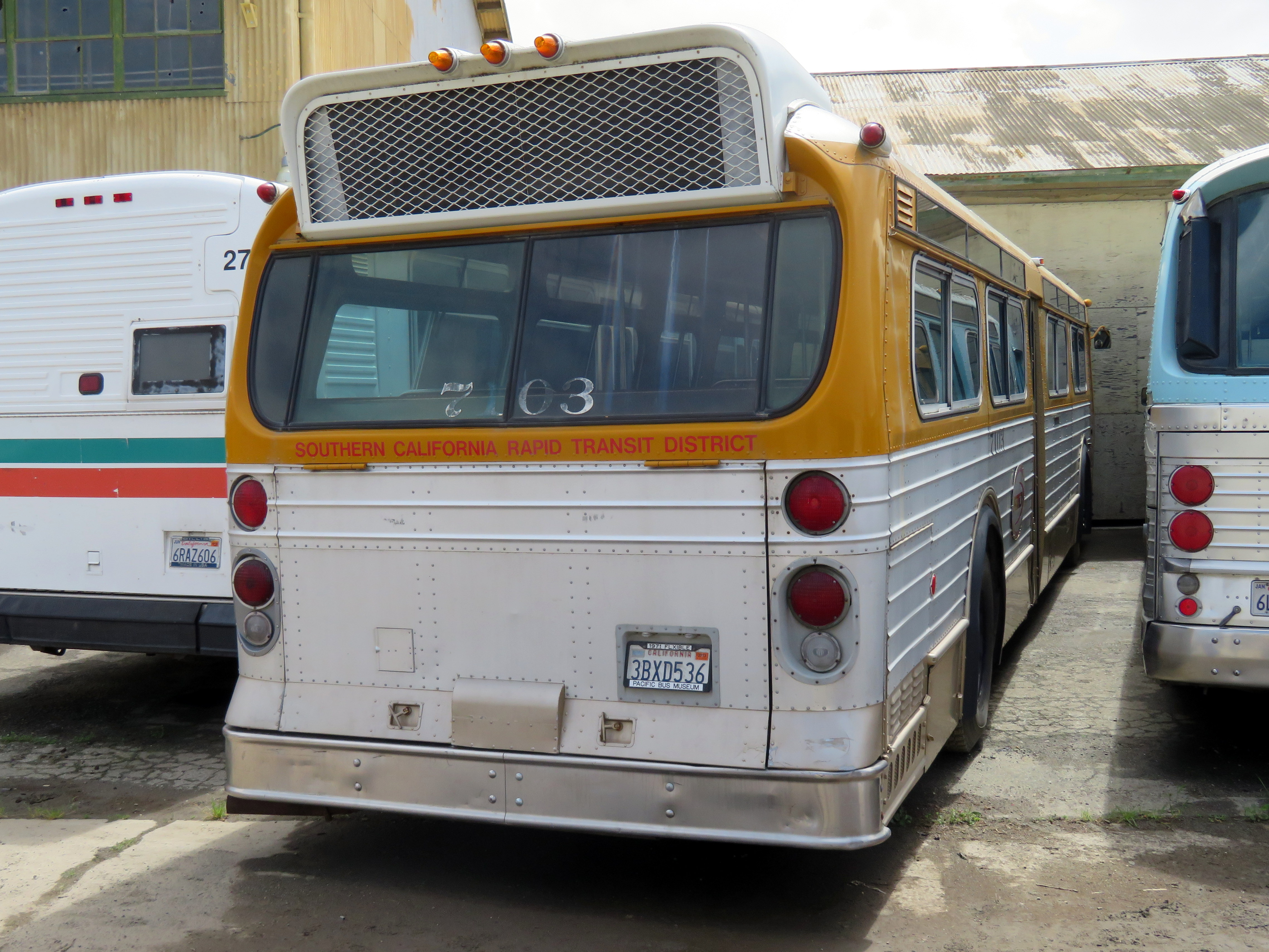
RTD Copperhead (Flxible New Look)

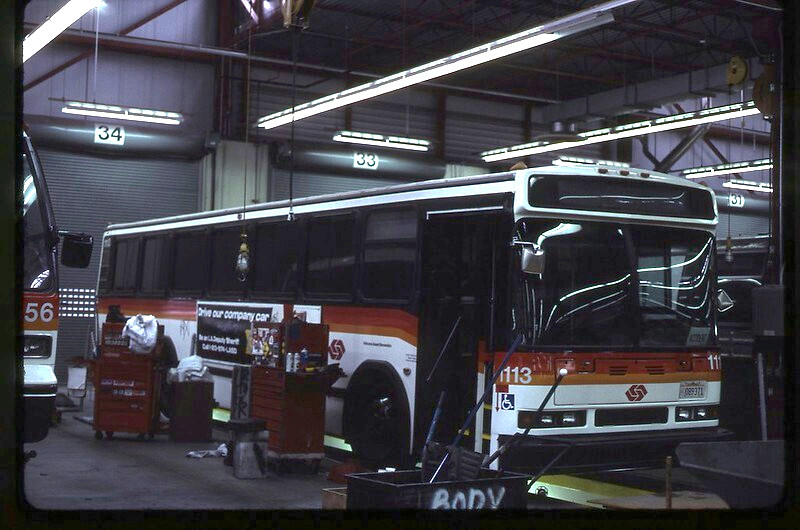
RTD Tri-Stripe (Neoplan AN440)

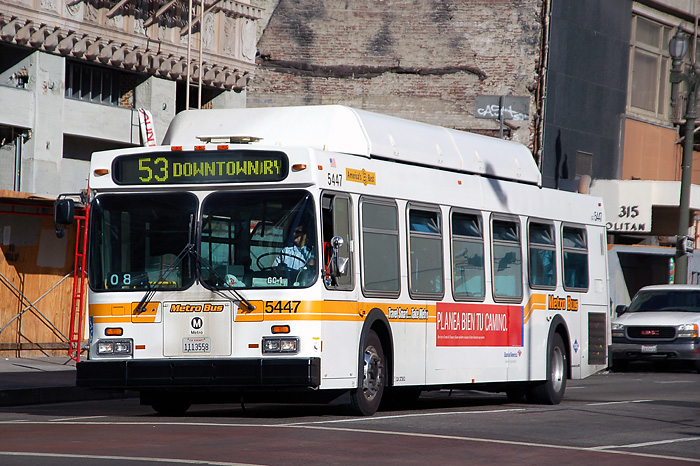
Metro Yellow Jacket (New Flyer C40LF)

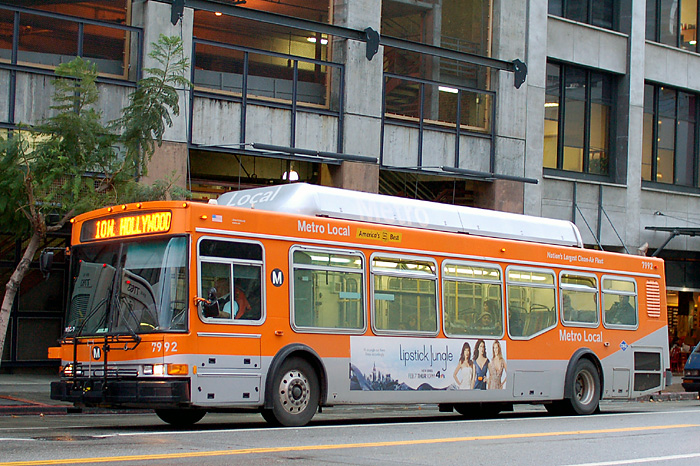
Metro Local (NABI 40C-LFW)

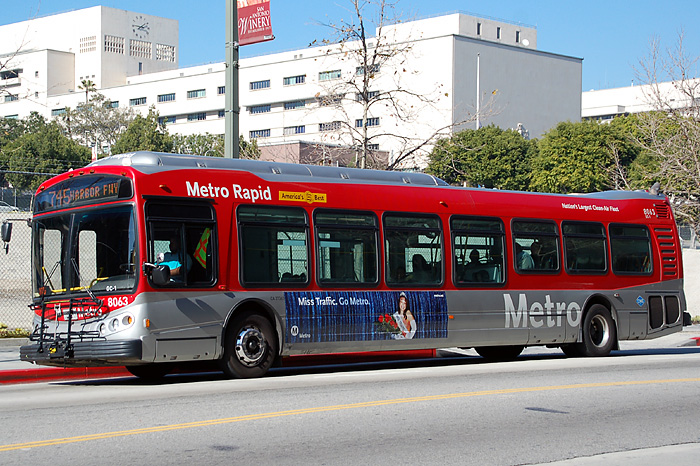
Metro Rapid (NABI 45C-LFW)

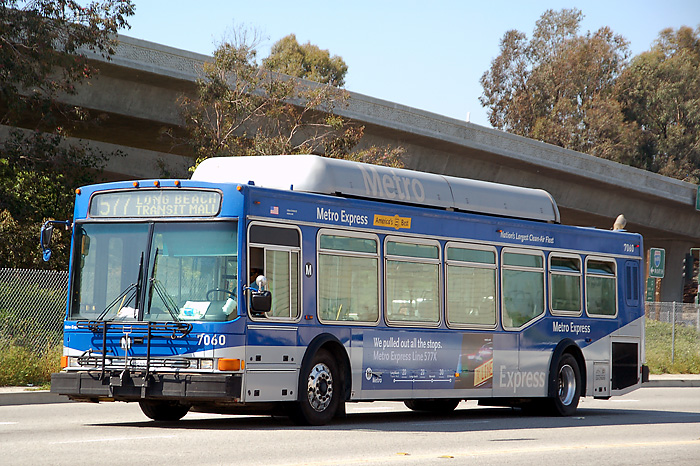
Metro Express (NABI 40-LFW)

Metro Liner (NABI 60-BRT)

=== Predecessors ===
In 1971, RTD took delivery of the first units of its Flxible New Look fleet, painted in a "Copperhead" livery which RTD described as "orange and champagne". The livery, as implemented on its GM and Flxible "New Look" fleet, had the window area painted in ochre yellow and the lower body and front painted in champagne/copper, separated by a broad silver or white stripe down the sides. When RTD introduced a 25 cent flat-fare program in 1974, some of the reserve buses pressed into service were painted a plain white instead of "Copperhead". In 1976, the existing GM Old Look bus fleet were repainted in the new "Copperhead" livery. RTD introduced an "Express" livery in 1977, colored yellow, white, and black, with a broad wedge-shaped stripe down the side.

RTD introduced the "Tri-Stripe" livery in March 1980, designed by Saul Bass and Herb Yager, starting with the existing Grumman/Flxible 870 fleet and continuing with the Rapid Transit Series scheduled for delivery in October 1980. Under this scheme, the window area was painted black and the base was painted white, separated by red, orange, and yellow stripes. The Bass/Yager firm was engaged to rebrand the agency, including a new logo, in June 1979 after the increase in ridership driven by the 1979 oil crisis proved that many residents were unfamiliar with RTD. The oldest "Old Look", which was also the first diesel bus to operate in Los Angeles starting from 1950, was retired with the delivery of the last RTS in June 1981. Most of the existing "New Look" fleet was repainted in the Bass/Yager "Tri-Stripe" livery by August 1984. "Tri-Stripe" was simplified in the early 1990s to facilitate graffiti removal.

=== Initial stripe schemes ===
Buses inherited from RTD generally carried over a simplified "RTD Tri-Stripe" livery; the base color of the bus was white (including the window area) with a triple-stacked stripe of red, orange, and yellow extending from the base of the windshield down the sides of the bus, carried below the side windows. This was simplified to "Red Stripe", white with a double-stacked stripe of red and yellow in the same position, and "Yellow Jacket" in 1997, white with a double-stacked gold stripe in the same position, featuring a stylized text logo "Metro Bus" prominently on the front and sides of the bus.

=== Service livery ===
Starting in the early 2000s, the "Metro Service" livery was implemented under the leadership of creative director Michael Lejeune and lead designer Neil Sadler. The base color of buses, visible on the lower edge and the extended roof cap for CNG storage, was Silver / Pantone 877 C metallic, supplemented by a broad stripe starting just below the side windows and extending to the top of the bus, denoting the service type:

- Metro Local: Local poppy / Pantone 158 C for local service
- Metro Rapid: Rapid red / Pantone 193 C for rapid (limited) service
- Metro Express: Express blue / Pantone 286 C for express (freeway) service
- Metro Liner: Liner silver / Pantone 8401 C for bus rapid transit lines

The colors are supplemented by text restating the service type in the FF Scala Sans typeface, bold weight. This branding scheme won an honor award from the Society for Experiential Graphic Design in 2007. Since then, the Express services have been scaled back and the colors have been modified.

=== Simplification ===
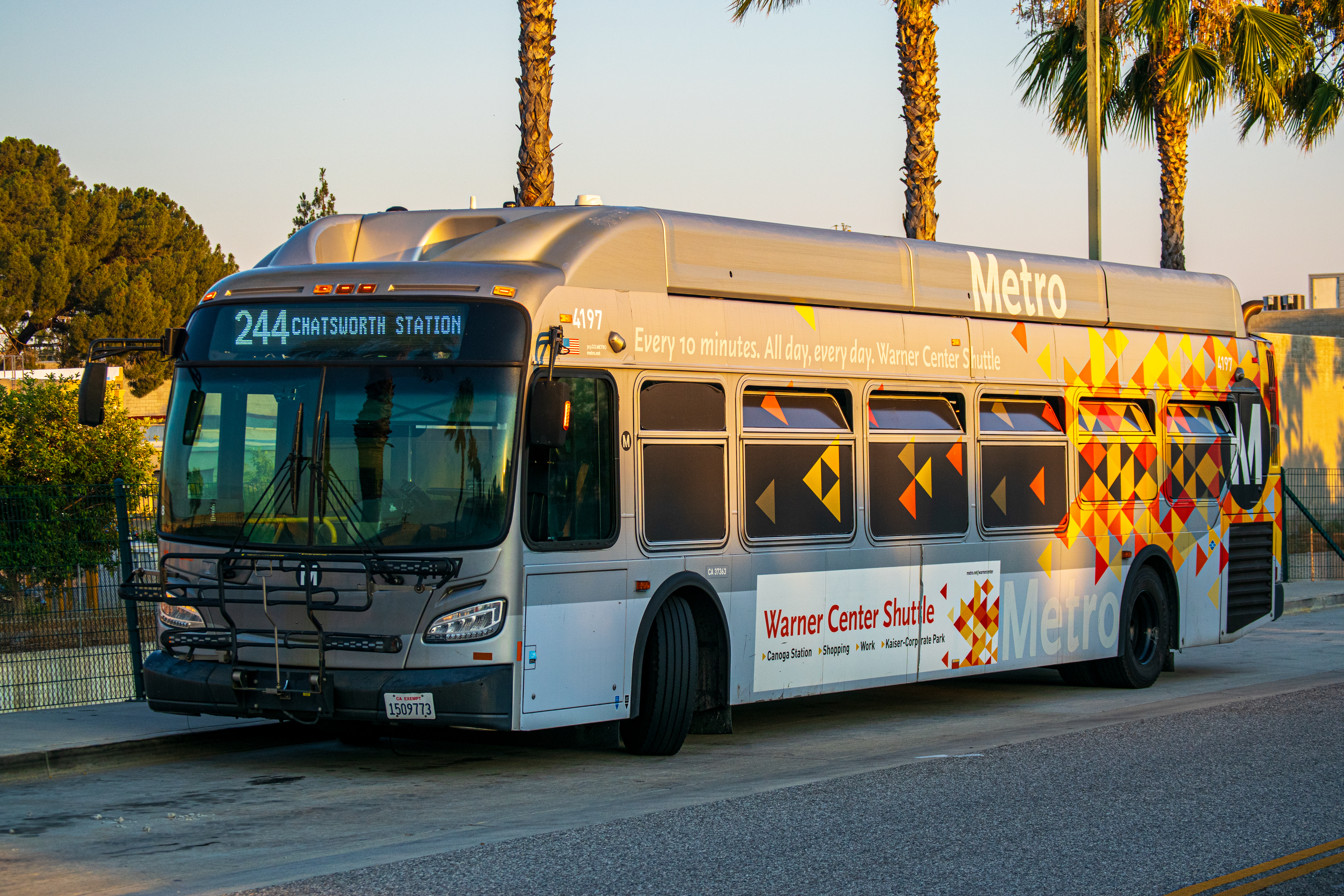
New Flyer XN40 with simplified livery, Warner Center shuttle service (route 601)

Typically, the supplemental text agree with the livery, such as Metro Local used with the Poppy Orange color. However, as of late 2020, Metro dropped the text specification for newer buses and those undergoing their midlife refit. Since then, beginning with the second batch of New Flyer XN60s delivered in 2020-2021 and newer (buses 8765 and newer), buses are now simply labeled "Metro Bus" echoing the "Yellow Jacket" livery while buses still retain the "Service" color distinctions for local, rapid, and liner liveries. New Flyer XE60s used to replace the G Line fleet and convert it to zero-emissions operation were delivered before this change in late 2020, and as such, use a "Go Metro" label not found on other buses. Other buses feature a large text "Go Metro" on their roof rails, however not as a bus label such as "Metro Rapid", "Metro Local", or "Metro Bus". Since then, BYD K-series vehicles on the J line and newer buses have adopted the "Metro Bus" labels, defining that label as the preferred option moving forward.

The XE60s that replaced the NABI Metro Liners on the G (Orange) line dropped the orange accents and text colors so they could be used elsewhere without too much confusion. Although there are currently no other divisions or lines that are equipped with the required supporting infrastructure, Metro may need to expand capacity by adding larger, potentially double-articulated vehicles for the G line, as the line is at capacity and needs an upgrade before its eventual conversion to light rail. Thus, the flexible branding enables Metro to reassign the XE60s currently being used for the G line without needing to take them out of service for re-brands.

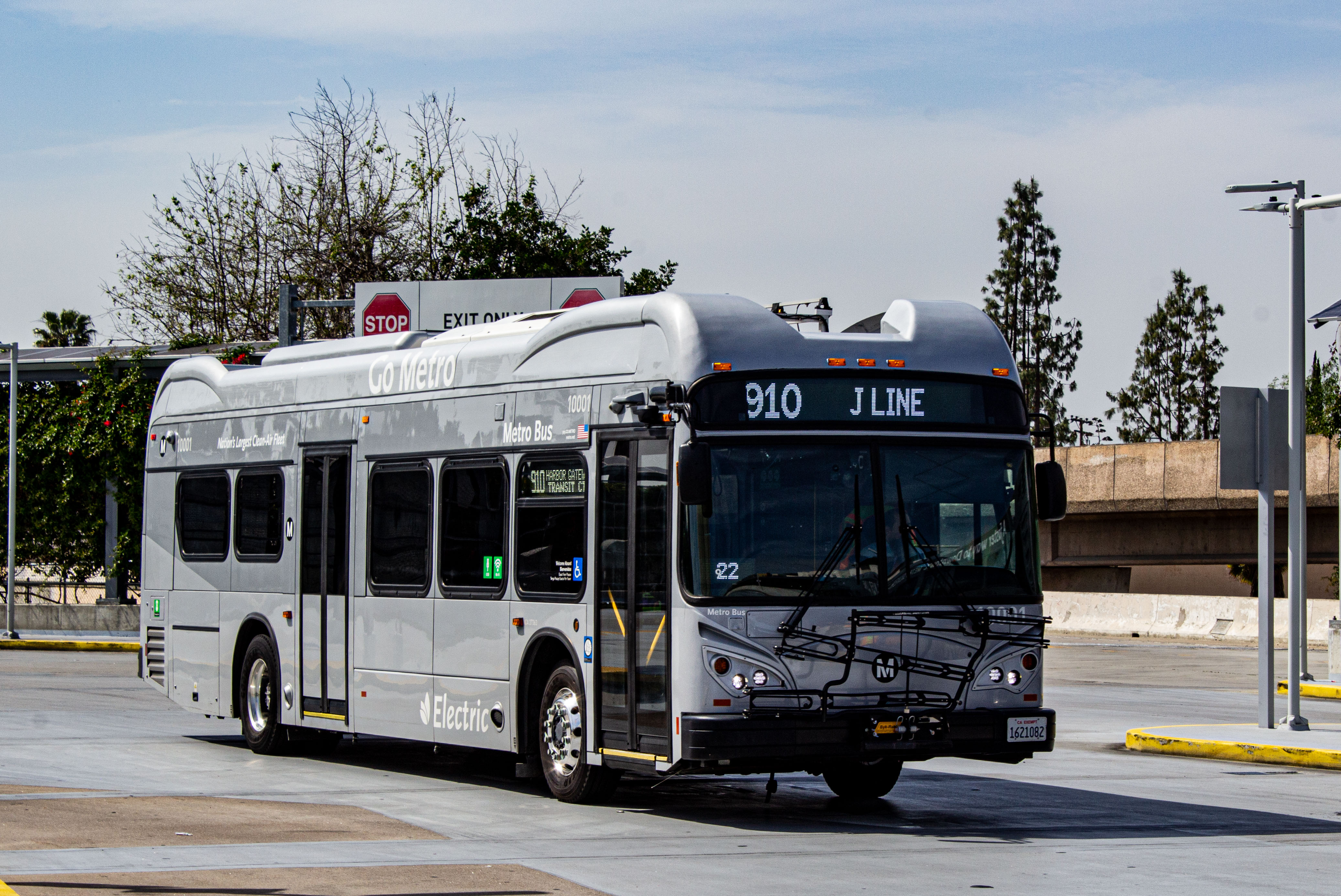
BYD K9M with simplified "Go Metro" livery in J line service

With the same logic, new J (Silver) line buses are no longer branded with the tagline "A faster way to downtown" as old J line buses are entering service on other routes such as the 2 with the addition of BYD K9Ms to electrify the J line and the fact that new electric busway-designated buses are also sometimes used on inaugural runs of new routes such as the 33 in addition to local service and thus don't feature exclusive branding to the busway line the bus is normally usually assigned to.

== Metro Bus & Rail divisions ==
Operating divisions of Los Angeles Metro
- Bus
- Non-revenue / closed
- Rail (A)
- Rail (B/D)
- Rail (C)
- Rail (E)
- Rail (K)
1 Downtown LA / Central City
2 Downtown LA / Crossroads Depot
3 Cypress Park
4 Non-revenue (Downey)
5 Arthur Winston
6 Venice
7 West Hollywood
8 Chatsworth / West Valley
9 El Monte
10 Los Angeles
11 Metro A Line (Long Beach)
12 Inactive vehicles (Long Beach)
13 Downtown LA
14 Metro E Line (Santa Monica)
15 Sun Valley
16 Metro C/K Line (Westchester)
17 Maple Terminal
18 South Bay
19 El Monte station
20 Metro B/D Line (Los Angeles River)
21 Metro E Line (Elysian Park)
22 Metro K Line (Hawthorne)
23 La Veranda Apartments
24 Metro A Line (Monrovia)

Under the Metro governance structure, the routes operating out of each division are supervised by an integrated/centralized operations division with oversight provided by one of five Service Councils covering a distinct geographical region of Los Angeles County. Each Service Council has a three-letter abbreviation.

Service Councils
Council	Abbv	Region	Cities († council meeting site)
Gateway Cities	GWC	southeast	Artesia, Avalon, Bell, Bellflower, Bell Gardens, Cerritos, Commerce, Compton, Cudahy, Downey, Hawaiian Gardens, †Huntington Park, La Habra Heights, Lakewood, La Mirada, Long Beach, Lynwood, Maywood, Norwalk, Paramount, Pico Rivera, Santa Fe Springs, Signal Hill, South Gate, Vernon, Walnut Park, Whittier
San Fernando Valley	SFV	northwest	Agoura Hills, Burbank, Calabasas, Glendale, Hidden Hills, Los Angeles (valley area incl. †Van Nuys), San Fernando Westlake Village
San Gabriel Valley	SGV	northeast	Alhambra, Altadena, Arcadia, Baldwin Park, Covina, Diamond Bar, Duarte, East Los Angeles, †El Monte, Industry, Irwindale, La Cañada Flintridge, La Puente, Monrovia, Montebello, Monterey Park, Pasadena, Pomona, Rosemead, San Gabriel, San Marino, Sierra Madre, South El Monte, South Pasadena, Temple City, Walnut, West Covina
South Bay	SBC (SBA)	southwest	Carson, El Segundo, Gardena, Hawthorne, Hermosa Beach, Inglewood, Lawndale, †Lennox, Lomita, Los Angeles (Harbor City, Harbor Gateway, San Pedro and Wilmington), Manhattan Beach, Palos Verdes Estates, Rancho Palos Verdes, Redondo Beach, Rolling Hills, Rolling Hills Estates, Torrance, Westchester
Westside/Central	WSC (WES)	west & central	Beverly Hills, Culver City, †Los Angeles, Malibu, Santa Monica, West Hollywood

Each Service Council is composed of elected officials, appointed representatives, and transit users from a given area served by each division. While the Councils have geographical boundaries, in practice they only define where the members come from, as most of Los Angeles is served by routes operating out of multiple sectors. For instance, the former Olympic Boulevard Rapid bus was operated by buses from the San Gabriel Valley sector, despite its entire route being in the Westside or Central Los Angeles areas.

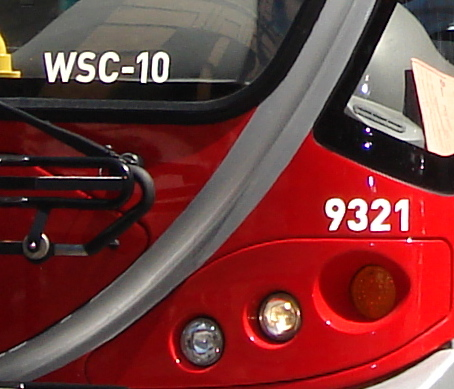
Detail at the base of the driver's-side windshield, declaring the bus fleet number (9321), service council ('WSC' for Westside/Central), and operating division (10)

Decals with service sector abbreviations and division numbers are affixed to the windows of Metro buses. A list of routes operating from each sector can be found in the Service Council Bylaws.

Division 3 in Cypress Park is the oldest bus yard owned by Metro, operating since 1907. About 200 buses currently operate out of the yard.

The following table lists all current bus divisions (rail divisions are not included):

Operating Metro bus divisions
Number	Name	Sector
1	Central City	Gateway Cities
2	Crossroads Depot	Gateway Cities
3	North Los Angeles, Cypress Park	San Gabriel Valley
4	(non-revenue vehicles)	Gateway Cities
5	Arthur Winston/Mid-Cities	South Bay
7	West Hollywood	Westside/Central
8	West Valley	San Fernando Valley
9	El Monte, San Gabriel Valley	San Gabriel Valley
10	East Los Angeles (all retiring vehicles, construction staging for other divisions)	Gateway Cities
13	Downtown Los Angeles	Central Maintenance Facility (CMF)
15	East Valley	San Fernando Valley
18	South Bay	South Bay

Division 10 was closed for revenue service during the COVID-19 pandemic in September 2020. Vehicles were reassigned, however Metro has kept the property. It will be used to store other buses when their respective divisions are being equipped for zero-emissions revenue service. Due to the nature of the upgrades required at each division, some divisions may need to temporarily relocate their current CNG buses to have enough space for construction.

=== Electrification ===
As mandated by both the California Air Resources Board's ICT regulation and the agency's own board, Metro is electrifying its bus fleet, which requires upgrades to its operating divisions to support charging infrastructure. Division 9, located in El Monte, is slated to be the agency's first fully electric operating division. Construction is slated to finish in Q1 2026, but the facility will still operate Compressed Natural Gas buses until 2028 at the earliest as Metro will not have enough electric buses to use at Division 9 until new vehicles begin arriving from the agency's regional procurement. Many of the BYD K9M and K9M-ER buses are being assigned to Division 9, while the rest are being assigned to Division 18.

Divisions 18 and 7 will follow next, which are scheduled to be completed in 2028. They will benefit from the arrival of new buses in Metro's Regional Procurement.

The following table lists Metro's Division electrification schedule, which as of July 2025, it is on track to meet.

Electrification Schedule
Division	Scheduled Completion Date	Notes
9	2026	First bus depot to be fully electrified, will operate CNG buses until Metro receives enough BEBs for D9's bus compliment
18	2028	To be completed before the 2028 Summer Olympics
7	2028	To be completed before the 2028 Summer Olympics
5	2030	
13	2030	
1	2032	
2	2032	
3	2034	
8	2034	
15	2036	
95	2036	No detailed timeline yet available
97	2036	No detailed timeline yet available

=== Closed divisions ===
The following table lists all former divisions.

Former Metro bus divisions
Number	Name
6	Venice
12	Long Beach
14	South Los Angeles
16	Pomona

== See also ==
- Bus transportation in California
- Los Angeles County Metropolitan Transportation Authority topics
- Los Angeles Metro Rail rolling stock
