= NABI LFW =

American low-floor transit buses

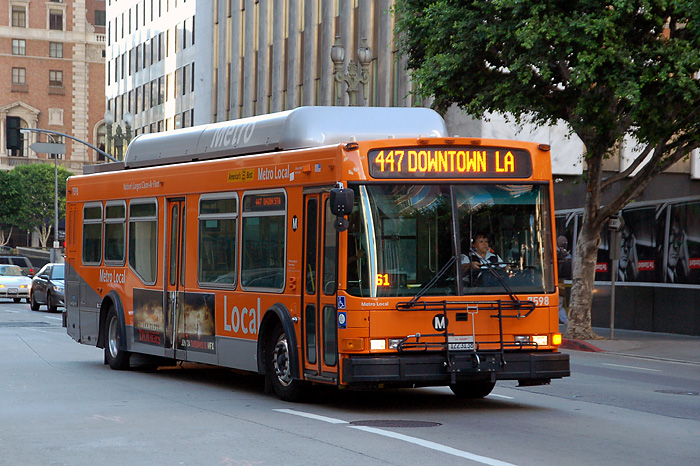
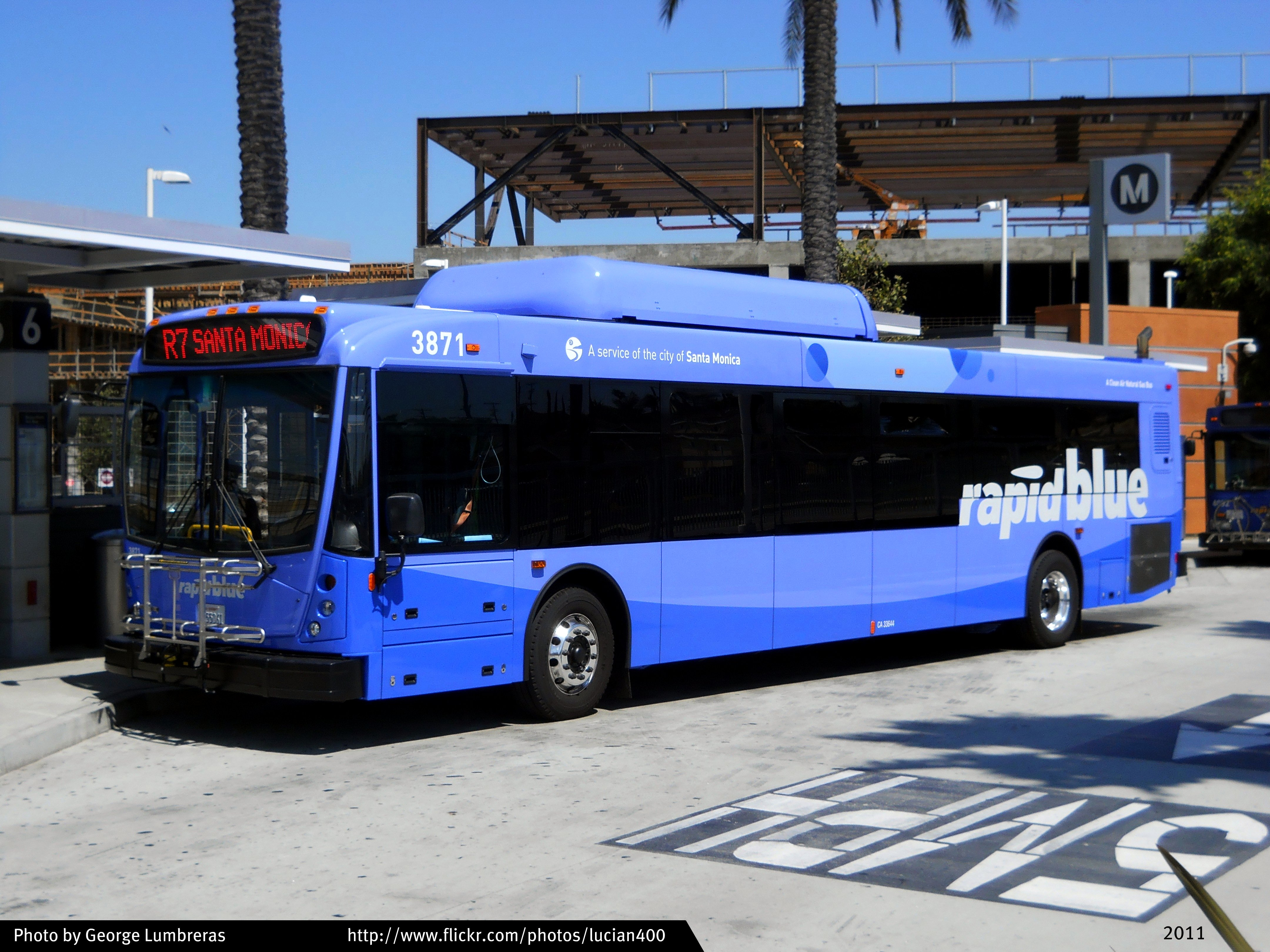
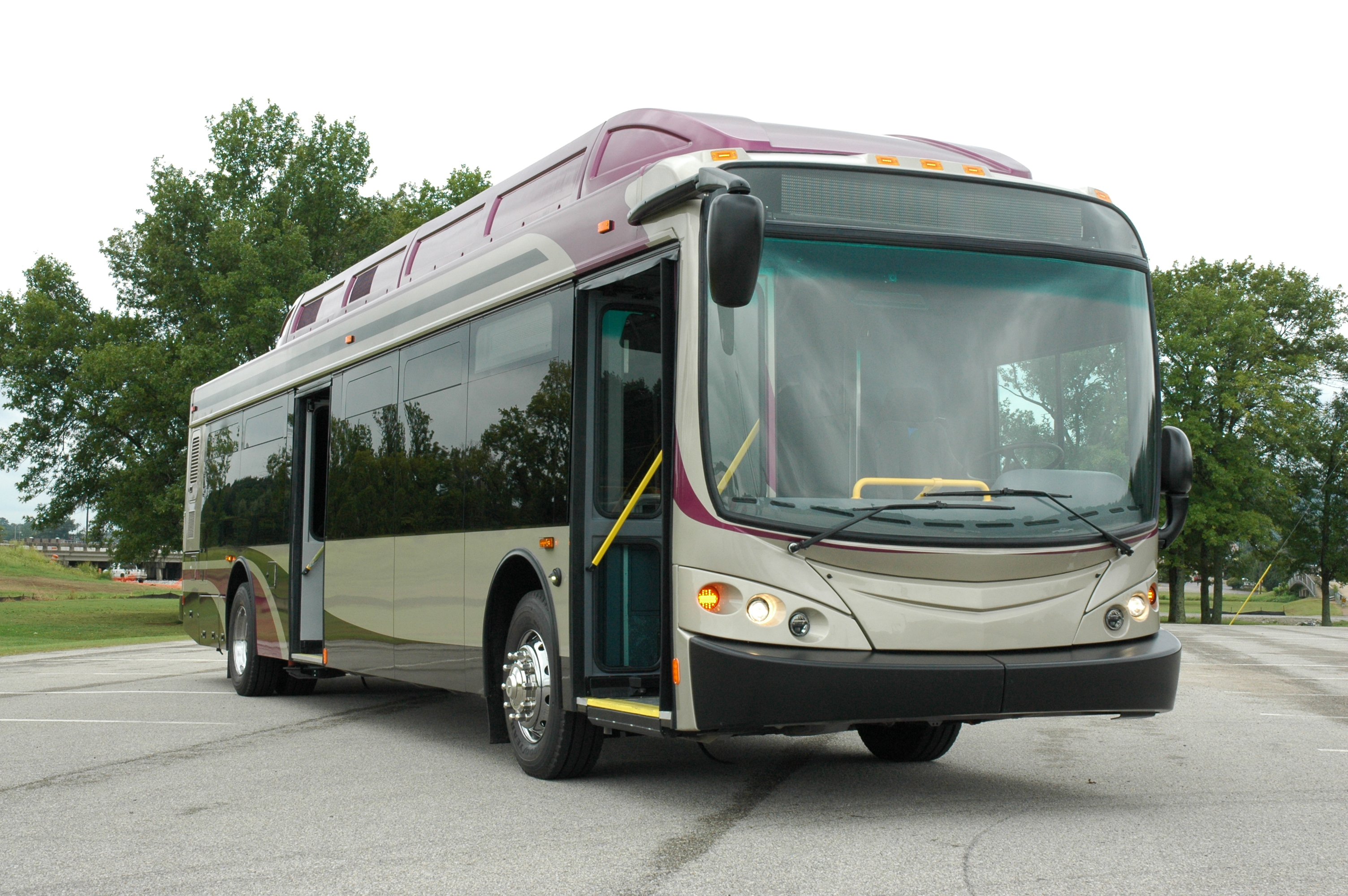
- Top: NABI 40-LFW Gen I (2008); Middle: NABI 40-LFW Gen II (2011); Bottom: NABI 40-LFW Gen III (2011)

Overview
- Manufacturer: NABI
- Production: 1997–2015

Body and chassis
- Class: Transit bus
- Body style: Monocoque
- Layout: RR
- Related: NABI CompoBus; NABI BRT

Powertrain
- Engine: Cummins; Detroit Diesel
- Transmission: Allison; ZF

Dimensions
- Wheelbase: 182 in (4.62 m) (31'); 219 in (5.56 m) (35'); 276 in (7.01 m) (40'); F:246 in (6.25 m) / R:268 in (6.81 m) (60' artic)
- Length: over bumpers: 32 ft 6 in (9.9 m) (31'); 35.8 to 36.4 ft (10.9 to 11.1 m) (35'); 40 to 40.8 ft (12.2 to 12.4 m) (40'); 60 ft (18.3 m) (60' artic)
- Width: 102 in (2.59 m)
- Height: 114 to 116 in (2.90 to 2.95 m)
- Curb weight: 27,770 to 32,120 lb (12,600 to 14,600 kg) (40'); 37,920 lb (17,200 kg) (60' artic)

Chronology
- Predecessor: NABI SFW
- Successor: New Flyer Xcelsior

The NABI LFW series is a line of low-floor transit buses that was manufactured by North American Bus Industries (NABI) from 1997 until 2015. It was offered in four nominal lengths (31', 35', 40' rigid, and 60' articulated), and with conventional diesel, LNG, and CNG combustion engines along with a diesel-electric hybrid system.

Over its production run, the LFW series was sold alongside NABI's high-floor SFW line, and the low-floor BRT and CompoBus series. The line saw major exterior redesigns in 2008 and 2011. It was discontinued in 2015, after NABI was acquired by New Flyer Industries in 2013.

== Design ==
The NABI LFW line uses a model number designating the nominal length along with the LFW family designator. For example, a NABI 40-LFW is a 40' (nominal) rigid low floor transit bus. At launch, 35-foot and 40-foot nominal lengths were announced, with the 40-LFW more popular with fixed-route transit agencies. A 60-foot articulated variant (60-LFW) was ordered in 2001. The 31-foot NABI 31-LFW was introduced with the first 'Gen II' restyle in 2008. On the stamped vehicle identification plate, the vehicle type is identified as 0xx.nn, where 0xx is the nominal length (in feet) and nn is the order number.

Despite its superficial resemblance to the preceding NABI 416 high-floor transit bus, which had been designed by Ikarus in Hungary, the NABI LFW line was designed in America. Body shells were assembled in Hungary and shipped to Alabama for finishing. In 1998, NABI announced the LFW would be available with a stainless steel frame as an option. Body production was shifted from Hungary to Anniston gradually starting in 2011; in late 2012, the transition was complete.

=== Redesigns ===
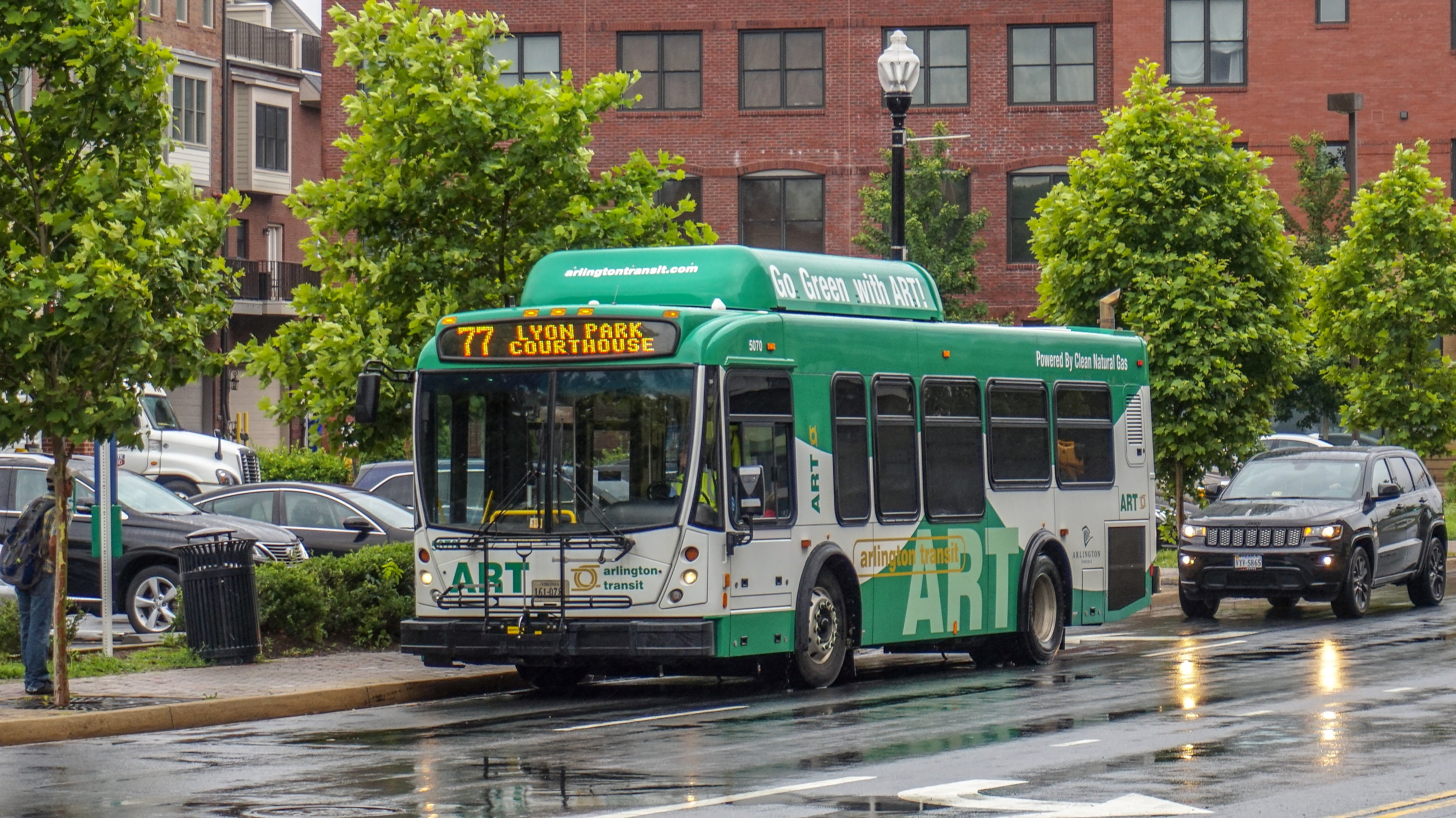
NABI 31-LFW CNG with 'Gen II' styling for Arlington Transit (2018)

The 2008 'Gen II' restyle, which added small quarter windows at the front between the windshield and the driver's side window or door, was designed to echo the styling of the NABI BRT, introduced in 2004. However, the small quarter windows could not be cleared during inclement weather and were removed in the subsequent 2011 'Gen III' restyle. The length of the front overhang grew from 86 to 95 inches (2,200 to 2,400 mm) (Gen I) to 91 to 95 inches (2,300 to 2,400 mm) (Gen II) and 95 to 99 inches (2,400 to 2,500 mm) (Gen III).

=== Hybrid ===
The 2008 restyle also brought a hybrid bus variant, with Citizens Area Transit (serving Las Vegas, Nevada) as the lead customer.

== Deployment ==
The first NABI LFW buses (40-LFW) were ordered in 1997 by Valley Metro, the transit agency serving Phoenix and Tempe, Arizona. NABI was acquired by New Flyer in 2013 and production of NABI-designed buses continued through 2015 to fill the existing backlog. The final NABI buses to be built were the 40-LFW completed in 2015 for DART, serving Dallas, Texas. After the backlog was filled, the NABI factory in Anniston, Alabama was retooled to produce New Flyer Xcelsior low-floor buses for the United States transit market.

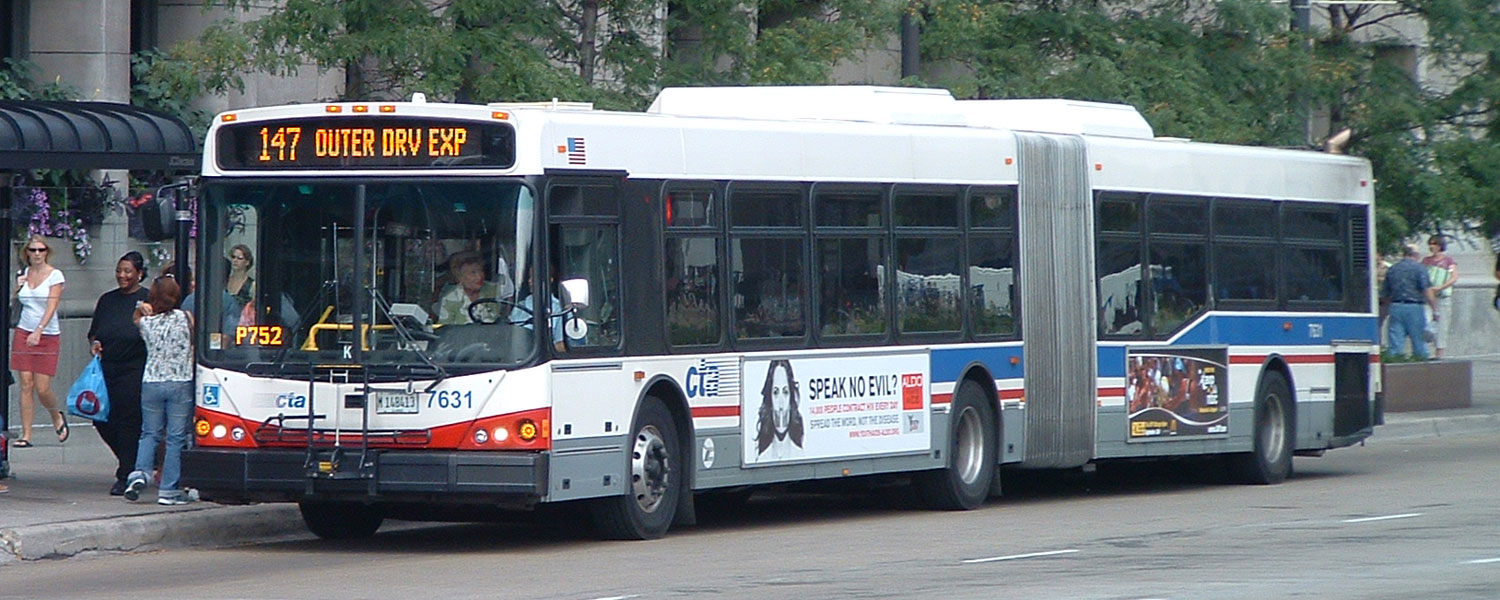
NABI 60-LFW (2005), modified 'Gen I' styling for CTA

The first (and only) order for articulated LFW buses (60-LFW) was placed by the Chicago Transit Authority (CTA) in 2001 to replace its ageing fleet of MAN SG 220 and SG 310 articulated buses. Eventually, CTA acquired 226 60-LFW buses, with deliveries starting in 2003. The NABI 60-LFW fleet proved to be problematic in service, and were pulled from service in 2009 due to cracks in the articulation joint and axles. CTA stopped payment on the contract and was sued by NABI in 2008; after filing a countersuit, CTA began scrapping the buses in 2012. The suits were eventually settled in Chicago's favor for $36.25 million.

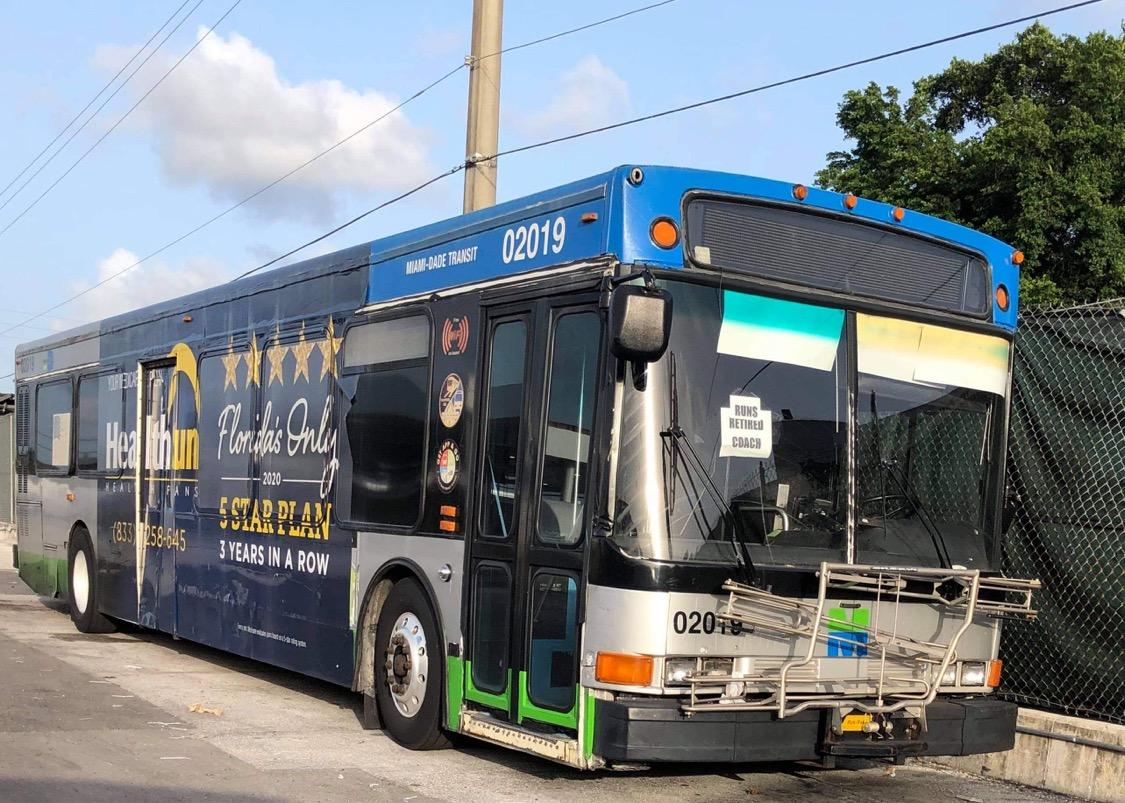
Miami-Dade Transit NABI 40-LFW 040.02 (built in 2000, photographed 2020)

Approximately 4,500 LFW buses were produced from 1998 through 2013. Most of the LFW production was for the 40-LFW model, with more than fifty orders; there were six orders for 31-LFW, 18 orders for the 35-LFW, and two orders for the 60-LFW (including one order for the bus tested at Altoona, which was later sold as part of the CTA order).

== See also ==
Competing models

- Gillig Low Floor
- Neoplan AN440L
- New Flyer Low Floor
- Nova Bus LF Series
- Orion VI
