= NABI CompoBus =

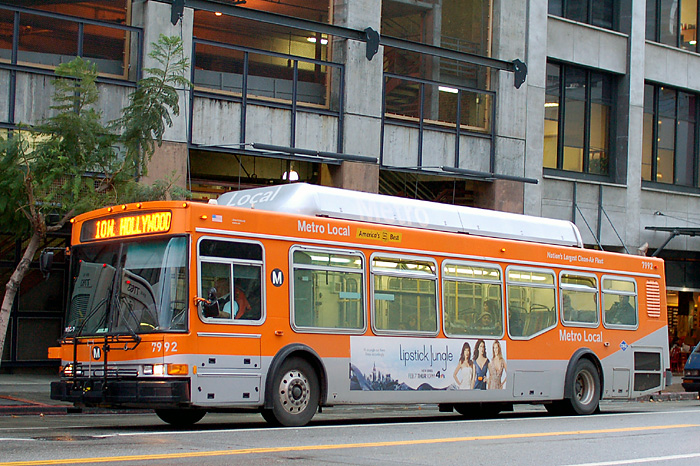
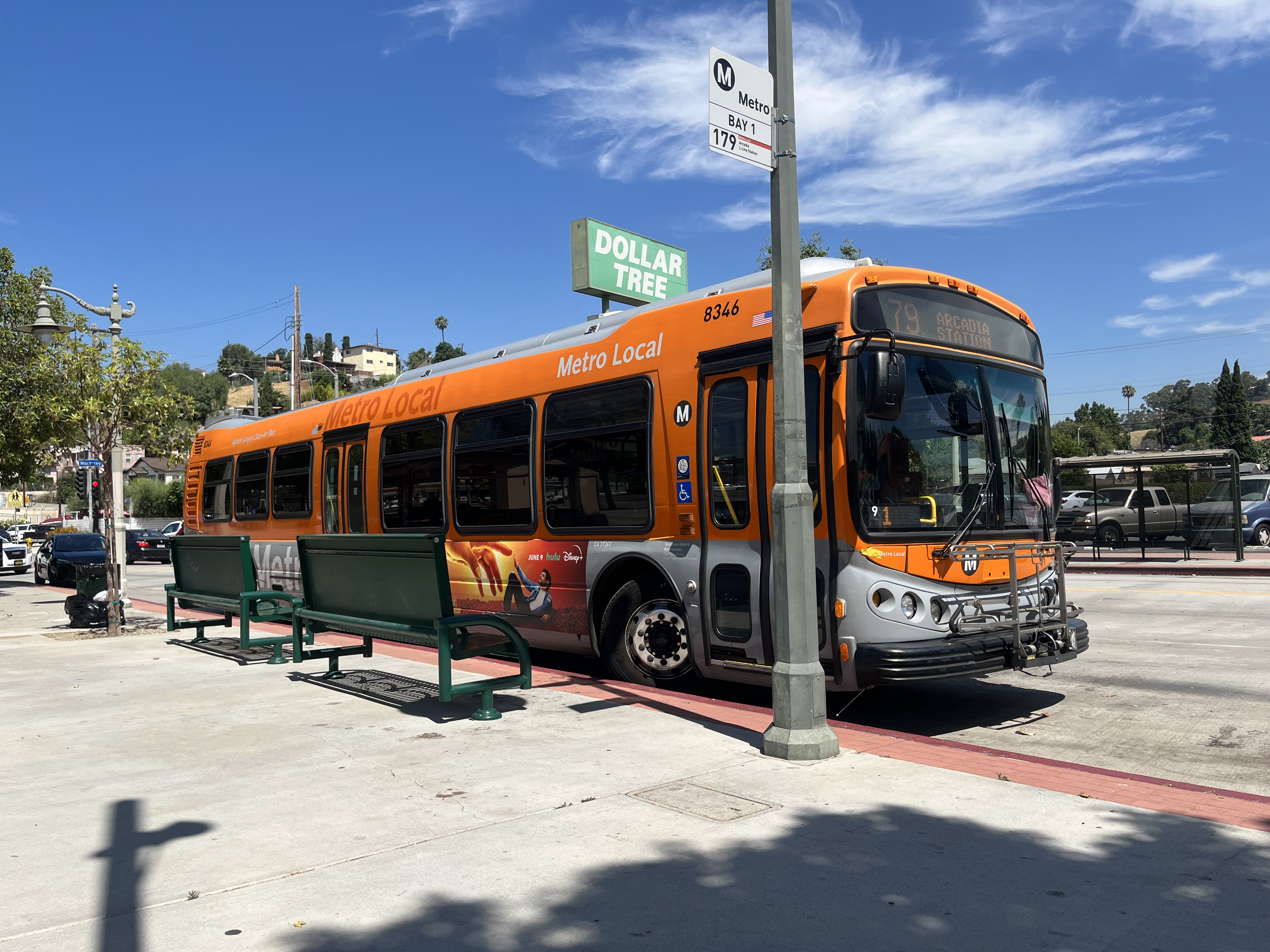
- Top: NABI 40C-LFW (2008); Bottom: NABI Metro 45C (45C-LFW) (2023)

Overview
- Manufacturer: NABI
- Also called: 40C-LFW; Metro 45C (45C-LFW)
- Production: 2004–2013

Body and chassis
- Class: Transit bus
- Body style: Composite unibody
- Layout: RR

Powertrain
- Engine: Cummins; Detroit Diesel
- Transmission: Allison; ZF

Dimensions
- Wheelbase: 275 in (6.99 m) (40C); 332 in (8.43 m) (45C)
- Length: over bumpers: 40 ft 9 in (12.4 m) (40C); 45 ft 7 in (13.9 m) (45C)
- Width: 102 in (2.59 m)
- Height: 116 in (2.95 m) (40C); 126 in (3.20 m) (45C)
- Curb weight: 24,950 lb (11,300 kg) (40C); 30,130 lb (13,700 kg) (45C)

Chronology
- Predecessor: NABI LFW

The NABI CompoBus is a line of low-floor composite-bodied transit buses available in 40' and 45' rigid lengths manufactured by North American Bus Industries (NABI) between 2002 and 2013. In addition to the different available lengths, the buses were sold with a variety of prime movers, ranging from conventional diesel and LNG/CNG combustion engines to diesel-electric hybrid.

The CompoBus complemented the existing LFW line and the 40-foot models were essentially identical in appearance; the larger 45-foot Metro 45C carried distinctive styling. Because the bus body was assembled in Hungary using a licensed process, the CompoBus initially required a waiver from the FTA to exempt it from Buy America requirements. The CompoBus line was discontinued in 2013; the primary users were the transit agencies serving Los Angeles, California, and Phoenix, Arizona.

== History ==
=== Models ===
The NABI CompoBus line uses a model number using the nominal length with a "C" suffix, denoting the composite body, along with the LFW low-floor designator. Each bus has a stamped nameplate with the model number in the format 4xC.nn, denoting the length (40C or 45C) and sequential order number, starting from nn=01.

The first CompoBus to debut was the 40-foot (nominal length) 40C-LFW, unveiled at the City Transport Exhibit 99 in Toronto, Ontario, on May 25, 1999. A prototype of the 45-foot 45C-LFW, later also known as the Metro 45C, was shown at the International Public Transportation Expo on September 25, 2002 and at NABI's final assembly plant in Anniston, Alabama, on December 1, 2003. The 30-foot 30C-LF was only developed to a prototype stage featuring series hybrid propulsion, but never produced.

While the 40C-LFW CompoBus resembles the contemporary first-generation NABI 40-LFW, the Metro 45C had a more distinctive design which the Los Angeles County Metropolitan Transportation Authority (LACMTA) called "very appealing to the riding public." The initial order of 45C buses was intended to serve on bus rapid transit lines in Phoenix, Arizona.

=== Development ===
A composite-bodied transit bus was designed and prototyped in the 1990s under the Advanced Technology Transit Bus (ATTB) project by Northrop Grumman, jointly sponsored by the United States Department of Transportation, Federal Transit Administration's Office of Research, Demonstration, and Innovation and the LACMTA. The 40-foot ATTB prototypes provided up to 7,000 lb (3,200 kg) savings in curb weight compared to conventional transit buses, and also included a series hybrid powertrain, powered by a Detroit Diesel Series 30 CNG engine; each rear wheel was powered by an in-wheel motor.

When the CompoBus was announced in 1998, NABI hailed it as "the commercial heir to the ATTB" and announced plans to develop three composite-bodied transit bus products: 30-foot, 40-foot, and 45-foot. The Metro 45C weighed less than a conventional 40-foot metal-framed transit bus, but offered greater passenger capacity. Because of the CompoBus's corrosion resistance, the estimated service life was increased to 18 years (vice 12).

=== Design ===
Unlike traditional metal-bodied transit buses, which use a steel frame clad with metal skin panels, the structural members, skin, roof, and floor of the CompoBus are built from fiberglass composite laid over a balsa wood core. In total, the structure of the CompoBus uses 80–90 separate components, with just two (the upper and lower main tub sections) responsible for 80% of the entire bus. Metal plates are molded into the structure during assembly to provide mounting points for the engine, transmission, and suspension. The CompoBus is designed to be more resistant to corrosion and low-speed impacts, but are typically not repairable in typical transit operator maintenance facilities if the composite structure is damaged. NABI proposed that repairs would be performed by cutting away the damaged section and discarding it; NABI would then fabricate a replacement section, which could then be integrated into the structure through hand-layup processes.

NABI licensed the composite molding process from TPI Composites in Warren, Rhode Island. The license agreement included access to the patented process, (Note: This process is known as the Seemann Composites Resin Infusion Molding Process (SCRIMP®), named for its inventor, who received ten patents for the process between 1990 and 2000.) shell prototypes, and development of tooling to produce transit buses. The same process had been used to fabricate the bodies for ATTB, and TPI would go on to produce similar composite bus bodies for the 42-foot battery-electric bus sold by Proterra, Inc.

=== Assembly ===
CompoBus body shells were assembled in Hungary and shipped to Alabama for finishing. Although TPI had been announced as the supplier for the composite bodies in 1998, NABI built a factory in Kaposvár, Hungary expressly to fabricate composite buses; a lawsuit between TPI and NABI was settled amicably in 2001. The Kaposvár factory had two sets of molds (one for the 45C and the other switchable between the 40C or 45C), limiting output to four buses per week, as each of the tub sections occupied a mold for three days at a time.

Because the main structures were assembled in Hungary, NABI applied for a 10-year waiver for Buy America requirements in 2002, stating the goals of the ATTB project could be met, including improved ridership. A two-year waiver was issued instead, and an extension request was denied in 2004. However, the realized weight savings for a 40-foot CompoBus were only 2,000 lb (910 kg) because of customer requirements and commonality with existing parts; the more intensive labor process coupled with the rising value of the Euro meant that NABI was forced to raise the price, which became non-competitive with conventional metal-framed buses.

The limited throughput and near-complete assembly at Kaposvár (Note: Compared to conventional NABI buses, which had more than 60% of the components (by cost) added in Anniston, the only components to be fitted to a CompoBus in America were the powertrain and seats. For example, the wiring harness was assembled in America, shipped to Kaposvár for integration into the chassis, then the bus was shipped back to Anniston for final assembly.) also meant the cost of a CompoBus was up to 30% more than the original quote. With the loss of the Buy America waiver, transit agencies could not take advantage of federal subsidies for CompoBus purchases. The first set of CompoBuses were delivered from 2004 to 2006, and the Kaposvár factory was idled for lack of demand after that. The factory was restarted in 2008 after LACMTA placed a significant order, but it proved to be the last and production was stopped again in 2013; the factory and its workforce was acquired by METYX Composites in November 2013.

=== Alternative fuel ===
In 2003, NABI announced it would deliver three 45C CompoBuses to two southern California agencies for conversion to alternative power. One bus would be sent to the SunLine Transit Agency, who had contracted ISE Research to install a hydrogen fuel cell. Two buses would be sent to the South Coast Air Quality Management District to be fitted with a CNG-powered hybrid electric powertrain. However, the bus that was eventually used by SunLine to demonstrate fuel cell power was a New Flyer HE40LF instead.

== Deployment ==
The first CompoBus orders were placed in November 1999 by Big Blue Bus (40C-LFW) and Valley Metro (45C-LFW), the transit agencies serving Santa Monica, California, and Phoenix, Arizona, respectively. 100 CompoBus models had been delivered five years later, by November 2004. Nearly the entire production of 900 CompoBuses were sold to just two agencies: LACMTA (662) and Valley Metro (approximately 200).

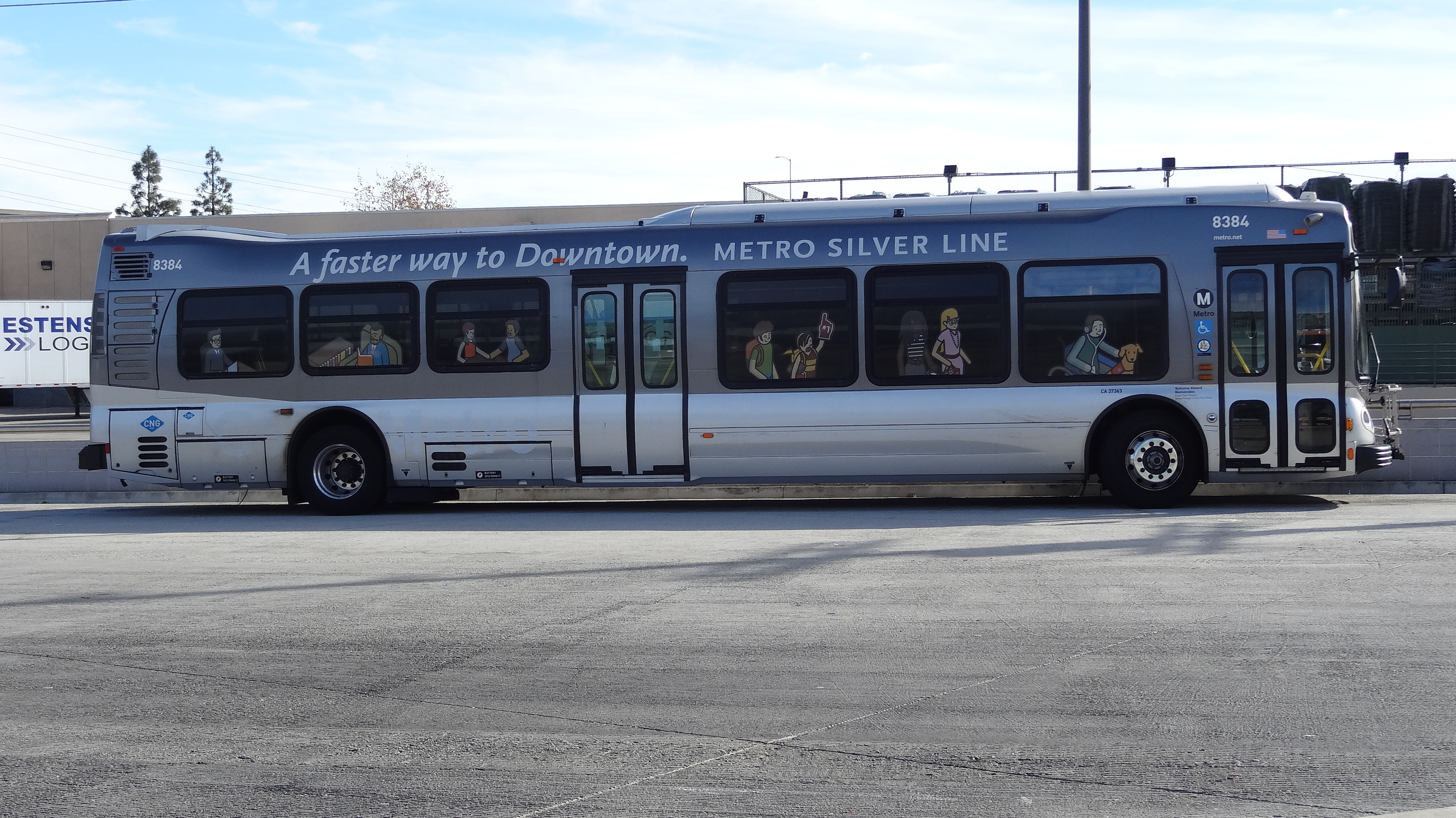
Curbside profile of LACMTA Metro 45C #8384 in J (Silver) Line service (2013)

The majority of CompoBuses produced were the 45-foot 45C models; the primary advantage of the 45C was to offer the maximum capacity in a low-floor, two-axle transit bus while maintaining approximately the same weight (and drivetrain) as a conventional 40-foot bus.

=== Los Angeles Metro ===
The first 40C-LFWs to be delivered to LACMTA were a conversion of twenty units from an existing order of NABI 40-LFWs. The 40C buses, which each cost US$310,000 (equivalent to $543,000 in 2025), entered revenue service in February 2003.

After the procurement of the 40-foot CompoBus pilot fleet, LACMTA began procurement of 100 additional 45-foot Metro 45C buses to expand service at a cost of US$373,156 (equivalent to $653,000 in 2025) each; the Metro 45C offered 20% greater passenger capacity compared to a 40-foot conventional transit bus.

LACMTA worked with NABI to design the 45C and 60-BRT; Roger Snoble, the CEO of LACMTA, pointed to the existing bus fleet and declared "See those boxes down there [in the bus yard]? Don't bring me another bus that looks like that. No more shoeboxes!" The seat fabric for LACMTA's fleet of 45C and 60-BRT buses was designed by Beep'Inc., a collaboration of artist Pae White and architect Tom Marble.

By 2005, with the 20 40C CompoBuses having driven an aggregate 1,300,000 miles (2,100,000 km), 8 of the 40C buses had to be taken out of service to repair cracks in the front suspension; the 86 45C CompoBuses then in service had driven 2,100,000 miles (3,400,000 km) without any similar cracks, and the first accident involving a composite bus was repaired at a significantly lower cost than a conventional metal-framed bus.

Given the successful experience with the CompoBuses in service, LACMTA placed an order for 260 more Metro 45C buses in 2008 to replace conventional metal-framed 40-foot buses and added 41 to the 45C order in 2009. By 2011, the price of a 45C CompoBus had risen to US$610,409 (equivalent to $874,000 in 2025), when LACMTA exercised an option to purchase 100 more, although an additional 50 were purchased later at a significant discount.

=== Valley Metro ===
The Valley Metro 45C CompoBuses were used exclusively on that service's RAPID BRT routes. Reportedly, when NABI 40-LFW buses were substituted on that service, riders would file written complaints with the city. Ridership, as measured by cars parked in park-and-ride lots, rose from an average of 60 vehicles per day between July 2003 and January 2004, to 468 in February 2005, shortly after the 45C CompoBus was implemented on all RAPID routes.

== Competition ==
- Gillig Low Floor
- Neoplan AN440L
- New Flyer Low Floor
- Nova Bus LF Series
- Orion VI
