= NABI BRT =

NABI 60-BRT / NABI 42-BRT
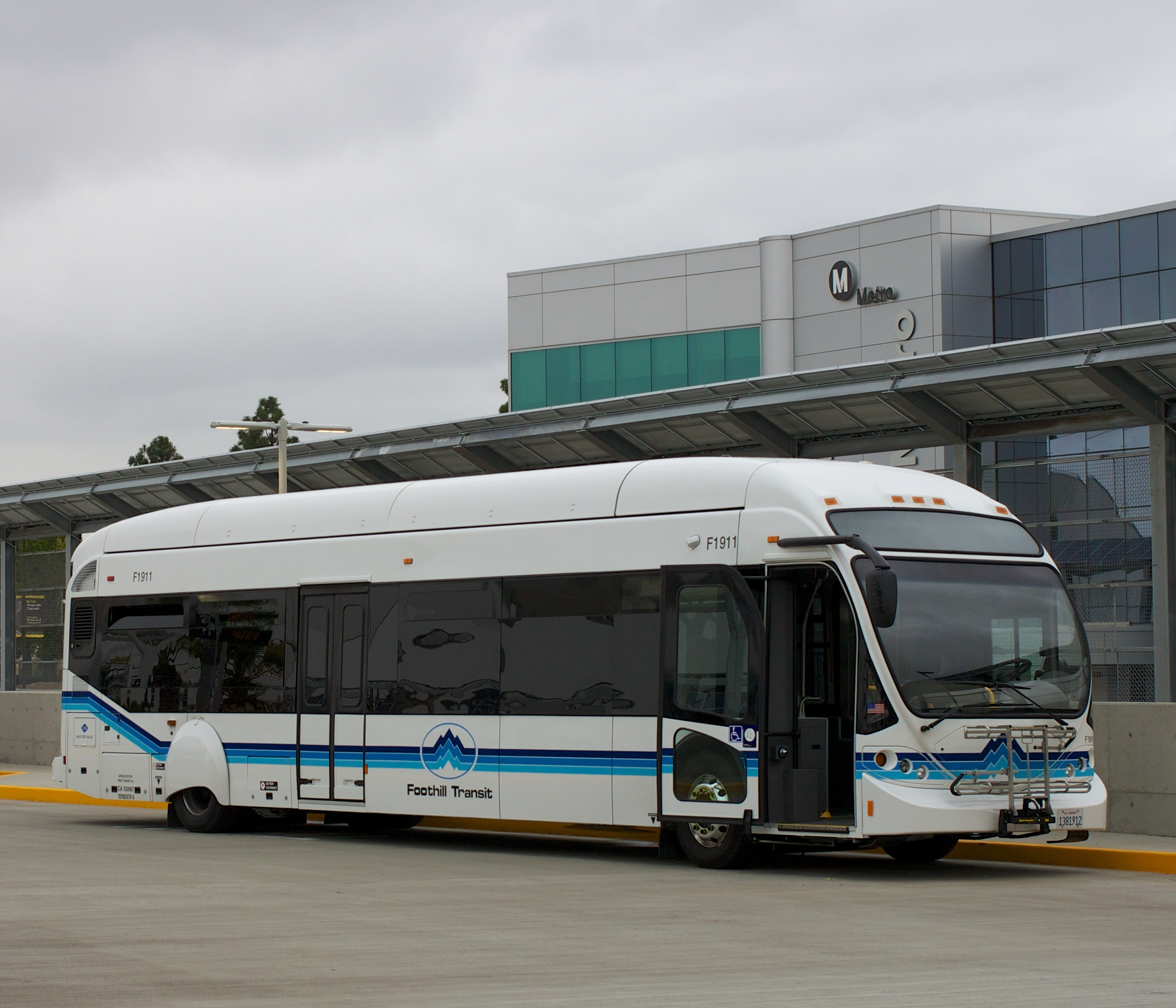
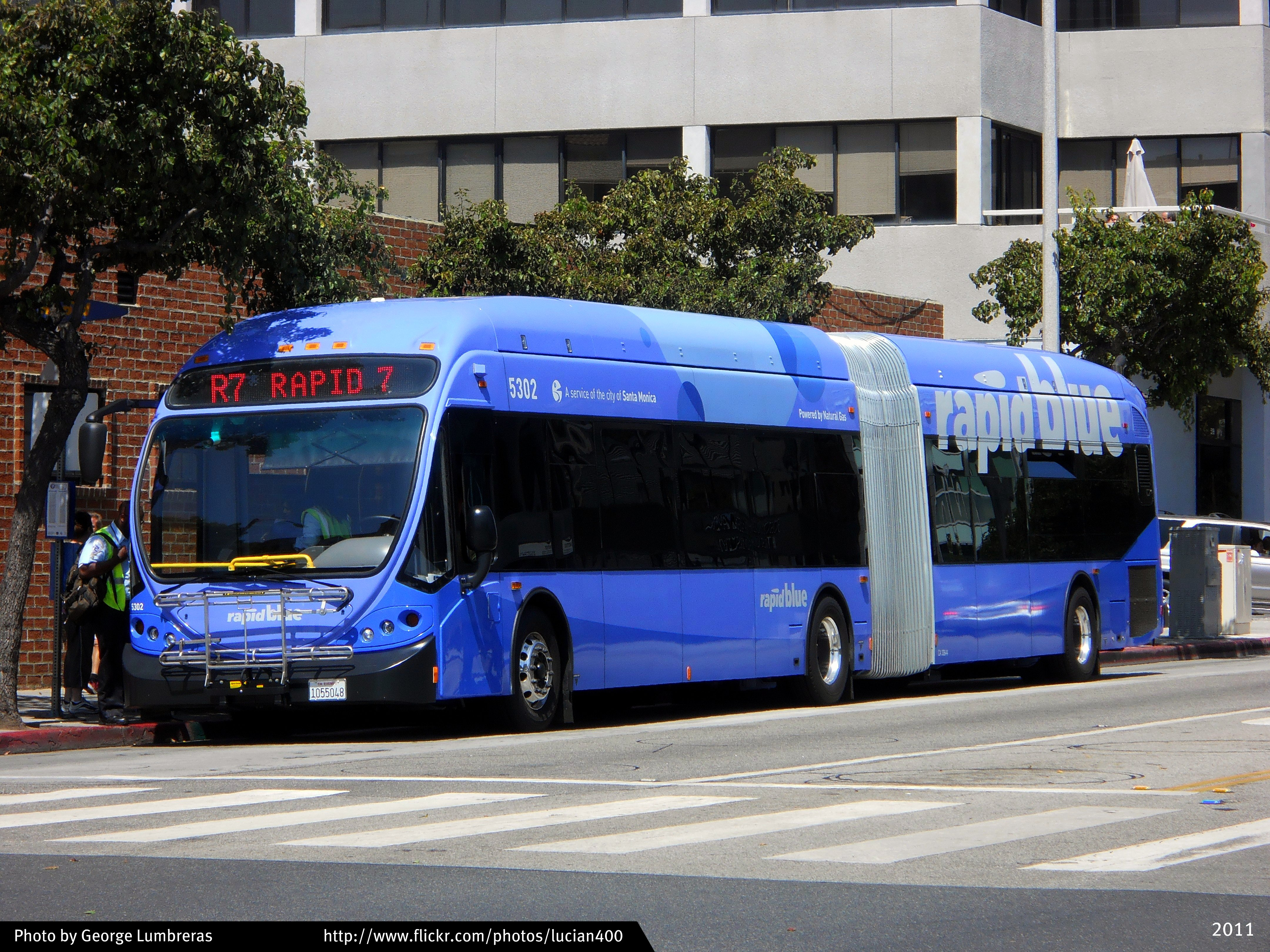
- Top: NABI 42-BRT (2012); Bottom: NABI 60-BRT (2011)

Overview
- Manufacturer: NABI
- Also called: Metro Liner
- Production: 2004–15 (60-BRT); 2006–15 (42-BRT)

Body and chassis
- Class: Transit bus
- Body style: Monocoque
- Layout: RR

Powertrain
- Engine: Cummins
- Transmission: Allison; ZF

Dimensions
- Wheelbase: 308 in (7.82 m) (42'); F:239 in (6.07 m) / R:279 in (7.09 m) (60')
- Length: over bumpers: 43 ft 3 in (13.2 m) (42'); 60 ft 9 in (18.5 m) (60')
- Width: 102 in (2.59 m)
- Height: 133 in (3.38 m)
- Curb weight: 30,450 lb (13,800 kg) (42'); 45,870 lb (20,800 kg) (60')

Chronology
- Predecessor: NABI LFW; NABI CompoBus
- Successor: New Flyer Xcelsior

The NABI BRT series is a line of low-floor transit buses that was produced by North American Bus Industries (NABI) between 2004 and 2015. It was built in two variants - the 42' rigid 42-BRT and the 60' articulated 60-BRT (Note: The BRT series also included the 65' articulated 65-BRT, of which only one prototype was sold, and the concept 37' rigid 37-BRT, which was never actually produced.) - and offered with conventional diesel, diesel-electric hybrid, compressed natural gas, and liquefied natural gas powertrains.

The NABI BRT was styled to resemble a light-rail vehicle for service on bus rapid transit lines, joining the existing NABI LFW and NABI CompoBus product lines. After New Flyer acquired NABI in 2013, all NABI product lines were discontinued in 2015, once existing orders for NABI buses had been fulfilled.

== Design ==
LACMTA #9208 (60-BRT) in G Line (Orange) service (2013)

The NABI 60-BRT was designed in response to a Los Angeles County Metropolitan Transportation Authority (LACMTA) request for proposal for the rolling stock on its forthcoming Orange Line (now G Line), which specified a vehicle that was "sleek, streamlined, and aerodynamic", carried three extra-wide doors to facilitate faster boarding, and were less noisy (78 dBA) than typical transit buses.

The NABI 60-BRT bus NABI designed for the contract was announced in 2003, and production started in 2004. A pilot vehicle was delivered in fall 2004 for a two-month trial, and the first 28 60-BRTs (which MTA called 'Metro Liners') were delivered in June 2005.

NABI's initial as-bid price was US$633,000 (equivalent to $1,079,000 in 2025). To meet regional air quality requirements, the buses were equipped with Cummins 320 L-Gas Plus CNG engines, with a fuel storage capacity of 27,088 ft^{3} (767.0 m^{3}) in 12 storage tanks, providing a range of 400 miles (640 km).

The NABI BRT featured a double roof providing a space 18 inches (460 mm) tall, extending the length of the vehicle, which could be used to store HVAC equipment, natural gas tanks (for CNG-fueled vehicles), or batteries (for hybrid vehicles). Like prior NABI buses, body shells were assembled in Hungary and shipped to the NABI plant in Anniston, Alabama for finishing until body production was shifted to Anniston gradually starting in 2011; by late 2012, the transition was complete.

NABI introduced by a similarly styled 42-foot rigid bus in 2006. LACMTA was the first customer for this model, as well, followed by LA World Airport's "FlyAway" service and Foothill Transit over the following year.

A single 65-foot model (65-BRT) was built and sold to LACMTA, numbered 9495. The extended 65-BRT (nicknamed 'Longfellow') was introduced to service in September 2007 and required a special permit from CalTrans; to keep its weight similar to the 60-BRT, it only carries 8 CNG tanks as opposed to the 60-BRT's 12.

On the stamped vehicle identification plate, the vehicle type is identified as xxBRT.nn, where xx gives the nominal length (in feet) and nn is the sequentially-assigned order number, starting from 01.

=== Hybrid ===
Six model 42-BRT buses delivered to LACMTA in 2008 used a unique "Thundervolt" gasoline-electric hybrid powertrain from ISE Corporation. The system proved to be unreliable and after ISE went bankrupt in 2010, LACMTA was unable to get support for the system. Plans were considered to repower the buses. The buses were never repowered and eventually just sat in the Long Beach yard.

The largest user of hybrid NABI BRT buses was WMATA, who placed an order in July 2013 for 105 diesel-electric hybrid 42-BRT buses. These buses used a more reliable combination of a Cummins ISL9 engine mated with the Allison Transmission H 40 hybrid system which is coupled to the engine in lieu of a conventional transmission.

== Deployment ==
The first NABI 60-BRT buses were delivered to LACMTA in October 2004; LACMTA was also the first customer for the 42-BRT, delivered in 2008. The final NABI BRT buses to be built were completed in 2015: the 60-BRT for Transfort, serving Fort Collins, Colorado and the 42-BRT for Massport, serving Logan Airport in Boston. The NABI factory in Anniston was then retooled to produce New Flyer Xcelsior low-floor buses for the United States transit market.

Most of the BRT production was for the 60-BRT model. LACMTA was the largest customer, with almost 400 60-BRTs delivered. The seat fabric for LACMTA's fleet of Metro 45C CompoBus and 60-BRT Metro Liners was designed by Beep'Inc., a collaboration of artist Pae White and architect Tom Marble.

== See also ==
- NABI LFW

Competing models:

- Gillig Low Floor
- New Flyer Low Floor
- New Flyer Xcelsior
- Nova Bus LFS
- Orion VII
