= SamTrans fleet =

San Mateo County Transit District bus fleet

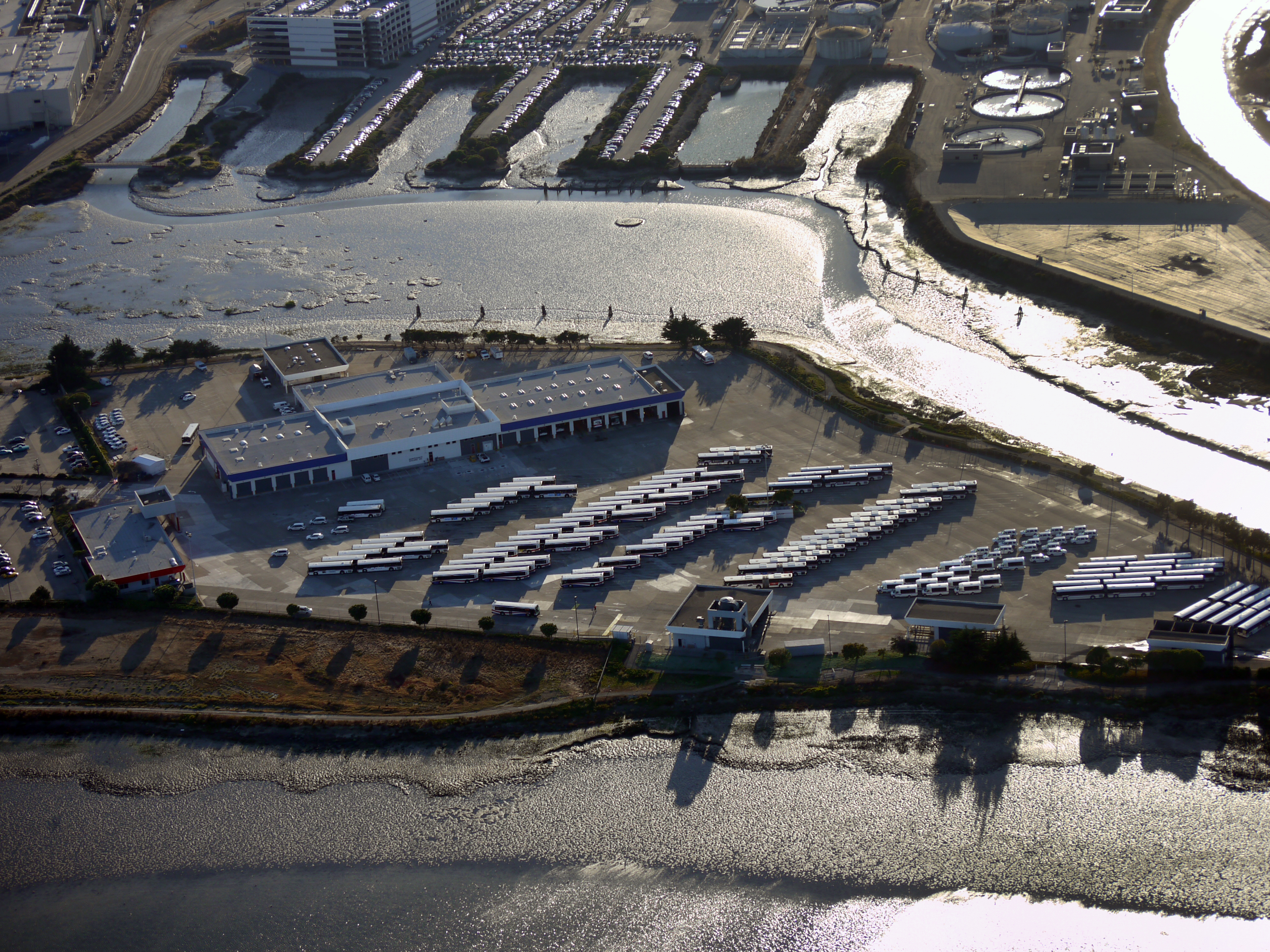
samTrans North Base, the primary maintenance and storage facility for the bus fleet near San Francisco International Airport (2010)

The San Mateo County Transit District (SamTrans) fleet of buses has operated throughout San Mateo County since 1976, after county voters approved the formation of samTrans in 1974 to merge 11 predecessor municipal bus systems.

== Summary ==
samTrans Facilities
- Maintenance and storage
- Administrative
- Contract operator
1 North Base
2 samTrans Headquarters
3 South Base
4 Brewster Depot
5 Half Moon Bay (MV Transportation)

As of March 2018, SamTrans operates a total of 379 vehicles in revenue service. SamTrans has two maintenance facilities for its fixed-route bus fleet. SamTrans headquarters are in San Carlos, California, one block southwest from the San Carlos Caltrain station. In addition, two facilities are used by its paratransit operator, MV Transportation: one at Brewster Depot in Redwood City, and another facility in Half Moon Bay.

== Livery ==
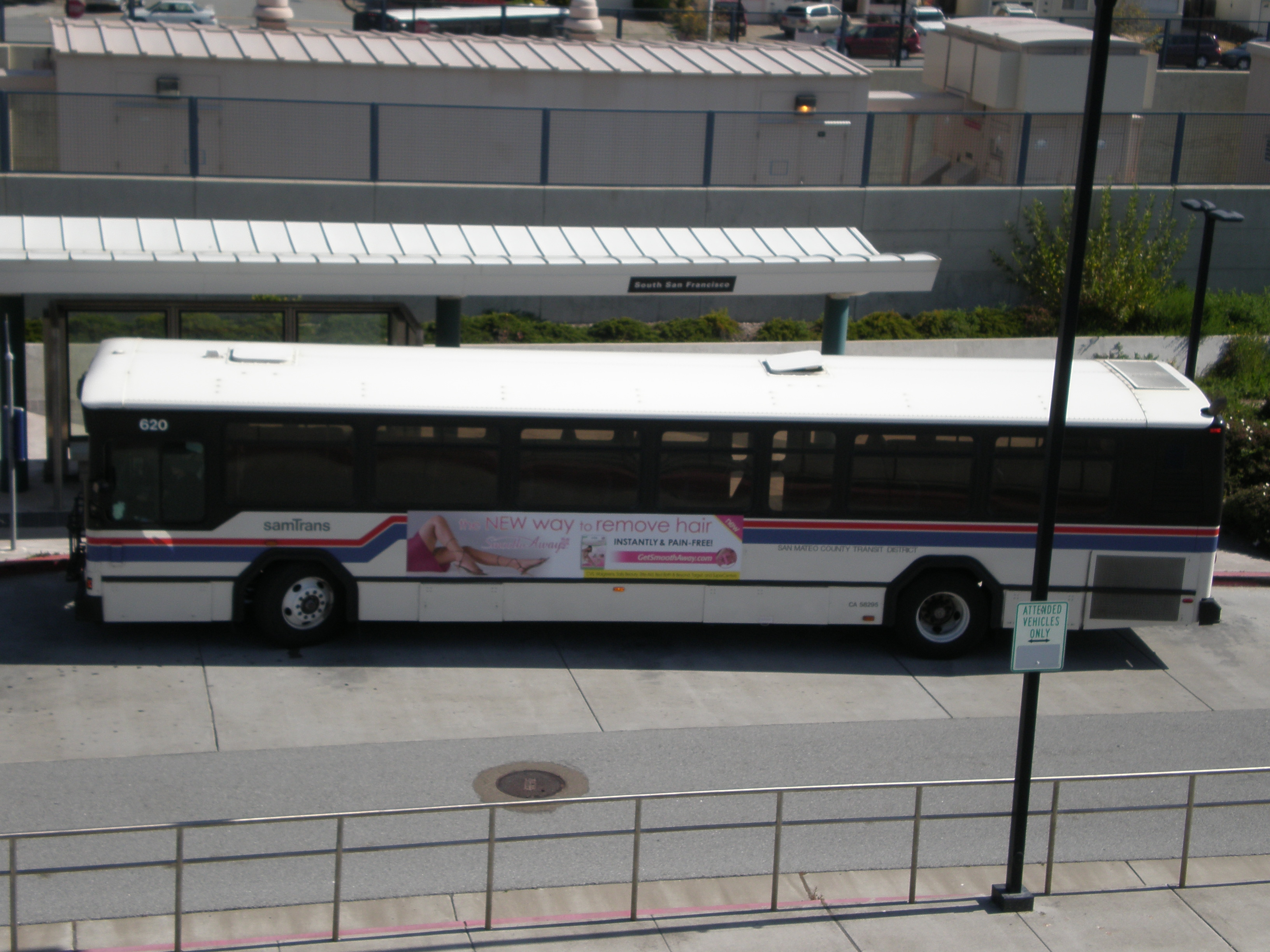
Gillig Phantom with "linear patriot" livery

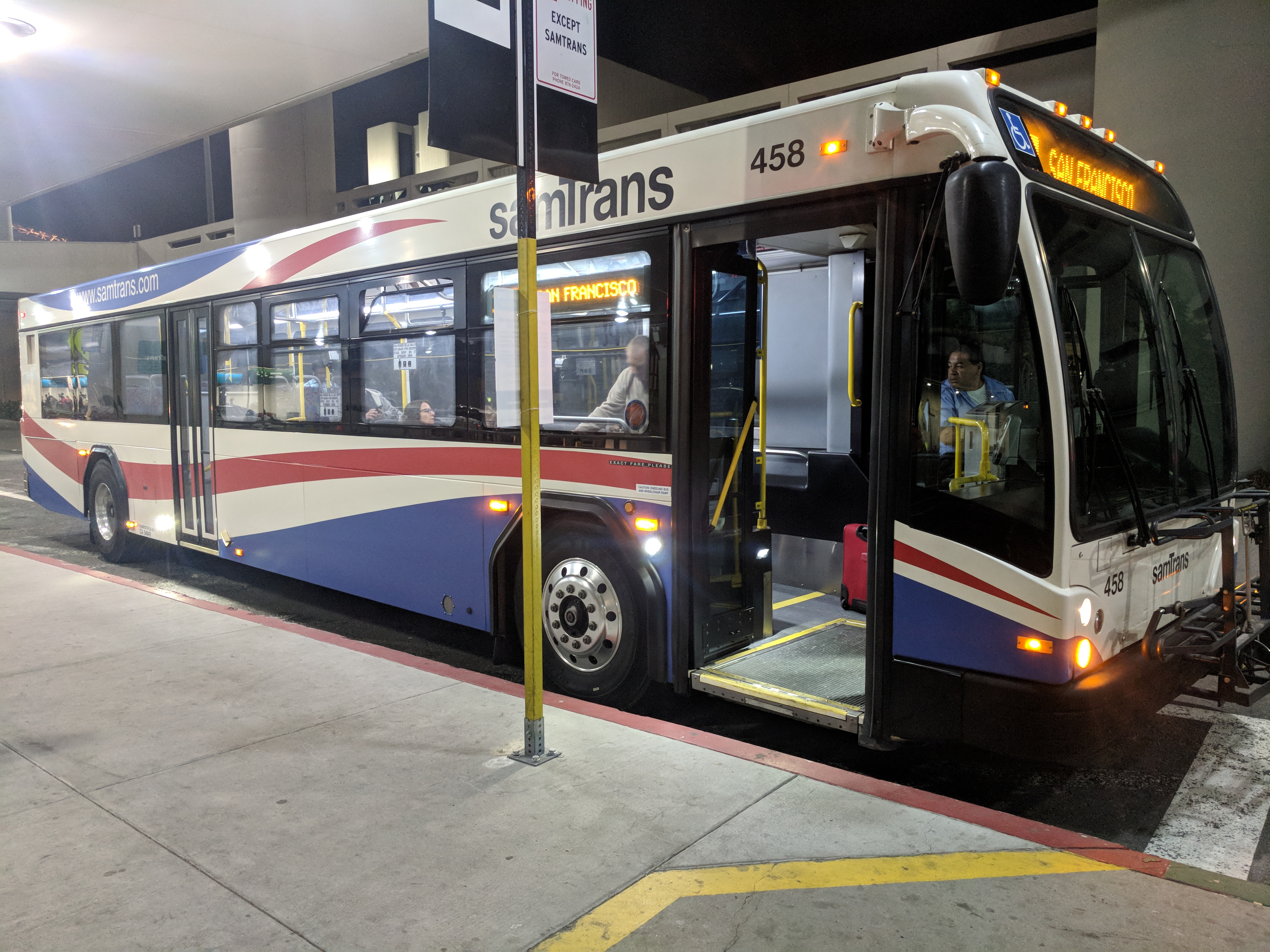
Gillig BRT with "curvy patriot" livery

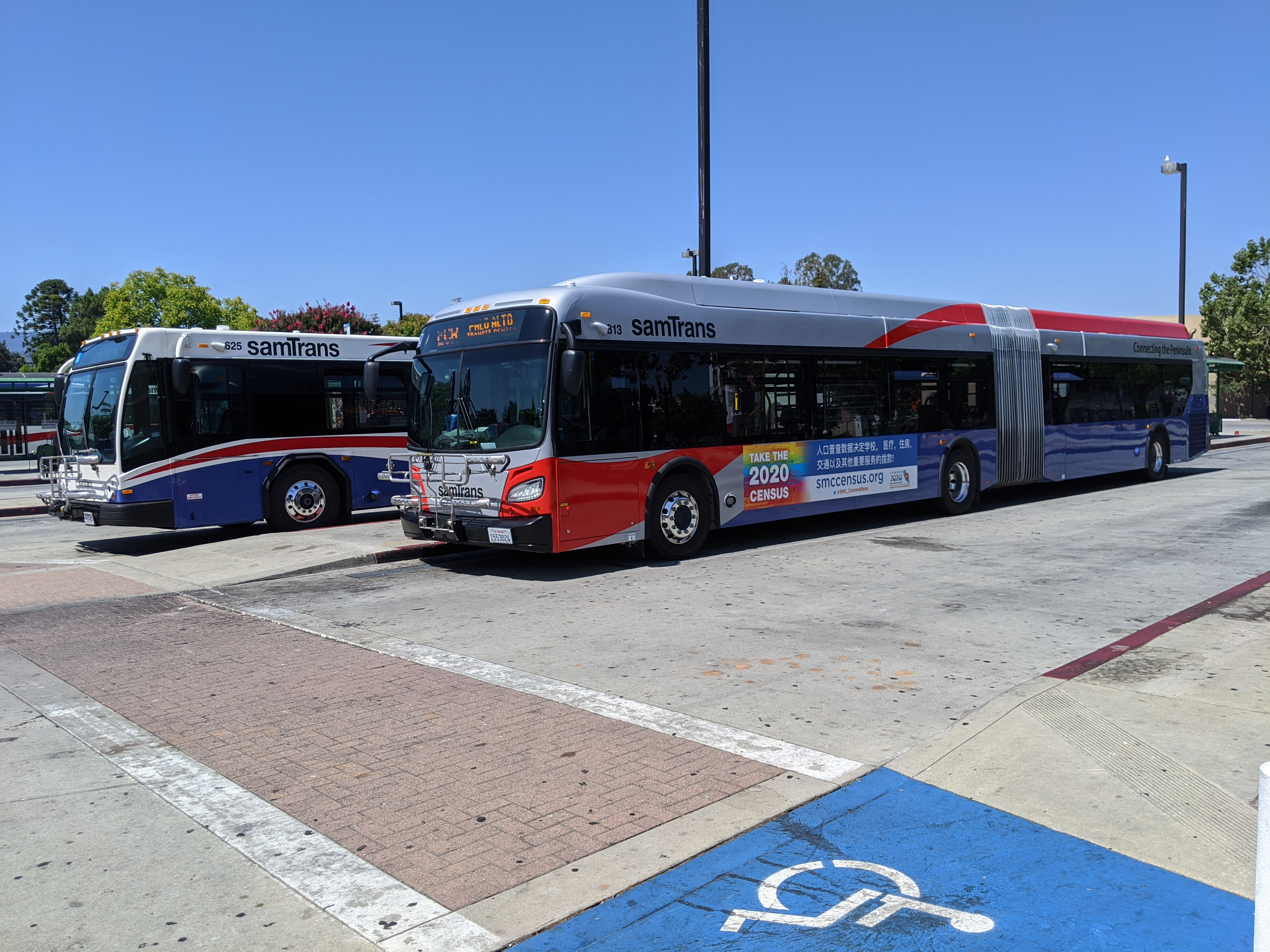
Gillig BRT (background) with "curvy patriot" livery and New Flyer Xcelsior XD60 with "silver" livery

The samTrans livery is predominantly white with red and blue stripes. Early buses featured linear horizontal stripes, and starting with the 2009 Gillig BRTs, the stripes are curved along the sides. A new variant of the livery was introduced later; the base color is silver, instead of white, and the blue stripe extends from below the front door to the beltline at the rear, with a red stripe starting from the headlight and flowing up to the roof.

== Fixed-route fleet ==
Under the California Air Resources Board Innovative Clean Transit regulation adopted in December 2018, public transit agencies in California will gradually transition to a zero-emission bus fleet by 2040. SamTrans has set a goal of transitioning to an all-electric fleet by 2032. SamTrans considers fixed-route vehicles to have a service lifetime of 12 years.

=== Current ===
Mfr & Model	Type	Fleet numbers	Year built	Qty	Image	Notes
Gillig BRT	40-ft	400-490	2009	91		446-490 are assigned to contract runs, operated by MV Transportation.; Standard rear styling
Gillig BRT	40-ft	600-649	2017	50		Standard rear styling
Gillig BRT	40-ft Hybrid	700-724	2013	25		Standard rear styling
Gillig BRT	40-ft	900-920	2014	21		Standard rear styling
Gillig BRT	35-ft	500-539	2010	40		535-539 are assigned to contract runs, operated by MV Transportation
Gillig Low Floor	29-ft	2910-2913	2013	4		No rear door
Gillig Low Floor	29-ft	2950-2961	2014	12		No rear door
New Flyer XD60	60-ft artic.	800-854	2019	55		Intended to be the last purchase of diesel buses. Pilot bus 800 delivered April 2019.; Full-roof spec

=== On order ===
Mfr & Model	Type	Fleet numbers	Year built	Qty	Image	Notes
New Flyer XE40 (NG)	40-ft	1000+	2022	Currently has 16, more to come		Currently mainly running on routes 120 & 130. Also running on several other routes, like the ECR, 112, 121, or EPX
New Flyer XHE40	40-ft	3000+	2023	10		Currently mainly running on routes 120 & 130. Also running on several other routes, like the ECR, 112, 121, or EPX
Gillig BRT+ (battery-electric)	40-ft	5000+	2023?	20		Some in service as of January 2026.

=== Retired ===
Mfr & Model	Type	Fleet Numbers	Year Built	Qty	Preserved Unit(s)	Last Retired	Image	Notes
General Motors Old Look	35-ft	200-213; 215-218	1947	18				TDH-4507 models acquired from various transit operators in 1976.
General Motors Old Look	37' 9"	214, 219		2				TDH-4801 models acquired from various transit operators in 1976.
General Motors Old Look	30-ft	242		1				TDH-3501 model acquired from Northgate Transit in 1976.
General Motors Old Look	28-ft	243		1				TGH-3102 model acquired from Northgate Transit in 1976.
General Motors New Look	35-ft	100-137; 175-187	1960-67	51		1985		TDH-4517, -4518, and -4519; T6H-4523N models acquired from various transit operators in 1976; replaced in 1985.
General Motors New Look	40-ft	151-167; 9801-9849	1960-63	17		1985		TDH-5301 and -5303; TDM-5303 models acquired from various transit operators in 1976; replaced in 1985.
Flxible New Look	40-ft	150	1963	1		1983		Acquired from Seattle Metro (ex-778).
AM General Metropolitan	35-ft coach	400-443	1977	44	EQ1 (439), (Note: Sold at auction in 2015.) EQ2 (440)	1990		"Earthquake buses" EQ1 and EQ2 were retained in the contingency fleet, replaced by 2017.
AM General Metropolitan	40-ft coach	500-529	1977	30		1990		"Earthquake buses" EQ1 and EQ2 were retained in the contingency fleet, replaced by 2017.
Crown-Ikarus 286	60-ft articulated	700–709	1980	10		1992?		Placed in reserve fleet by 1985.
Flyer D900	35-ft coach	300-359	1980	60		1994		Some were transferred to Muni to serve in the reserve fleet. They retained the samTrans fleet number with an "R" appended.
Flyer D900	40-ft coach	600-652	1980	53		1994		Some were transferred to Muni to serve in the reserve fleet. They retained the samTrans fleet number with an "R" appended.
Gillig Phantom	40-ft coach	400-437	1990	38		2004		
Gillig Phantom	40-ft coach	600-665; 667-672	1998	72	635, (Note: Sold at auction in 2018.) DR1 (651), DR2 (637)	2015		635, 637 (DR2), and 651 (DR1) retained in contingency fleet for marketing & outreach, replacing AM General EQ1/EQ2 (1977) and Gillig 852 (1984).
Gillig Phantom	40-ft coach	800-821	1983	22		1998		
Gillig Phantom	40-ft coach	850-899	1984	50	852 (Note: Sold at auction in 2018.)	2003		852 replaced as marketing/outreach bus by 635.
Gillig Phantom	40-ft coach	900-972	1993	73		2010		Overhauled and life extended to 2008/10.
Gillig Phantom	40-ft coach	9890-9895	1988	6		2006		Initially designated for training service.
Gillig Phantom	35-ft coach	700-763	1993	64		2010		Overhauled and life extended to 2008/10.
Gillig Phantom	40-ft suburban	800-810	2003	11		2008		Ordered without rear doors; originally intended for route REX (Regional EXpress).
Volvo B10M	60-ft articulated	100-114	1985	15		2002-03		Scrapped
Neoplan USA AN460A	60-ft articulated	116-130	1985	15		2002		Assigned to contract runs originally operated by Greyhound Peninsula Lines until 1990, Grosvenor Bus Lines until the early 2000's and finally MV Transportation. They sported "9" in front of their fleet numbers. (9)129 was totaled in an accident in 1995 and was scrapped.[2][3] Retired circa 2002-2003. All units were scrapped.
NFI D60	60-ft articulated	500-539	1990	40		2004		500-529 were originally assigned to contract runs, operated by Grosvenor Bus Lines until the early 2000's and later MV Transportation. They sported "9" in front of their fleet numbers. Most units ranging from 509-529 returned to the district shortly before retirement. Retired in 2003-2004. Equipped with Detroit Diesel Series 92 (6V92) engines.
Gillig Low Floor	40-ft coach	300-359	2003-04	60		2017		300-359 equipped with Detroit Diesel Series 50 engines. Currently used for training duty.
NABI 436 (60-SFW)	60 ft. High-floor Articulated bus	100–154 (0200-0254)	2002	55		2020		Last NABI 436 buses built. First units entered service on 11/4/2002 and the last units entered service in January 2003. 147-154 were operated by MV Transportation for contracted routes. Later 141-146 were assigned to contracted routes. 137-140 were temporarily assigned to contracted runs, but later returned to the district.
Gillig Low Floor	29-ft	2900-2903	2009	4		2022		Currently used for training duty.
Proterra Catalyst	40-ft, E2 battery	725–734	2018-20	10		2020		First battery electric buses for samTrans. Replica #750 exhibited in Oct 2018. 2 of 2 "Lot 1" (400V) buses accepted, then retired due to technical issues; 6 of 8 "Lot 2" (800V) buses delivered, then returned due to door issues. Remainder of order canceled.

== See also ==
- San Francisco Municipal Railway fleet
