= North American Bus Industries =

Defunct American bus manufacturer

North American Bus Industries, Inc.
- Industry: Automotive
- Founded: 1992
- Defunct: 2015
- Fate: Acquired by New Flyer Industries, brand and products retired
- Headquarters: 105 Bus Parkway, Anniston, Alabama, U.S.
- Products: Transit buses
- Parent: Cerberus Capital Management (2006–2013); New Flyer Industries (2013–15)

North American Bus Industries, Inc. (NABI) was a manufacturer of heavy-duty transit buses with its headquarters, bus manufacturing and assembly operations, located in Anniston, Alabama. Its products ranged from 31-feet to 60-feet in length, and were sold to operators throughout the United States and Puerto Rico. NABI's U.S. operations also include an aftermarket parts division in Delaware, Ohio (at the former Flxible factory), and an after-sales service center at Mira Loma, California.

The company was acquired by New Flyer Industries in 2013, which in 2015 discontinued production of NABI's product lines at the Anniston plant.

== History ==
Ikarus Body and Coach Building Works of Budapest, Hungary (Ikarus Hungary) was a very large bus manufacturer having multiple plants in Hungary, with a production output during the 1980s of over 13,000 buses per year. In the 1980s, Ikarus Hungary entered strategic partnerships with U.S. and Canadian assemblers to sell its Ikarus 280 articulated bus to the United States and Canadian transit markets as the Crown-Ikarus 286 (with Crown Coach in Los Angeles) and Orion-Ikarus 286 / Orion III (with Ontario Bus Industries in Mississauga, Ontario), respectively. Under these partnerships, partially finished rolling chassis were shipped from Hungary for local fitment of seats and drivetrains compatible with domestic transit fleets. Both partnerships were dissolved by the late 1980s.

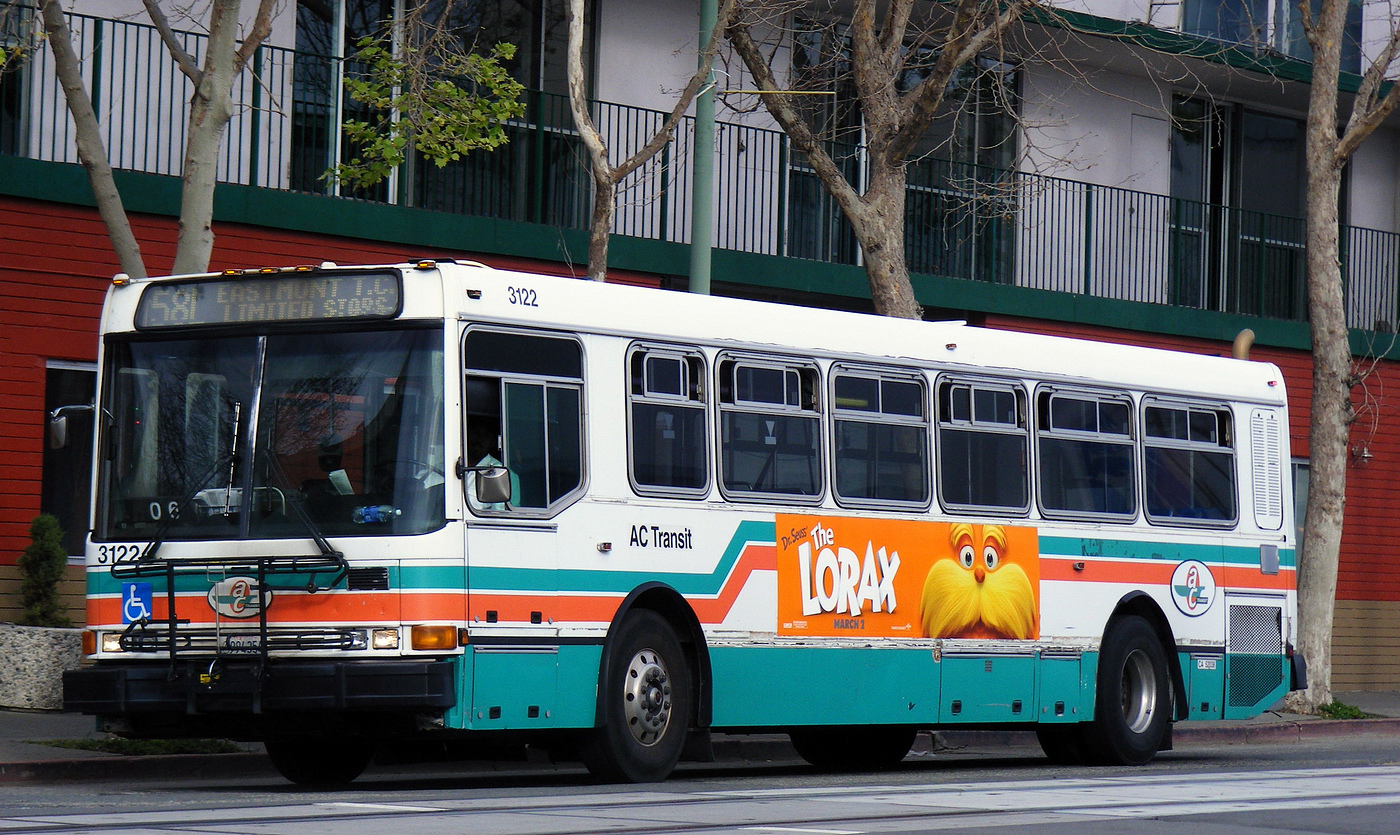
AC Transit 3122, a NABI 416 produced in 1998

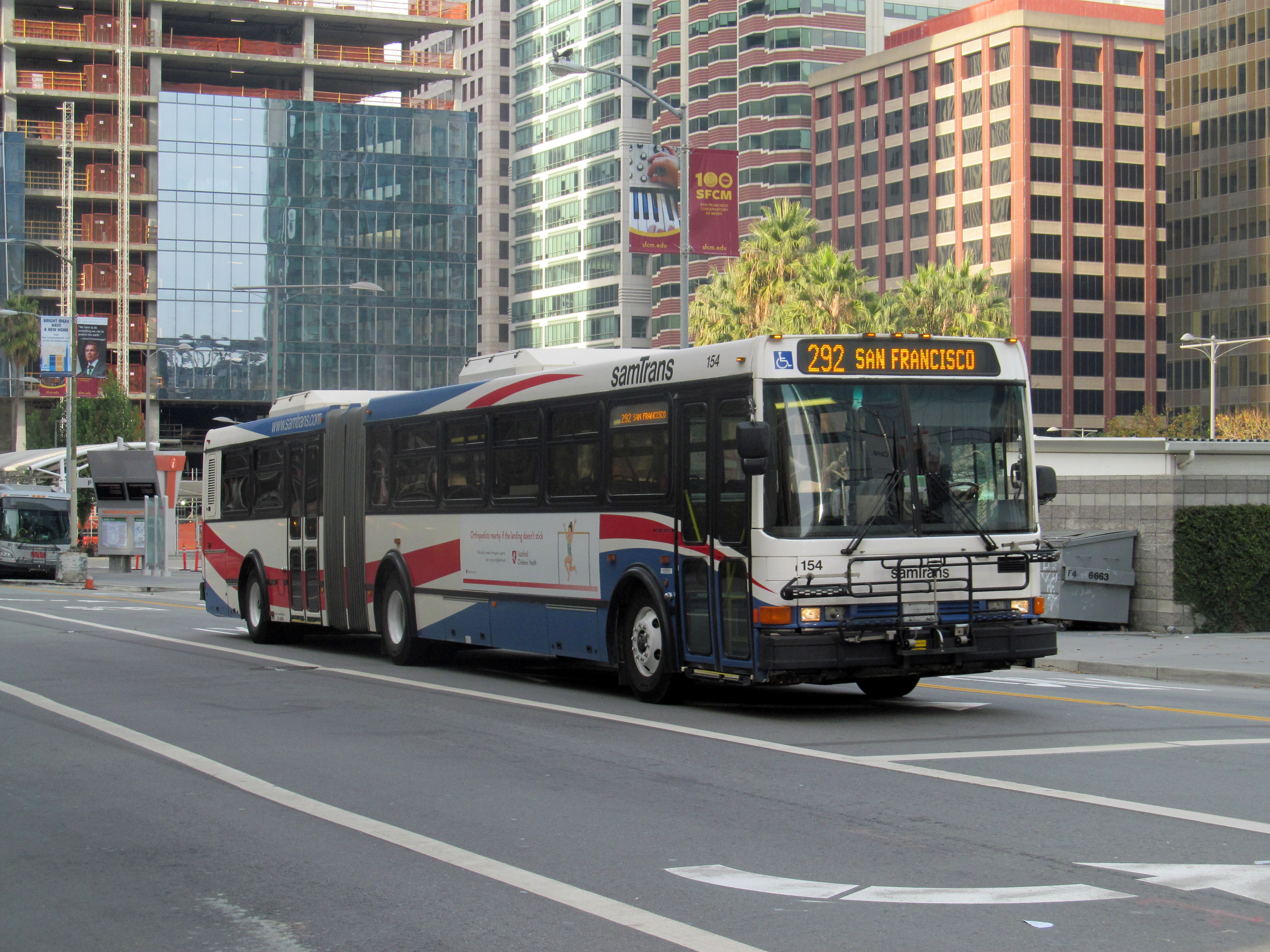
SamTrans 154, the last NABI 436 ever produced

Ikarus Hungary formed another partnership in 1989 with Union City Body Company, Inc. (UCBC) of Union City, Indiana to produce American variants of the Ikarus 415 and Ikarus 435 transit bus for the United States market as the 416 and 436, respectively. The partnership was incorporated as Ikarus USA, Inc. (Ikarus USA), which was responsible for assembling and marketing the buses to the United States market, with operations based in Anniston, Alabama. UCBC declared bankruptcy in 1992.

=== American Ikarus, 1992–1996 ===
The company that is now known as NABI was incorporated in the US, in the state of Alabama, in November 1992, under the name American Ikarus, Inc. (American Ikarus). It was incorporated by the First Hungary Fund Limited, (FHF) a Jersey equity investment fund. Its incorporation was accompanied by FHF's concurrent formation of a Hungarian holding company, North American Bus Industries, Kft. (NABI Hungary) owning the shares of American Ikarus. This arrangement—with American Ikarus as a subsidiary of NABI Hungary--(collectively The Group) resulted in FHF's investment being Hungarian-based—in alignment with FHF's objective of investing in business opportunities resulting from the political and economic changes then taking place in Hungary. American Ikarus simultaneously acquired the assets of Ikarus USA. Such assets included facilities in Alabama, miscellaneous equipment and inventory. Simultaneously with the formation of American Ikarus, the previously established strategic alliance between Ikarus USA and Ikarus Hungary was assigned to the newly incorporated American Ikarus.

At the time of incorporation, it was planned that American Ikarus would purchase unfinished buses from Ikarus Hungary under its strategic alliance, ship them to the U.S. and perform final assembly at its Alabama plant. This arrangement provided certain engineering and manufacturing benefits and allowed compliance with "Buy America" requirements of the Surface Transportation Assistance Act of 1982 which established American content requirements for federally assisted rolling stock procurements, including transit buses. Such vehicles had already been designed by Ikarus Hungary specifically for the U.S. market, with unfinished buses having been produced previously by Ikarus Hungary under the same strategic alliance with Ikarus USA. These vehicles were the Model 416 forty-foot standard-floor transit bus and its larger sibling, the Model 436 sixty-foot articulated transit bus.

The plant in Anniston, AL opened in 1993 under this business arrangement, performing final assembly operations, delivery and after-sales service using unfinished knock-down buses produced in Hungary. Delivery of unfinished buses was accomplished by rail shipment from Budapest to Bremerhaven, then shipment by roll-on/roll-off ocean vessels to Charleston, SC, and then by delivery on flatbed trailers to Anniston, AL.

At the time of incorporation, Ikarus' business was in decline due to political and economic changes following the fall of the Berlin Wall in 1989. Such decline continued after the group's formation, resulting in the shutdown of one of Ikarus plants in Budapest. This plant was purchased from Ikarus Hungary by NABI, Kft. which simultaneously entered a license agreement with Ikarus Hungary allowing NABI, Kft. to produce its own unfinished buses in Budapest, and deliver them to its subsidiary in Alabama for final assembly and delivery to U.S. customers. In 1994, the group began use of this manufacturing arrangement with no further involvement of Ikarus Hungary, other than its role as licensor of the Model 416 and Model 436 standard-floor transit bus designs; the license was dropped in 1996.

=== North American Bus Industries, 1996–2006 ===
In 1996, the company began aggressive expansion of its aftermarket parts department which had previously supplied service parts only for its own products. This expansion was accomplished by hiring individuals previously employed within the aftermarket parts organization of the defunct Flxible Corporation, which had recently discontinued transit bus manufacturing and aftermarket parts operations in Ohio. Once hired, this group leased facilities in Ohio, and began to expand the sale of aftermarket parts to operators of competing makes of buses.

Also in 1996, American Ikarus, Inc. was renamed North American Bus Industries, Inc. due to the dissolution of its affiliation with Ikarus Hungary some years earlier, and because the company was easily and incorrectly confused with the no longer related Ikarus Hungary, which had fallen into further distress due to continued decline of its European markets.

In 1997, NABI Kft. was re-registered in Hungary from a limited liability company to NABI, Rt., a joint stock company, allowing it to raise capital via public offering. Thereafter, in August of that year, the company raised $US 27.1 million in a public offering, with its shares listed on the Budapest Stock Exchange. FHF retained approximately 56% of NABI, Rt. shares, with the remainder of the shares publicly traded.

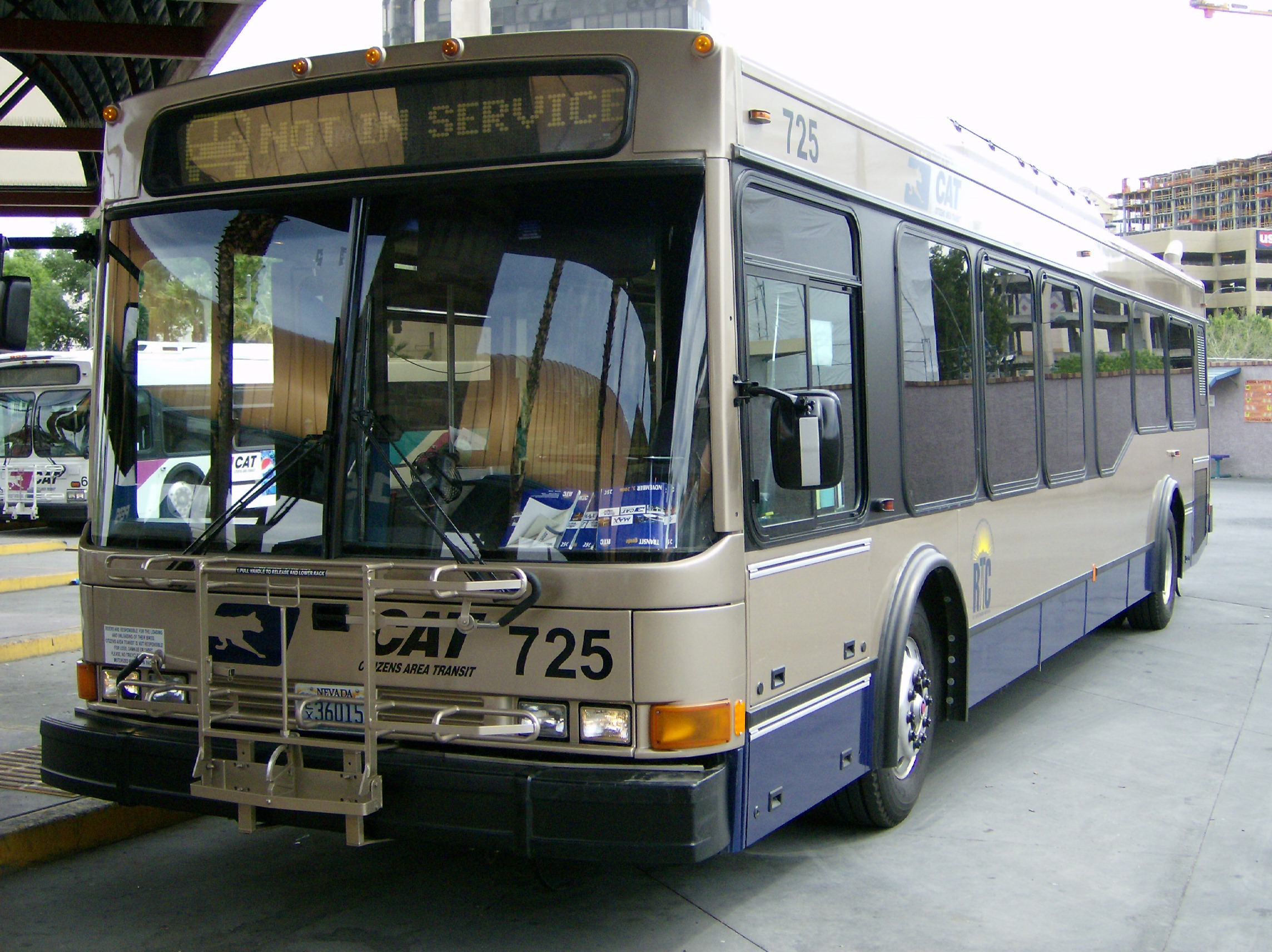
First generation NABI 40-LFW for Citizens Area Transit, serving Las Vegas; note styling is similar to preceding standard-floor 416 and 436

Also in 1997, NABI Hungary was certified as conforming to the ISO 9001 quality and organizational standard, with NABI, Inc. becoming ISO 9001 certified the following year. In 1998, The Group also implemented the use of BaaN, an integrated enterprise resource planning system. Additionally, 1998 marked the first delivery of NABI's new, 40-foot low-floor Model 40-LFW transit bus. (35-foot and 31-foot variants of this product were later derived). NABI announced it had won the first contract for the 40-LFW in January 1997, awarded by the cities of Phoenix and Tempe, both in Arizona.

NABI debuted the CompoBus at the City Transport Exhibit 99 in Toronto, Ontario, on May 25, 1999. The CompoBus used a one-piece composite body made from fiberglass and plastic resin, built for NABI by TPI Composites, Inc. in Warren, Rhode Island. NABI previously had announced its partnership with TPI in 1998, adding that three composite-bodied products would be developed: 30-foot and 40-foot low-floor transit buses, and a 45-foot motor coach. The first CompoBus orders were placed by transit agencies serving Santa Monica, California (40C-LFW) and Phoenix (45C-LFW) in November 1999, and 100 CompoBus models had been delivered five years later, by November 2004.

In 2000, The Group announced its move into the European bus market with NABI, Inc.'s debt-financed acquisition of all of the shares of the Optare Group, (Optare) of Leeds, U.K. for $US 28.5 million, making Optare a NABI, Inc. subsidiary. Anticipated benefits included immediate participation in the European market as well as eventual European market participation with a new, composite-structured bus then under development. Plans also included the derivation of certain left-hand-drive Optare products for U.S. and Hungarian markets.

Although NABI had previously expanded its Anniston facility in 1999 (new research and development center) and 2000 (new bus assembly plant), 2001 marked additional and substantial factory expansion, taking the Anniston plant from 110,000 to 250,000 square feet (10,000 to 23,000 m^{2}) (under roof). 2001 also marked derivation of the 30-foot NABI Model 30-LFN which was a left-hand-drive derivative of the recently developed Optare "Solo" being sold in the UK. Sale of these small low-floor buses commenced to private and public operators within the U.S. An additional outgrowth of the Optare acquisition was the sale of a small number of full-size (11 meter) NABI Model 700SE's the following year in Hungary. These were derived from the Optare Excel, and were produced on Scania chassis.

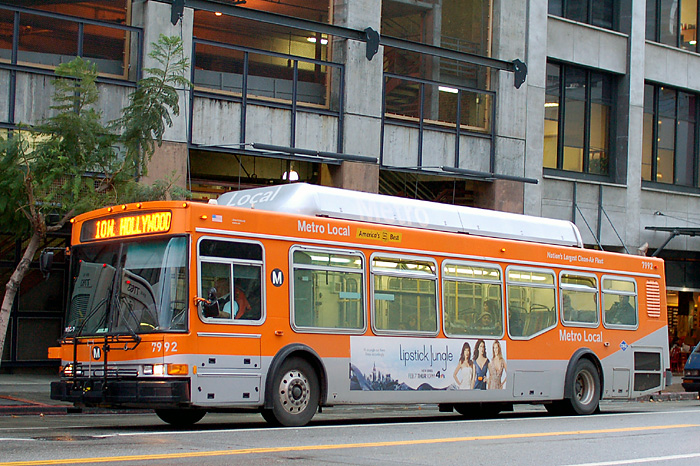
LA Metro NABI 40C-LFW "CompoBus"; styling is nearly identical to 40-LFW

In 2002, NABI Hungary completed construction of a new plant in Kaposvár, Hungary. This new plant was purpose-built for the manufacture of the CompoBus, a new, composite-structured low-floor bus. Production of CompoBuses began in earnest in 2003, with a significantly greater portion of this particular NABI product produced in Hungary than with other NABI products.

This new CompoBus manufacturing arrangement—unique for NABI—resulted in these buses being short of the FTA's normal Buy America requirements. However, NABI had sought Buy America waivers associated with the development of this new bus model, and had been granted two such waivers by the FTA. The first waiver allowed NABI to assemble its CompoBus outside the United States, and the second allowed it to count the composite chassis/frame as domestic for purposes of calculating the domestic component content of the vehicle. Both waivers applied to FTA funded procurements for which solicitations were issued within two years of the date of the waiver letter. That same year NABI introduced the 60-LFW, a new 60-foot low-floor articulated derivative of its 40-LFW model developed some years earlier.

NABI 60-BRT, on LA Metro's G Line busway, which it was designed for

In October 2004, NABI unveiled the new Model 60-BRT, which had been in development since early 2003. in response to LA Metro's request for a 60-foot low-floor articulated bus with rail-like styling for use on its new bus rapid transit route. Delivery of production versions began the following year, and a shorter, 42-foot derivative was eventually produced, making its debut at the American Public Transportation Association Bus & Paratransit Conference in May 2006.

After continuing disappointing financial results through 2004, NABI, Inc. sold its Optare subsidiary in 2005, and it also idled its composite bus production facility in Kaposvar, laying off 23% of its workforce in Hungary. The shutdown was due to uncertain future demand for the CompoBus and the weakened U.S. dollar. Also, in December 2005, the FTA refused to extend the previously granted waivers exempting the CompoBus from Buy America requirements.

=== Under Cerberus, 2006–2013 ===
In early 2006, NABI entered a preliminary agreement with affiliates of Cerberus Capital Management, L.P. (Cerberus) for the acquisition of all of the shares of NABI, Inc. and the business assets of NABI Rt. This transaction was completed in February 2006. (Concurrently, the Hungarian company that was not being acquired changed its name to ExBus, relegating itself to asset management unrelated to NABI.)

In August 2006, NABI announced its acquisition of Optima Bus Corporation in Wichita, Kansas (Optima) for an undisclosed amount. A short time later, it was announced that Cerberus had also acquired Blue Bird Corporation of Ft. Valley, Georgia (Blue Bird) thus rendering it a "sister" to NABI, Inc.

In June 2007, Optima's operations in Wichita were shut down, and work-in-process, inventory and tooling for Optima's products were moved to NABI's Anniston plant. At generally the same time, the work-in-process, tooling and inventory for Blue Bird's commercial buses were acquired by NABI and was also transferred to NABI, Inc.'s plant. NABI, Inc. elected to retain the names these products, and began producing these smaller buses at its Anniston, AL plant, thus adding Optima and Blue Bird brands to its product portfolio.

Generally at this same time, NABI also shifted the manufacture of its standard-floor model 416 unfinished buses from Hungary to newly leased facilities adjoining its existing Anniston plant. Under this arrangement, standard-floor body structures and other vehicle elements are fabricated at the adjoining facility and are then towed a short distance into NABI's final assembly operation.

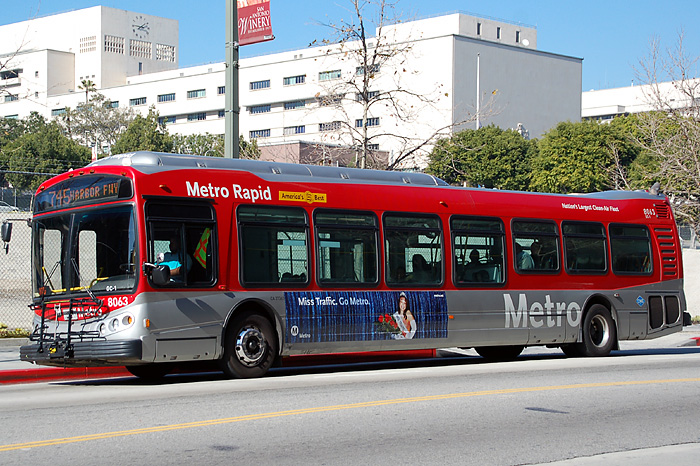
LA Metro NABI 45C-LFW "CompoBus"; the weight savings of the composite body meant this 45-foot bus weighed approximately the same as a conventional metal-bodied 40-foot bus.

In late 2007, NABI began re-commissioning its CompoBus production plant in Kaposvar, simultaneously shifting certain assembly operations to Anniston and thus rendering the CompoBus compliant with Buy America requirements. CompoBus deliveries resumed in 2008 without the need for further waivers from the FTA. Los Angeles County Metro placed the first order for revived CompoBus production in July 2008.

2008 also saw additional expansion at NABI's Anniston plant with the installation of a new, robotic paint system. This expansion took the Anniston plant to approximately 1/3 million square feet under roof, not including adjacent leased facilities used for manufacture of standard-floor unfinished buses.

Attempts to integrate the production of the smaller Optima and Blue Bird buses into NABI's operations eventually proved disruptive, and in 2010, NABI discontinued the production of its Optima and Blue Bird brand commercial bus products.

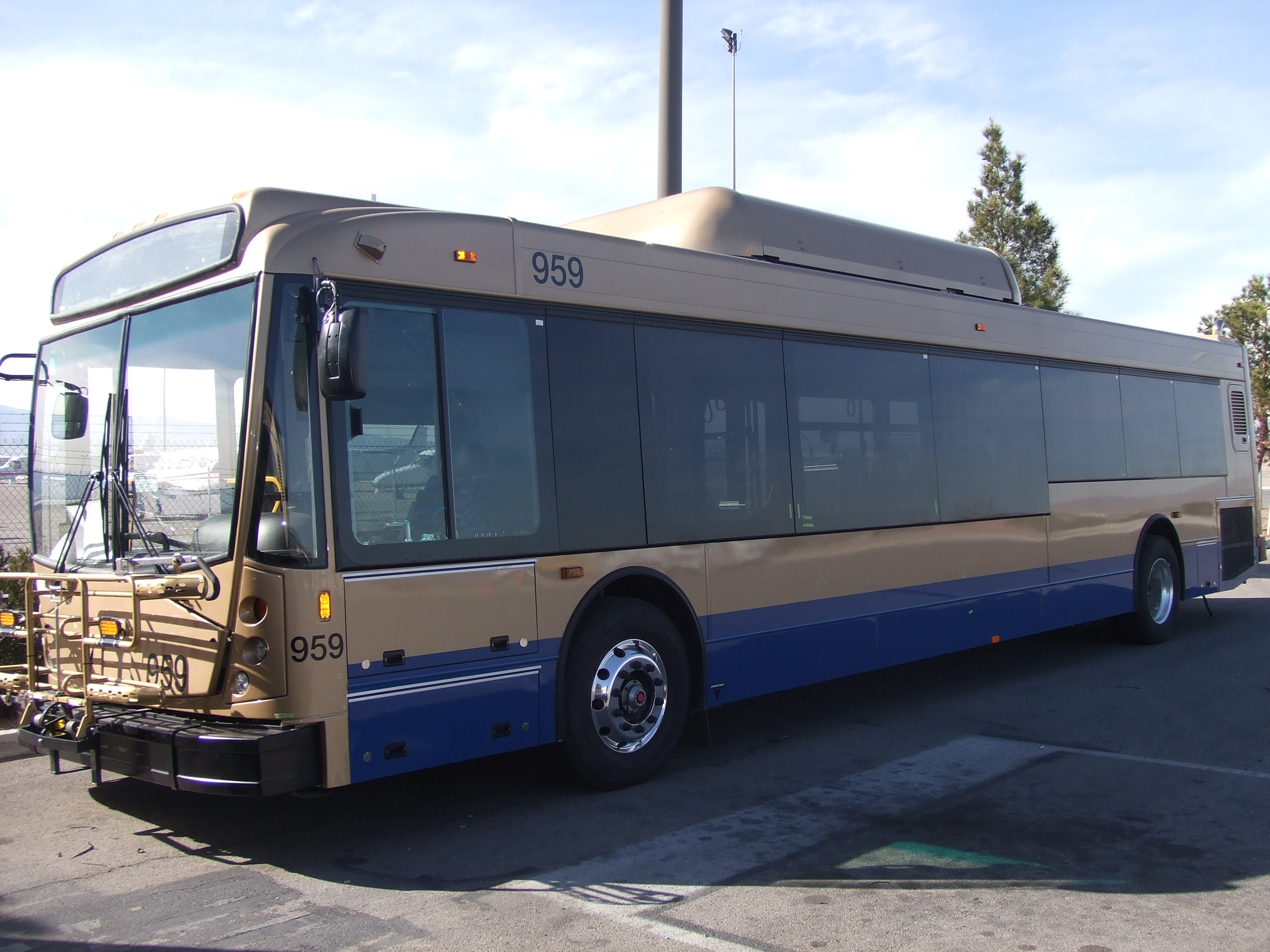
Facelifted (second-generation) NABI 40-LFW for Citizens Area Transit, serving Las Vegas; note small quarter windows between windshield and side window/front door.

The following year, NABI commissioned a new fabrication shop at its plant, equipped with robotic laser cutting equipment as well as tube bending and other new fabrication equipment. At approximately the same time, new body assembly tooling for low-floor buses was installed at its adjoining body fabrication facility. With these changes in place, NABI shifted the manufacturing of its metal-structured low-floor unfinished buses from Hungary to the same facility that had already begun manufacturing NABI's standard-floor products in Alabama a few years earlier.

Also in 2010, NABI unveiled its new 12-meter Sirius bus at its plant in Kaposvar, Hungary. This new product, produced on an MAN chassis, was developed for Hungarian public transportation operators.

In 2011, NABI unveiled new styling for its metal-structured low-floor product (nn-LFW) and its CompoBus. Restyling of both products was accomplished primarily by using a redesigned front mask, leaving the body structure unchanged from earlier versions of the same models. Also, a 40-foot CompoBus prototype incorporating the new styling was also produced.

NABI utilized various manufacturing arrangements throughout its history. Initially, rolling shells were assembled in Hungary and shipped to Anniston for finishing until 2011, when it began transitioning to produce its metal-structured products in Anniston; the transition was complete in late 2012. These metal-structured buses consisted of the standard-floor model 416 (40-foot length), the low-floor Model LFW (produced in 31-foot, 35-foot and 40-foot lengths) and the low-floor BRT (produced in 42-foot and 60-foot lengths). CompoBus shells were assembled at Kapsovár and finished in Anniston until the end of production in 2013.

=== Under New Flyer, 2013–2015 ===
On April 30, 2013, after completing a large order of CompoBuses for the Los Angeles County Metropolitan Transportation Authority, NABI produced its final CompoBus in Hungary. At the same time, NABI elected to discontinue promotion of its Hungarian Sirius bus, thus ending all production in Hungary and relegating all manufacturing and final assembly activities to its facilities in the USA.

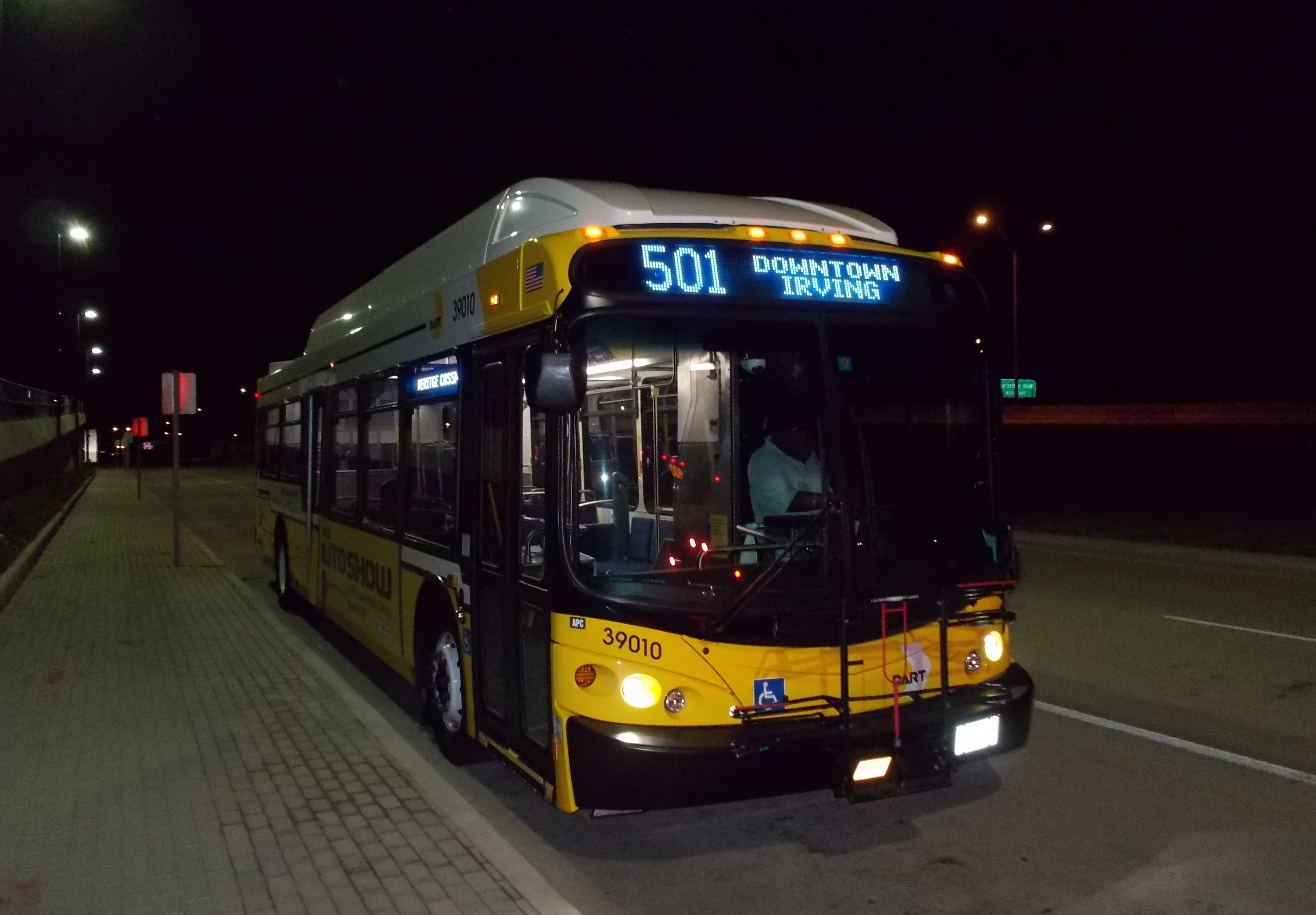
DART NABI 40-LFW Gen III; front quarter-windows have been eliminated. This bus is from the final order assembled at NABI.

On June 21, 2013, New Flyer Industries announced the acquisition of North American Bus Industries, Inc from Cerberus Capital Management, L.P. (Cerberus) for $79 million. The deal was completed later that day. However, New Flyer continued the NABI name for its existing bus products, which continued in production for the time being. This made NABI a subsidiary of New Flyer, using the legal name of NABI Bus, LLC. The Blue Bird school bus production assets were not included in the sale to New Flyer; they remain owned by Cerberus.

A second restyling was implemented in March 2014. In June 2014, New Flyer announced that the NABI product line would be discontinued after existing orders are filled. The last bus, a 40-LFW which was built for the Dallas Area Rapid Transit system, was completed in late October 2015. Since then, New Flyer has exclusively produced its Xcelsior heavy-duty transit bus product line at the former NABI Anniston plant, under the new name of New Flyer of America, Inc. New Flyer invested $20 million to retool the plant for Xcelsior production in 2015; a second expansion of the plant to 400,000 square feet (37,000 m^{2}), costing an additional $25 million, was announced in September 2017 and opened in November 2018.

== Models ==
Model name	Photo	Length	Fuel and propulsion type	Discontinued	Notes	Refs.
NABI BRT		42 ft (12.80 m); 60 ft (18.29 m)	CNG; Diesel; Diesel-electric hybrid Gasoline-electric hybrid	2015		
NABI LFW		32 ft (9.75 m); 36 ft (10.97 m); 40 ft (12.19 m); 60 ft (18.29 m)	CNG; Diesel; Diesel-electric hybrid LNG	2015		
416 (40-SFW)		40 ft (12.19 m)	CNG; Diesel; Diesel-electric hybrid	2014	Derived from Ikarus 415.	
CompoBus (4xC-LFW)	LACMTA 45-Foot CompoBus	40 ft (12.19 m); 45 ft (13.72 m)	CNG; Diesel; Diesel-electric hybrid	2013	Operators include Los Angeles Metro and Valley Metro.	
Sirius		42 ft (12.80 m)	CNG; Diesel; Diesel-electric hybrid	2013	Designed for the European market.	
436 (60-SFW)		60 ft (18.29 m)	Diesel	2008	Derived from Ikarus 435. The last set of buses were built in 2002 for SamTrans.	
30-LFN		30 ft (9.14 m)	Diesel	2005	A badge-engineered Optare Solo. Discontinued after NABI sold Optare.	
NABI-Optare 700 SE		40 ft (12.19 m)	Diesel	2000s	A badge-engineered Optare Excel, designed for the European market.	
