= Orion-Ikarus 286 =

Orion-Ikarus III 286
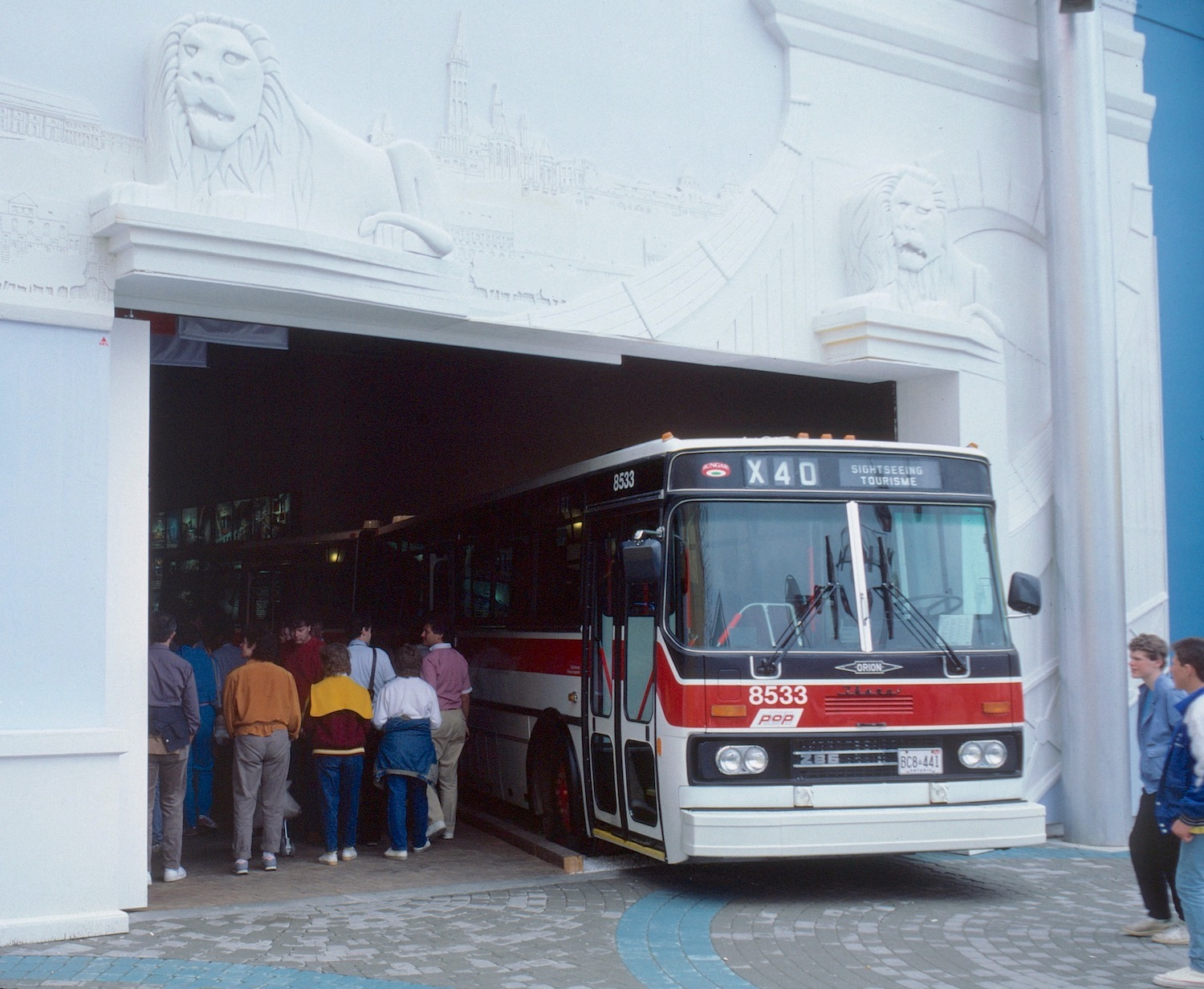
- An Orion-Ikarus bus of OC Transpo on display at Expo 86

Overview
- Manufacturer: Ikarus; Ontario Bus Industries
- Production: 1985-1989
- Assembly: Hungary: Budapest (unfinished shell); Canada: Mississauga, Ontario (finishing)

Body and chassis
- Class: Transit bus
- Body style: articulated
- Layout: Mid-mounted engine/"puller"
- Related: Crown-Ikarus 286

Powertrain
- Engine: Cummins NHHTC-300
- Transmission: 4-speed Allison HT747 or HTB748
- Propulsion: Diesel

Dimensions
- Length: 59 ft 7 in (18,160 mm) over bumpers
- Width: 102 in (2,600 mm)
- Height: 124 in (3,100 mm)
- Curb weight: 37,979 lb (17,227 kg)

Chronology
- Successor: Ikarus USA/NABI 436

The Orion-Ikarus 286, commonly known as the Orion III, was an articulated bus marketed to Canadian transit operators by Ontario Bus Industries (OBI). It was produced as a joint venture between Ikarus Body and Coach Works and OBI from 1985 to 1989, and deployed primarily in Ottawa (for OC Transpo) and Toronto (for the TTC). The Orion III fleets were retired prematurely due to corrosion, and all examples were withdrawn from service by 2003.

== Production and design ==
Rolling Ikarus 280 shells (frame and body) were built by Ikarus in Hungary, with modifications to conform with standard Canadian transit bus dimensions, and then shipped to OBI's plant in Mississauga, Ontario via Montreal, where final assembly (including the installation of a domestic powertrain, doors, windows and seats) was performed. The Orion III was built from 1985 to 1989. Local assembly also was used for the similar Crown-Ikarus 286 for the United States, finished and sold by Crown Coach Corporation in Los Angeles for the United States transit market.

The bus used a "puller" design, with the engine driving the middle axle. All three axles were built by Rockwell International; the non-powered front and rear axles were Model FL-941, and the powered middle axle was Model 59742W, equipped with a standard 4.56:1 drive ratio.

One demonstrator vehicle was assembled in 1984. It was later leased by Transit Windsor in June 1985 for service through the Detroit–Windsor Tunnel, then was sold to St. Catharines Transit in 1988. Eventually, the 1984 demo model was sold to OC Transpo (serving Ottawa, Ontario) for parts.

== Deployment ==
The first production contract was awarded to OBI by OC Transpo in November 1984. This was followed by an order from Toronto Transit Commission (TTC) for 90 buses in 1986; the cost of the TTC contract was CA$29 million. As delivered to the TTC, the Orion III had 61 seats and had a capacity of 107 riders. The first 9 Orion III buses for TTC were delivered in 1987 for acceptance testing, with revenue service anticipated to start in early 1988.

In service, the Orion III prematurely developed corrosion, and were retired starting in 1995. By 2003, both OC Transpo and TTC had completely retired their Orion III fleets.

=== Operators ===
Four transit agencies used the Orion III, but only 3 had them on full roster:

- OC Transpo of Ottawa, Ontario operated 189 buses from 1985 to 2003; the agency also acquired 25 ex-TTC Orion III buses in the late 1990s as well as the ex-demonstration bus from St. Catherines (for parts)
- Toronto Transit Commission of Toronto, Ontario operated 90 buses from late 1987 to 2003; some sold to OC Transpo
- St. Catharines Transit operated the ex-demonstration (1984) Orion III from 1988 to the early 1990s.

== Competitors ==
- GM New Look articulated (TA60-102N)
- New Flyer D60(HF)
