= NABI SFW =

American standard (high)-floor transit buses

NABI 416 / NABI 436
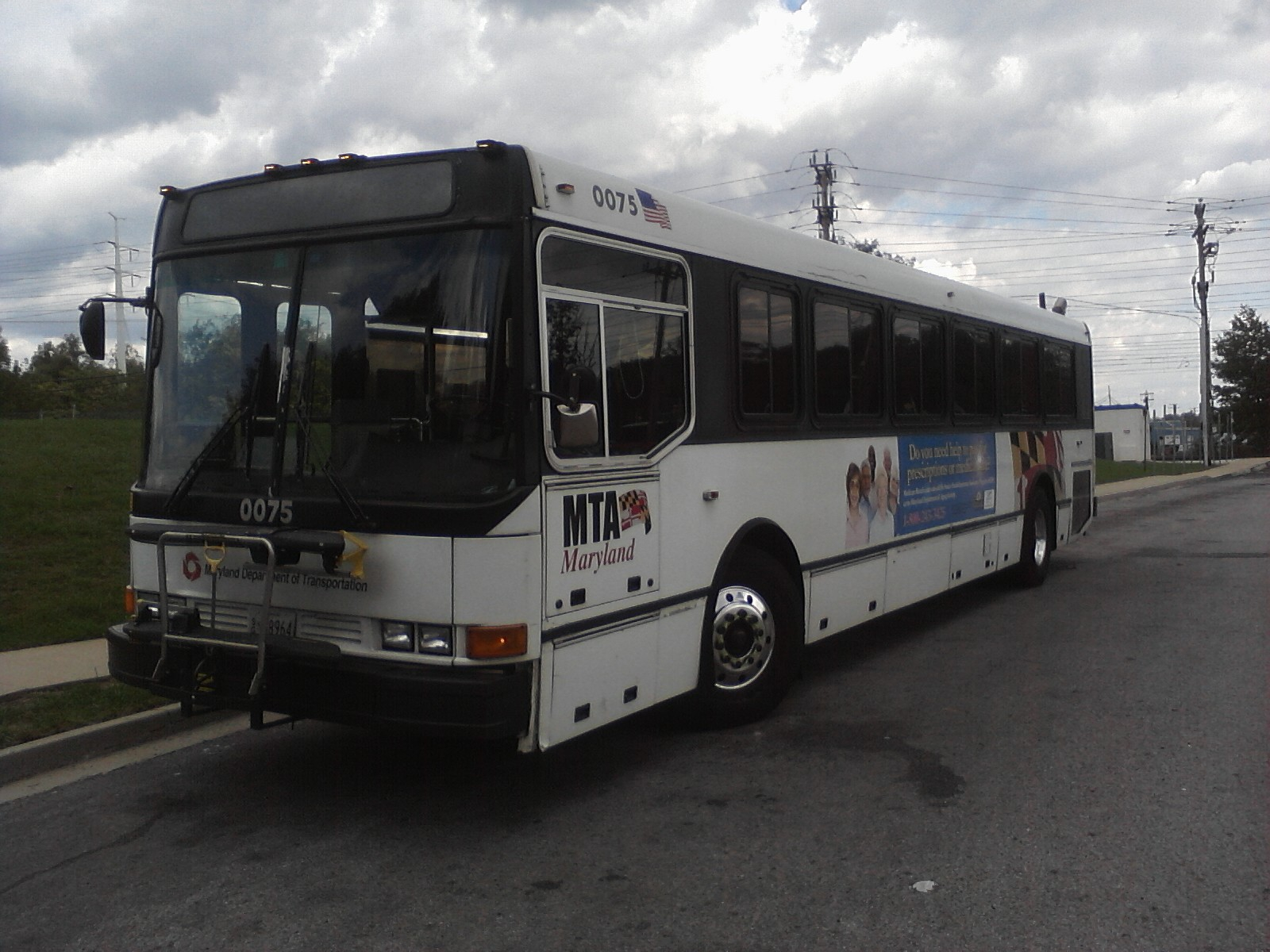
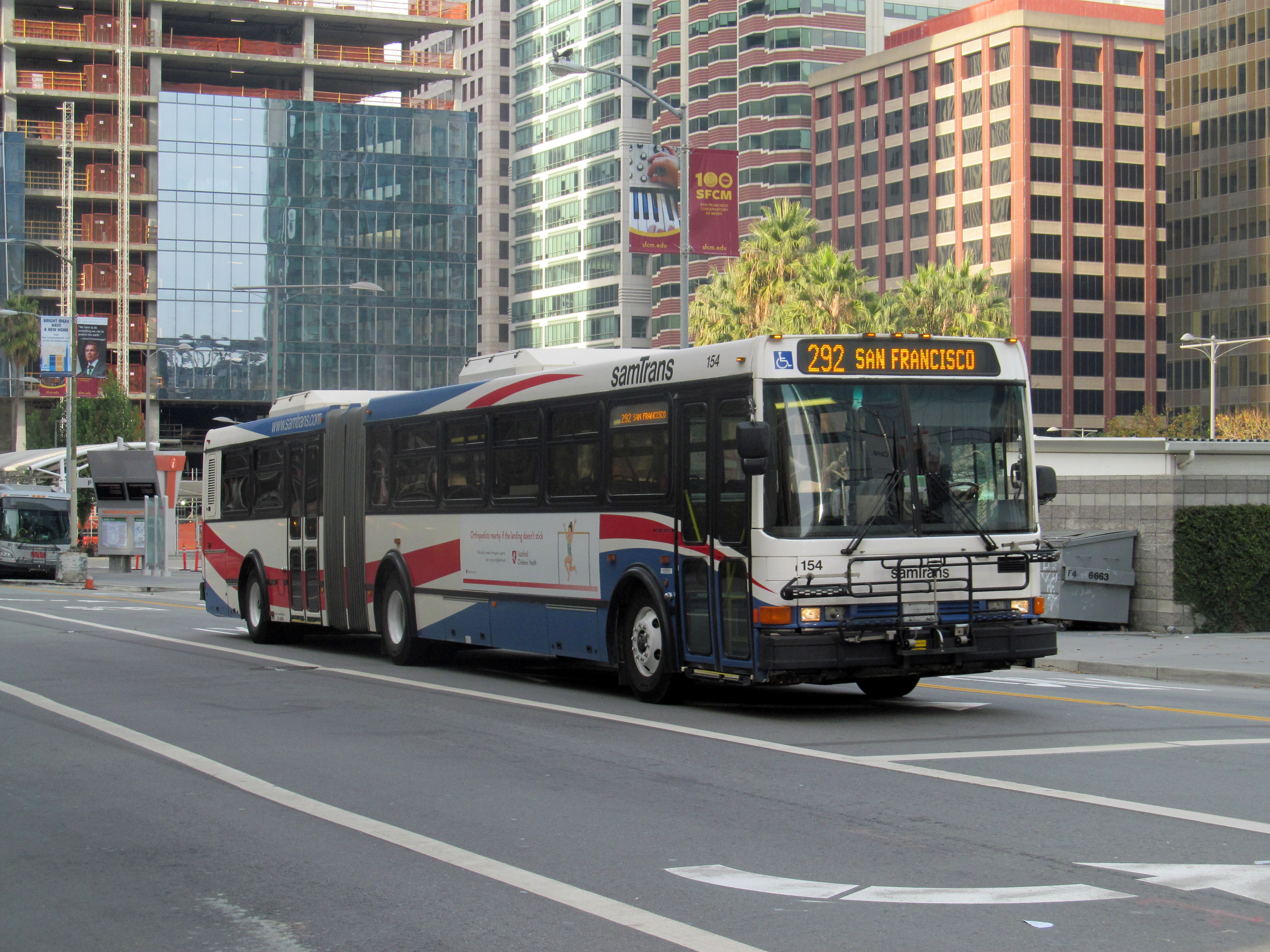
- Top: 416; Bottom: 436

Overview
- Manufacturer: Ikarus USA (1989–92); American Ikarus (1992–97); NABI (1997–2013)
- Also called: Ikarus 416; Ikarus 436; NABI 40-SFW; NABI 60-SFW
- Production: 1989–2013 (416); 1991–2002 (436)

Body and chassis
- Class: Transit bus
- Body style: Monocoque
- Layout: RR

Powertrain
- Engine: Cummins; Detroit Diesel
- Transmission: Allison; ZF

Dimensions
- Wheelbase: 264 in (6.71 m) (416); F:264 in (6.71 m) / R:232 in (5.89 m) (436)
- Length: over bumpers: 40 ft 9 in (12.4 m) (416); 59 ft 6 in (18.1 m) (436)
- Width: 102 in (2.59 m)
- Height: 118 in (3.00 m)
- Curb weight: 28,900 to 31,715 lb (13,100 to 14,400 kg) (416); 41,900 to 42,600 lb (19,000 to 19,300 kg) (436)

Chronology
- Predecessor: Crown-Ikarus 286; Orion-Ikarus 286
- Successor: NABI LFW

The NABI SFW series is a line of high-floor transit buses that was produced by American Ikarus and North American Bus Industries (NABI) from 1989 until 2013. It included two variants - the rigid 40' 416 and the 60' articulated 436 - which were sold with conventional diesel and CNG combustion engines and diesel-electric hybrid powertrains.

NABI introduced the low-floor LFW line in 1997 to supplement the older SFW line; both of the NABI bus product lines featured similar styling, with the LFW having comparatively taller side windows over the low-floor portion of the bus.

== History ==
Like the preceding Crown-Ikarus 286 and Orion-Ikarus 286 articulated buses sold in the 1980s, rolling shells for the SFW series were assembled by the Ikarus Bus company in Hungary and finished in the United States to meet Buy America requirements for federally-subsidized transit vehicles. After its partnership with Crown Coach dissolved in 1986, Ikarus entered a joint venture with Union City Body Company (UCBC) of Union City, Indiana to sell domestic versions of the rigid Ikarus 415 as the Ikarus USA 416, with final assembly occurring at the UCBC plant in Anniston, Alabama, starting in 1989. The articulated Ikarus USA 436 was added to the lineup in 1991.

The first 416 order was delivered to the Jacksonville Transportation Authority in 1989; the first 436 order was delivered to the Port Authority of Allegheny County in 1991.

Ikarus built a prototype 416 powered by liquefied natural gas (LNG) in 1991, claimed to be the first LNG-powered bus produced in the United States. The prototype was built at the request of Metro in Houston, and was completed three days before another bus was retrofitted with an LNG Detroit Diesel engine by Stewart & Stevenson. UCBC declared bankruptcy in 1992, after which production was resumed at Anniston under the auspices of American Ikarus, which was renamed North American Bus Industries (NABI) in 1997.

In 1998, NABI announced the SFW line would be available with a stainless steel frame as an option. The articulated 436 was discontinued in 2002, with the final order produced for SamTrans.

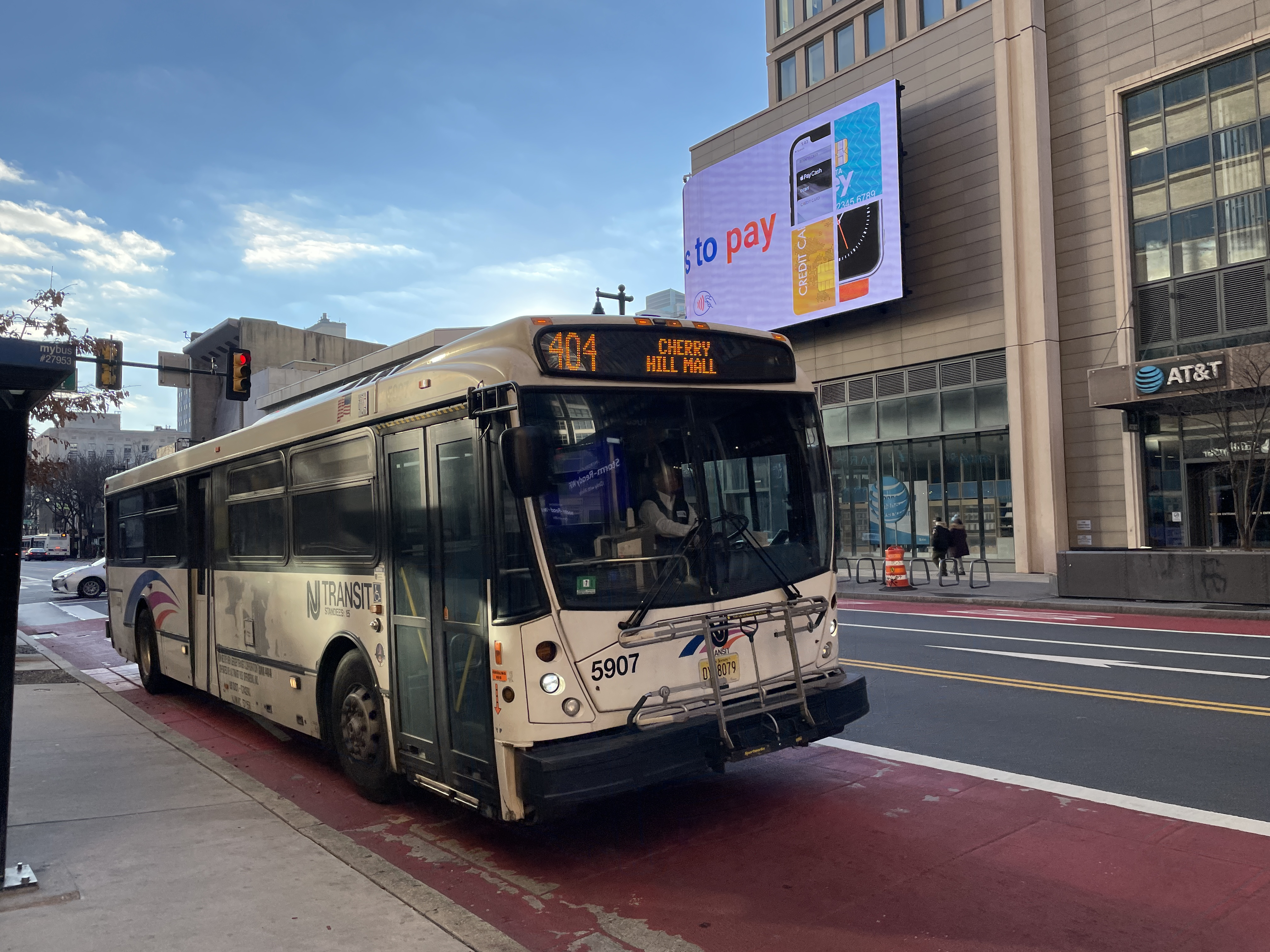
NABI 416.15 with 'Gen II' facelift, operated by NJ Transit

A 'Gen II' restyle of the 416 was unveiled in 2008, which added small quarter windows at the front between the windshield and the door or driver's side window, making the appearance similar to NABI's LFW Gen II (also unveiled in 2008). The restyled 416 was only ordered by NJ Transit.

416 bodies were assembled in Hungary until late 2012, when body production transitioned to Anniston. The 416 was discontinued in 2013, when NABI was sold to New Flyer Industries.

== Numbering ==
The NABI SFW line uses a model number incremented from the Hungarian model it was based on. The 40-foot NABI 416 is derived from the Ikarus 415 and the 60-foot NABI 436 is derived from the Ikarus 435. As an alternative, a model numbering scheme similar to that used for the LFW line was applied. In this alternative scheme, the 416 and 436 were designated as 40-SFW and 60-SFW respectively, providing the nominal length along with the standard floor height (SFW) family. On the stamped vehicle identification plate, the model was identified as 416.nn or 436.nn, with nn sequentially assigned according to the order number. In total, there were 16 orders for the 416 (416.00 to 416.15, with one order cancelled) and 11 orders for the 436 (436.00 to 436.10, with two cancelled).

== See also ==
Competing models

- Classic (transit bus)
- Flxible Metro
- Gillig Phantom
- Neoplan Transliner
- New Flyer High Floor
- Orion V
- Rapid Transit Series
