= Crown-Ikarus 286 =

Transit bus that was manufactured by Ikarus and Crown Coach Corporation

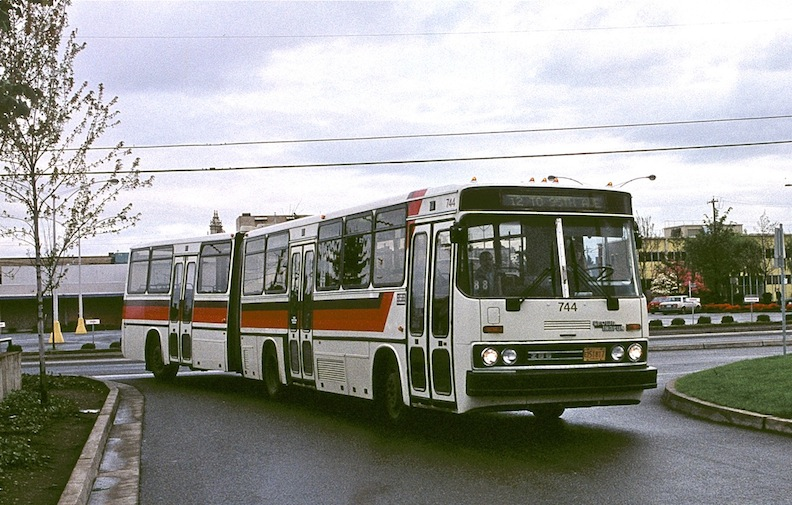
- TriMet #744, a 1982 Crown-Ikarus 286 in Portland, Oregon, in 1993

Overview
- Type: transit bus
- Manufacturer: Ikarus; Crown Coach Corporation
- Production: 1980–1986
- Assembly: Hungary: Budapest (initial assembly); United States: Los Angeles, California (final completion)

Body and chassis
- Body style: Articulated bus
- Layout: Mid-mounted engine/"puller" (6x2)
- Doors: 2 or 3
- Floor type: High floor
- Chassis: semi self-supporting with subframe
- Related: Orion-Ikarus 286/Orion III

Powertrain
- Engine: Cummins 855 cu in (14 L) NHHTC inline-6
- Transmission: 4-speed Allison HT740 automatic Voith D864.2 automatic

Dimensions
- Length: 55 ft (17 m; 660 in); 60 ft (18 m; 720 in)

Chronology
- Successor: NABI (Ikarus) 436

The Crown-Ikarus 286 is a type of transit bus that was manufactured for the U.S. market from 1980 until 1986, under a joint venture between the Ikarus Body and Coach Works (Ikarus), of Budapest, Hungary, and Crown Coach Corporation from Los Angeles, California in the United States. Loosely based on the Ikarus 280, the Crown-Ikarus 286 is a high-floor articulated bus.

Due to their use in the United States, the Crown-Ikarus buses became the first buses produced by Ikarus equipped with an onboard wheelchair lift.

After a number of production problems arose, the Crown-Ikarus 286 ended production in 1986, following the collapse of the joint venture. A total of 243 buses were produced for nine different operators.

Ikarus would again jointly produce the Ikarus 280 in North America with Ontario Bus Industries, in Canada, as the Orion III.

== Background ==
In the late 1970s, the era of the "New Look" mass-transit buses in the United States and Canada, which had begun in the late 1950s, was coming to a close. The two largest U.S. bus manufacturers, General Motors and Flxible, ended U.S. production of their New Look buses in 1977 and 1978, respectively. By the end of the decade, production would shift from a GM/Flxible near-monopoly to a contested segment, with a number of manufacturers competing for transit operators with new-generation bus designs.

To diversify its business beyond the fragile school bus industry of the late 1970s, California-based Crown Coach sought to enter transit bus production. While its chief competitor Gillig Corporation began design work on what would become the Gillig Phantom in 1982, Crown did not have the resources on its own to develop its own design from the ground up. In 1979, Crown entered into a partnership with Hungarian bus manufacturer Ikarus Body and Coach Works.

With an annual production of 13,000 transit vehicles (triple the combined output of all U.S. transit manufacturers), Ikarus was one of the largest bus manufacturers in the world, but had never previously built any vehicles for the U.S. market. In addition to Crown Coach gaining entry into the mass-transit segment, the partnership allowed Hungary to obtain hard currency and eased a trade imbalance between Eastern Europe and the West.

Under the terms of the joint venture, final assembly of the buses would be done in Crown Coach facilities in Los Angeles. In addition to finishing the vehicles to American standards, the final assembly in California involved most of the interior work, allowing customization of the buses to the needs of each end-user. Alongside various specifications for seating design, this allowed for the inclusion of features such as wheelchair lifts for passengers with disabilities.

Sales contracts of the vehicles were managed by Crown Coach, which helped ensure that the work satisfied U.S. federal "Buy America" requirements (49 U.S.C. § 5323j). All buses manufactured under the Crown-Ikarus name were considered model 286, although different orders carried a seldom-noted numerical suffix (such as 286.02 for Portland TriMet).

== Production history ==
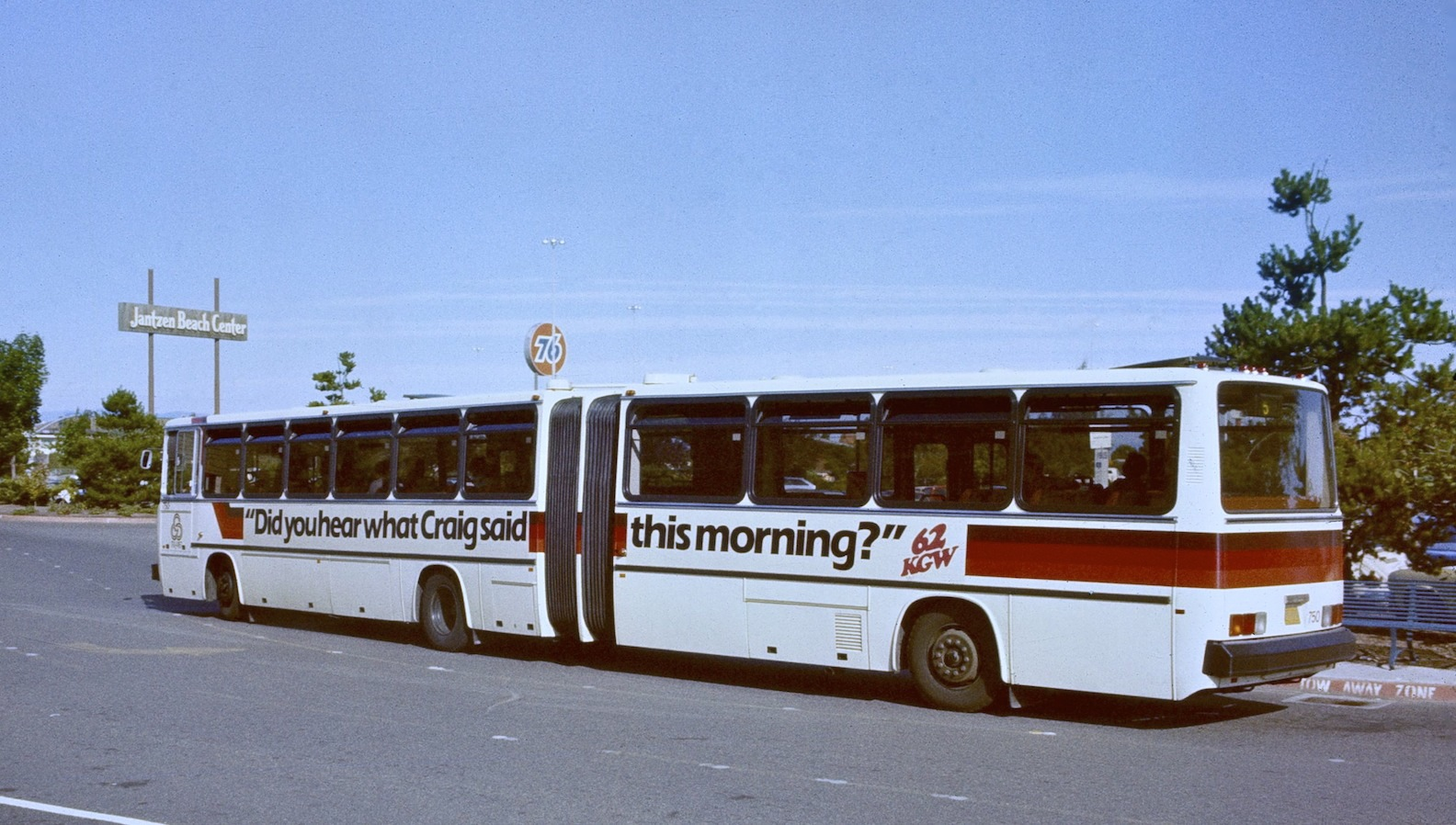
View of left side and rear of a 60-foot Crown-Ikarus bus

The first order for the Crown-Ikarus was placed in November 1979. In its Budapest factory, Ikarus produced the body shells of its Ikarus 280 articulated transit bus modified for the North American market. The largest change was the overall width of the bodyshell, from a metric-based 98.4 inches (2,500 mm) to the 102 inches (2,591 mm) body width that was becoming common in transit buses in North America. After shipment to Crown Coach in Los Angeles, the fabricated body shells were fitted with engines, transmissions and brakes. Other major assemblies included the destination signs and interior. For the first vehicles, the engines and transmissions were shipped to Hungary for installation, but subsequent examples saw the entire powertrain fitted at the Crown Coach factory.

Two different configurations of the Crown-Ikarus 286 were sold: 55-foot (16.8 m) and 60-foot (18.3 m) lengths, with either two or three entry doors. Aside from five Houston Metro examples fitted in a 61-seat suburban configuration, all versions were fitted with transit-style seats. In its 60-foot configuration, the passenger capacity was 73.

To save on development costs, the Crown-Ikarus was fitted with the engines of the Crown Supercoach school bus, which was designed for a 20-year service life. The first examples of the Crown-Ikarus 286 used a 290 hp Cummins NHHTC underfloor diesel engine, changed to a 300 hp Cummins NHHTC in later versions. An optional 350 hp Cummins was chosen by the Milwaukee County Transit System. Most vehicles were fitted with an Allison automatic transmission (models HT-747D or 748s). However, a Voith D864.2 automatic transmission was fitted for vehicles operated in Houston, and for five of 40 purchased by Milwaukee. The axles were also U.S.-made.

In the mid- to late 1980s, TriMet replaced the Cummins engines in its Crown-Ikarus buses with Detroit Diesel DDA 6-71 engines in an effort to improve reliability and reduce maintenance costs by standardizing with the rest of the agency's fleet.

Ikarus also hoped to sell a trolleybus version of the 286 in North America through Crown Coach. With this in mind, an Ikarus 280T3 articulated trolleybus was transported to North America, and in 1981–1982 was demonstrated on the Mexico City, San Francisco, and Seattle trolleybus systems. Ultimately, no orders were received, and Crown Coach did not build any trolleybuses.

=== Post-production issues ===
Various problems were experienced with the completed buses during their use, including doors malfunctioning and windows coming out. In Portland, Oregon, which had more Crown-Ikarus buses than any other transit system, owner Tri-Met found that its 87 buses needed numerous repairs and modifications, to fix what it considered to be significant defects. The agency worked with the manufacturer to correct many of them, but carried out some of the repairs and modifications itself, sometimes at its own expense. In 1985, when the buses involved were three to four years old, Tri-Met filed a lawsuit against the manufacturers, alleging breach of contract. The suit identified 45 separate defects, including frame cracks, and charged that Crown Coach and Ikarus had been unable or unwilling to correct all of them. Tri-Met officials said the problems and frequent breakdowns of the buses led to there being days when only about 50 of the 87 buses were operational. According to Tri-Met, the issue was compounded by maintenance diagrams that were "written mostly in Hungarian". The lawsuit was later postponed, as the parties hoped to settle their differences out of court, and 17 months after the suit was filed, Tri-Met announced that a settlement had been reached. The warranties on Tri-Met's buses, which had originally been for one to two years but been extended, were now extended through 1992, but most other details of the 1987 settlement were not released publicly.

By 1986, Crown Coach had already ceased taking orders for the Crown-Ikarus 286, and production under the joint venture ended. Ikarus re-entered the U.S. market on its own in 1989 as Ikarus USA, which after a series of reorganizations became North American Bus Industries (NABI) in 1996.

== Operators ==
Crown-Ikarus buses were sold new to a total of only nine transit systems, all located in the United States. One additional operator obtained its Crown-Ikarus buses secondhand, though a lease.

Operator	Location	Quantity	Notes
TARC	Louisville, Kentucky	15	Delivered in 1980, the first Crown-Ikarus 286 buses sold.
TriMet	Portland, Oregon	87	Delivered from 1981 to mid-1982; the largest purchase of the 286. All had three doors; the rear door was fitted with a wheelchair lift.
Houston Metro	Houston, Texas	50	Delivered in 1985. Five of 50 were fitted with 61 reclining seats (known as suburban-style seats, all forward-facing).
MCTS	Milwaukee, Wisconsin	40	Ordered in November 1982; production was due to start in November 1983, but was delayed by problems at Crown Coach. First unit was delivered mid-1984, but was returned to manufacturer for modifications; deliveries resumed in November 1984. Series was retired in 2000.
SamTrans	San Mateo County, California	10	Delivered in 1981.
Capital District Transportation Authority	Albany, New York	8	Delivered in 1984.
Santa Clara County Transportation Agency	San Jose, California	15	Leased to AC Transit in 1988.
TheBus	Honolulu, Hawaii	8	
Jacksonville Transportation Authority (JTA)	Jacksonville, Florida	10	
AC Transit	Oakland, California	N/A	Leased 15 buses from Santa Clara County from 1988.

== See also ==
- Ontario Bus Industries, which produced similar Ikarus buses in Canada from 1986 to 1989, known as the Orion-Ikarus 286
