= New Look bus =

New Look bus may refer to:

- Flxible New Look bus, a very popular transit bus produced by The Flxible Company from 1960 until 1978
- GM New Look bus, also commonly known by the nickname "Fishbowl" (for its six-piece rounded windshield), a transit bus introduced in 1959 by Truck and Coach Division of General Motors and produced until 1986
- Western Flyer D700 bus, introduced in 1967 by Western Flyer Coach, which became New Flyer in 1986
