= New Flyer High Floor =

American passenger bus type

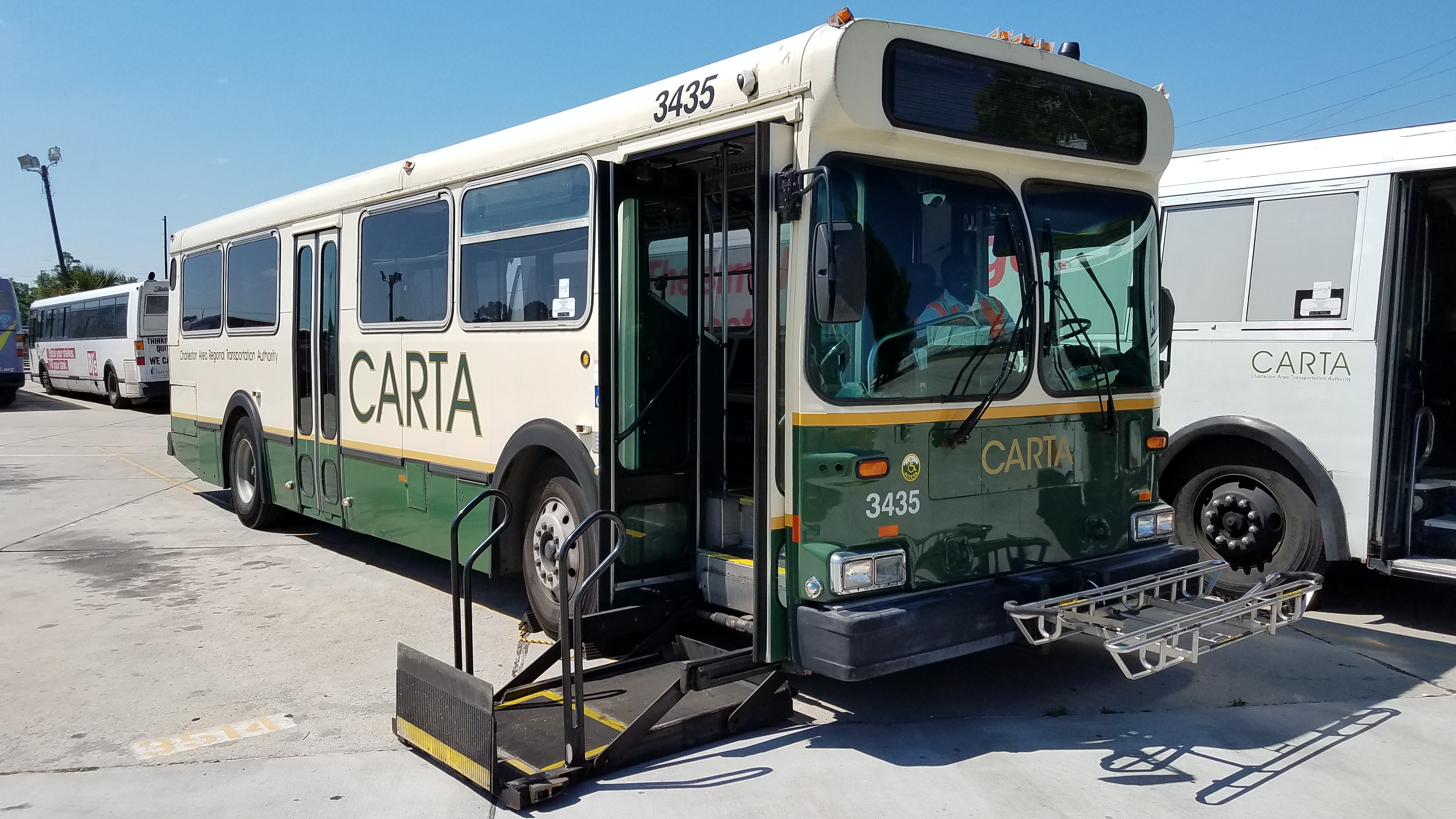
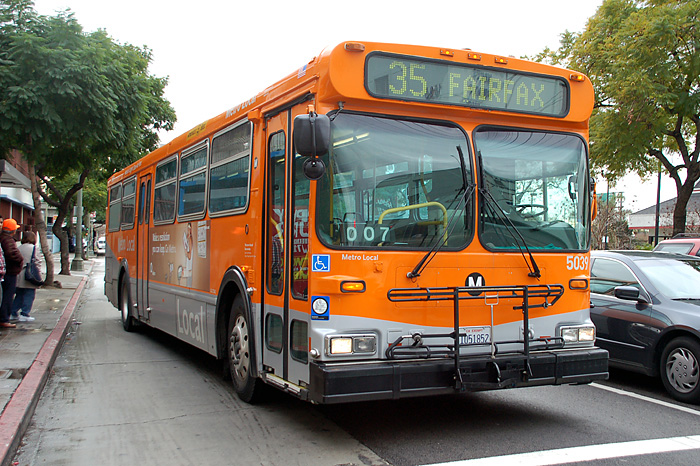
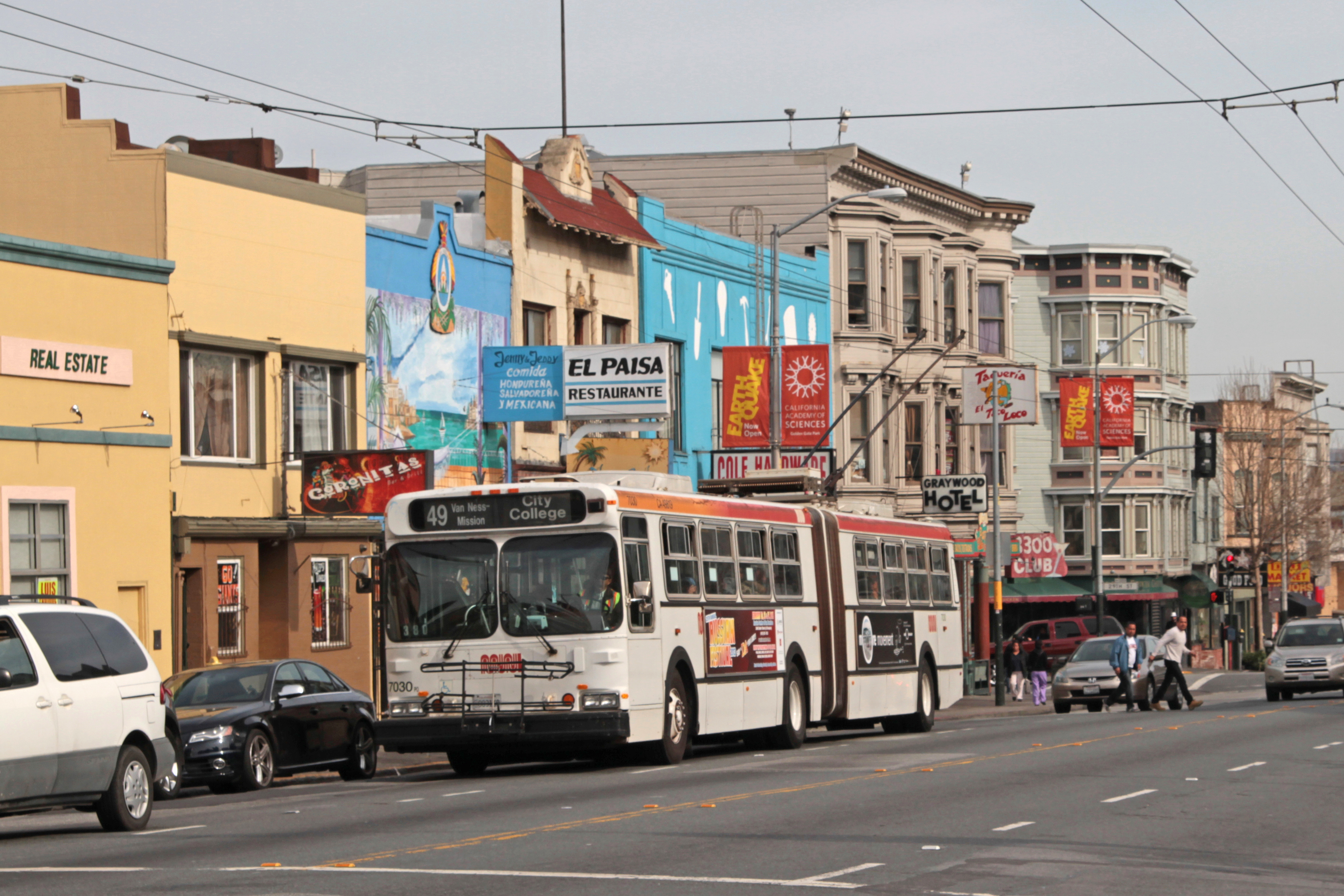
- Top: New Flyer D35 high floor (2018); Middle: C40 high floor (2008); Bottom: E60 high floor (articulated, 2013)

Overview
- Manufacturer: New Flyer
- Production: Diesel 35' and 40': 1987–1996; Diesel 45': 1998 - 1999; CNG/LNG 35' and 40': 1994–1999; Articulated: 1987–2006

Body and chassis
- Class: Transit bus
- Body style: semi-monocoque
- Layout: RR

Powertrain
- Engine: Cummins L10 (diesel); Detroit Diesel 6V92TA(C) (diesel); Detroit Diesel S50 (CNG & diesel); Cummins C8.3 (CNG & diesel)
- Transmission: Allison; Voith; ZF

Dimensions
- Wheelbase: 218.4 in (5.55 m) (35'); 279 in (7.09 m) (40'); F:208 in (5.28 m) / R:309 in (7.85 m) (60' artic)
- Length: 35 ft 3 in (10.7 m) (35'); 40 ft 6 1/4 in (12.4 m) (40'); 60 ft 8 in (18.5 m) (60' artic)
- Width: 102 in (2.59 m)
- Height: 121 1/2 to 128 in (3.09 to 3.25 m)
- Curb weight: 27,250 lb (12,400 kg) (D35); 30,200 lb (13,700 kg) (C40); 28,500 lb (12,900 kg) (D40); 42,250 lb (19,200 kg) (D60)

Chronology
- Predecessor: Flyer 700/800/900 series
- Successor: New Flyer Low Floor

The New Flyer High Floor is a line of conventional (high-floor) transit buses available in 35-foot rigid, 40-foot rigid, and 60-foot articulated lengths manufactured by New Flyer Industries between 1987 and 2006. The buses were powered by conventional diesel or natural gas engines using either V-drive or T-drive transmission couplings, with the exception of an articulated electric trolleybus variant manufactured for a single customer, the San Francisco Municipal Railway. The New Flyer Low Floor, a low-floor bus with a similar external appearance, was introduced in 1991 and proved to be more popular than the High Floor, which was discontinued in 1996 in diesel rigid form. CNG high-floor buses continued to be made until 1999, and the articulated version was manufactured until early 2006.

== Design ==
Model Codes
Motive power	Length	Model
C = compressed natural gas D = diesel E = electric trolleybus L = liquefied natural gas	35 = 35 feet (11 m); 40 = 40 feet (12 m); 60 = 60 feet (18 m) articulated	-## = Year of manufacture (used between 1987 and 1990)

For example, a New Flyer D40-88 is a 40-foot (nominal) rigid high-floor bus with conventional diesel power, built in 1988. The -## suffix was used between 1987 and 1990. After this time, no suffix was added to the model number, while buses from the Low Floor series, which were introduced in 1991, did have LF for a suffix. The articulated D60 high floor model had the model name Galaxy, but it wasn't commonly known by that name.

The trolleybus was only made in a 60-foot articulated version (E60) for a single agency, Muni.

The New Flyer High Floor uses a tubular side construction clad with either aluminum or fiberglass panels; wheel housings are made of stainless steel, and stepwells have the option of either stainless steel or fiberglass. To reduce weight, the roof, front, and rear panels are made from fiberglass. All buses are equipped with rear-mounted engines using either V- or T-drive couplings to the transmission driving the rear axle; since the D60 articulated buses use the "pusher" configuration, the articulation joint is equipped with an anti-jackknifing feature.

== Deployment ==
The first New Flyer High Floor buses were model D40-87, delivered to the Toronto Transit Commission and Winnipeg Transit in 1987. AC Transit was the first customer for the D35-88 (1988, along with Santa Cruz METRO) and the D60 articulated model (1989). The first deliveries of natural gas-powered variants occurred in 1995: BC Transit, Los Angeles County Metropolitan Transportation Authority, and San Diego Metropolitan Transit System for the C40; Sun Metro (El Paso) for the L40.

The only E60 trolleybus variants built were a fleet of 60 sold to San Francisco Municipal Railway (Muni) in 1993, that agency's first use of articulated trolleybuses. The last of the E60s were retired in 2015. The last E60 (Muni #7031) was briefly put up for auction in 2019 before Muni withdrew the auction at the request of interested preservation groups.

== Competition ==
- Rapid Transit Series
- Classic (transit bus)
- Flxible Metro
- Gillig Phantom
- NABI 416
- Neoplan AN440
- Orion V
