= Crown Coach Corporation =

American bus manufacturer (1904-1991)

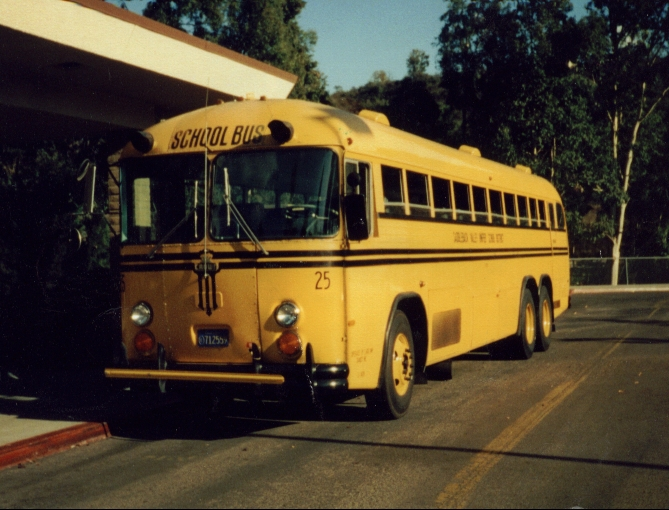
- 1978 Crown Coach 90-passenger Supercoach school bus Model 2A-426-11
- Industry: Transportation
- Founded: Los Angeles, California (1904)
- Founder: Don Brockway
- Defunct: March 1991
- Fate: Dissolved
- Headquarters: Los Angeles, California (1904–1984); Chino, California (1984–1991)
- Area served: West Coast, United States
- Products: School Buses; Fire Apparatus
- Number of employees: 270 (1991)
- Parent: GE Railcar (1987-1991)

Crown Coach Corporation (founded as the Crown Carriage Company) was an American bus manufacturer. Founded in 1904, the company was best known for its Supercoach range of yellow school buses and motorcoaches; the former vehicles were marketed throughout the West Coast of the United States. Competing alongside Gillig Corporation and similar its Gillig Transit Coach, the two companies supplied California with school buses nearly exclusively into the 1980s. Crown also was the manufacturer of custom-built vehicles derived from its buses, including the Firecoach line of fire apparatus.

For 80 years, Crown was headquartered in Los Angeles, California. In 1984, the company relocated its headquarters and manufacturing to Chino, California, where it operated until its closure. In March 1991, Crown Coach (then a subsidiary of GE Railcar) ended operations; at the time, the company was struggling against declining demand for school buses.

== History ==
=== 1904–1920: Wagons to school buses ===
At the beginning of the 20th century, Don M. Brockway found himself working at the first hardware store in Los Angeles, California. To supplement its income, the hardware store sold parts for wagons and carriages. In 1904, Brockway founded Crown Carriage Company, beginning life producing horse-drawn carriages. While the first vehicles were built in a wooden shed, the company moved to a brick factory in 1910.

After 1910, as carriages gradually became "horseless", Crown experimented with building truck bodies. In 1916, the company built its first bus body for transit use; it was an open-air design heavily influenced by wagon design. After World War I, Crown built its first body for school bus use.

=== 1921–1949: Airplanes, metal bodies, and Supercoaches ===
In 1921, a major shift in company production occurred as Murillo M. "Brock" Brockway (the son of the company founder) was put in charge of school bus production. Viewing school buses as a growth market in the suburbs of southern California, Brockway discontinued all wagon production in favor of bus and truck body production. To expand production and improve shipping of its vehicles, a much larger factory in Los Angeles was opened in 1923.

In pursuit of developing heavier-duty and higher-capacity school buses, Crown introduced the first school bus with dual rear wheels in 1927 (on a Reo chassis). In 1930, it produced its first all-metal school bus body, with a 43-passenger capacity (on a Mack chassis).

In 1927, the company changed its name, becoming the Crown Motor Carriage Company. In 1929, the Aircraft Division (founded in 1925) licensed the Kinner Airster airframe and it was manufactured as the Crown B-3 between 1930 and 1933.

1932 would mark several major changes for the company. As part of his taking over day-to-day operations of Crown from his father, MM Brockway introduced a ground-breaking school bus body; elements of its design would change school bus design forever. To improve forward visibility, the new bus was a cab-forward design, with the driver sitting next to the engine and radiator. To improve safety, the bus was designed with an integral chassis; the windows were mesh-reinforced safety glass. Alongside the standard braking system, the bus also was equipped with two backup braking systems.

In 1933, Crown changed its name to Crown Body and Coach Corporation, with the Brockway family reacquiring complete control of the company three years later.

After it was dubbed the Crown Supercoach in 1935, the Crown cab-forward bus underwent a series of changes during the late 1930s. The new design introduced an all-steel body, air brakes, and an integrated body and chassis. To increase seating capacity to 79 passenger, Crown introduced a mid-engine Supercoach, using a horizontally mounted Hall-Scott gasoline engine. To supplement school bus production, Crown produced intercity motorcoaches (among the first air conditioned designs) and custom-built delivery vans.

In 1939, Crown acquired Moreland Motor Truck Company, relocating to its Los Angeles factory (where it remained until the 1980s); the company was renamed Crown Coach Corporation. A previous chassis supplier to Crown, the Moreland facility led to several changes, including the adoption of a rear-engine configuration for 1940, along with a rear exit window and a side emergency exit door.

During World War II, the company saw few contracts for war production, receiving only a few requests to produce fire engine bodies for four-wheel drive truck chassis. Following the war, the company returned to bus production, beginning design work on an all-new Supercoach for 1948. As a side project, engineers at the company designed an all-new cabover fire engine, using the mid-engine chassis of the Supercoach bus. In 1951, the first Crown Firecoach prototype was completed after two years of design work. Alongside the initial pumper design, Crown developed several configurations of the Firecoach, including water tenders, tiller and ladder trucks, and quints (TeleSquirts).

In the United States during the years immediately following World War II, population growth of suburbs expanded, fueled by the post-war baby boom. As that segment of the population entered school, demand for new schools (and school buses to transport their students) rapidly rose. In 1946, Crown began development on a new mid-engine Supercoach. Heavily influenced by motorcoach design, Crown intended it primarily for school bus use.

Introduced in 1949, the all-new Supercoach used unit-body construction with high-strength steel in place of a separate chassis; to combat corrosion, all body panels were aluminum. To prove the durability of the Supercoach to potential customers, Crown offered the Supercoach with a 20-year/100,000 mile warranty for the body.

=== 1950–1980: Mid-engine school buses ===
During the mid-1950s, Crown made several changes to the Supercoach. In 1954, the company introduced the first diesel-engined school bus when it introduced the horizontally mounted Cummins NHH inline-6 as an option. In 1955, Crown developed the largest school bus in the United States. By lengthening the bodyshell to 40 feet (then the maximum for school buses and motorcoaches) and adding a second rear axle, Crown raised the seating capacity from 79 to 91 passengers. As a later option, some school districts ordered the Supercoach with a 16th row of seats (further expanding seating to 97 passengers). Along with its Gillig counterpart, the 97-passenger Crown Supercoach is the highest-capacity school bus ever sold in the United States.

From the 1950s to the 1970s, school bus production on the West Coast evolved separately from the rest of the United States, with the Crown Supercoach and the similar Gillig Transit Coach holding a near-monopoly of the school bus segment in California and a large share of the rest of the West Coast. Outside of the region, many operators continued use of lower-capacity conventional-type buses based upon truck chassis. In place of developing such a design from the ground up, both Crown and Gillig chose to serve as the West Coast distributor for other manufacturers. At various times, Crown would market Wayne, Blue Bird, and Thomas Built Buses in California.

Sharing much of its underlying structure with the Crown school bus, the intercity Crown Supercoach was marketed with several configurations. Along with an underfloor configuration, Crown also produced a rear-engine version, as well as a raised-floor configuration (along with a version similar to the Scenicruiser); the latter two provided for increased luggage space. In 1969, Crown supplemented sales of the Supercoach by becoming one of the first distributors of Quebec-assembled Prevost Car motorcoaches in the United States.

The Firecoach was produced through the 1960s and 1970s with relatively few changes. While sold primarily across the West Coast, examples of the Crown Firecoach were purchased by fire departments across the United States. In 1965, a roof was made standard for all Firecoaches, in the interest of firefighter safety.

=== 1980–1991: Decline ===
In 1979, the Brockway family sold Crown Coach Corporation to a local truck distributor; this began a sequence of ownership changes. Due to slow sales, Crown ended production of the motorcoach version of the Supercoach in 1980, focusing entirely on school buses. The same year, the company was renamed Crown Coach International.

To diversify production beyond its Supercoach school buses, Crown entered into a joint venture with the Hungarian firm Ikarus in 1980 to market its first mass-transit bus. The longest and widest bus ever produced by the company, the articulated Crown-Ikarus 286 is 102 inches wide and 60 feet long. Under the joint venture, though the bodies were assembled by Ikarus in Hungary and imported to California, to meet "Buy America" requirements, the vehicles underwent final assembly by Crown Coach, including the entire interior and the fitment of the American-sourced powertrain (sourced from the Supercoach). In 1986, the partnership ended, with 243 examples produced.

By 1982, sales of the aging Firecoach had largely collapsed, leading to a temporary hiatus in its production. After 34 years of production and with slightly over 1,800 examples produced, the final Firecoach was produced in 1985.

Early in the 1980s, Crown also began to lose its distributorship sales. In 1983, its Prevost agreement ended, with competitors Wayne, Blue Bird, and Thomas establishing their own West Coast sales networks by the same time; the latter two manufacturers also marketed the competitive All American and Saf-T-Liner buses across the United States.

During 1984, Crown moved its headquarters and production from Los Angeles to Chino, California in San Bernardino County; though intended to increase production, demand for new Supercoaches did not meet the capability. At the end of 1986, Crown Coach entered into receivership; in addition to the closure of production, the Los Angeles factory (which it had owned since 1939) was sold. In April 1987, the company was purchased at auction by GE Railcar. After a reorganization as Crown Coach, Incorporated, production in Chino restarted in July 1987.

As the 1980s ended, the Crown Supercoach had reached over 40 years of production with only minor evolutionary changes made through its production. In 1989, the California Energy Commission began a study to test low-emission school buses, using methanol-fueled vehicles as part of the test. Crown Coach was a manufacturer selected to take part of the study, using a methanol-fuel Detroit Diesel 6V92 engine. The fitment of the engine required an extensive update of the rear bodywork of the Supercoach, leading to a matching update of the front bodywork. Although not a completely new design, the Series II, as it was named, was the first major update to the Supercoach since 1948.

After operating Crown since 1987, GE Railcar continued to find the business unprofitable; by 1990, Crown was already for sale. After an unsuccessful attempt by GE to find a buyer, Crown Coach announced its closure March 31, 1991 in October 1990; the key reason behind the closure cited was Crown's difficulty competing with lower-capacity buses produced at a lower price.

In May 1991, the assets of Crown Coach would be purchased by Carpenter Body Works; this included tooling and intellectual property of the company. At the time, Carpenter had wanted to restart production of the Crown Supercoach II in its Indiana facility, but it deemed the unibody design of the Supercoach too complex and expensive for large-scale production. In 1992, Carpenter introduced a Carpenter RE school bus, including the headlight design and several interior components of the Supercoach II. From 1996 to 1999, Carpenter branded itself as Crown by Carpenter, using a brand emblem introduced by Crown Coach shortly before its closure.

== Products ==
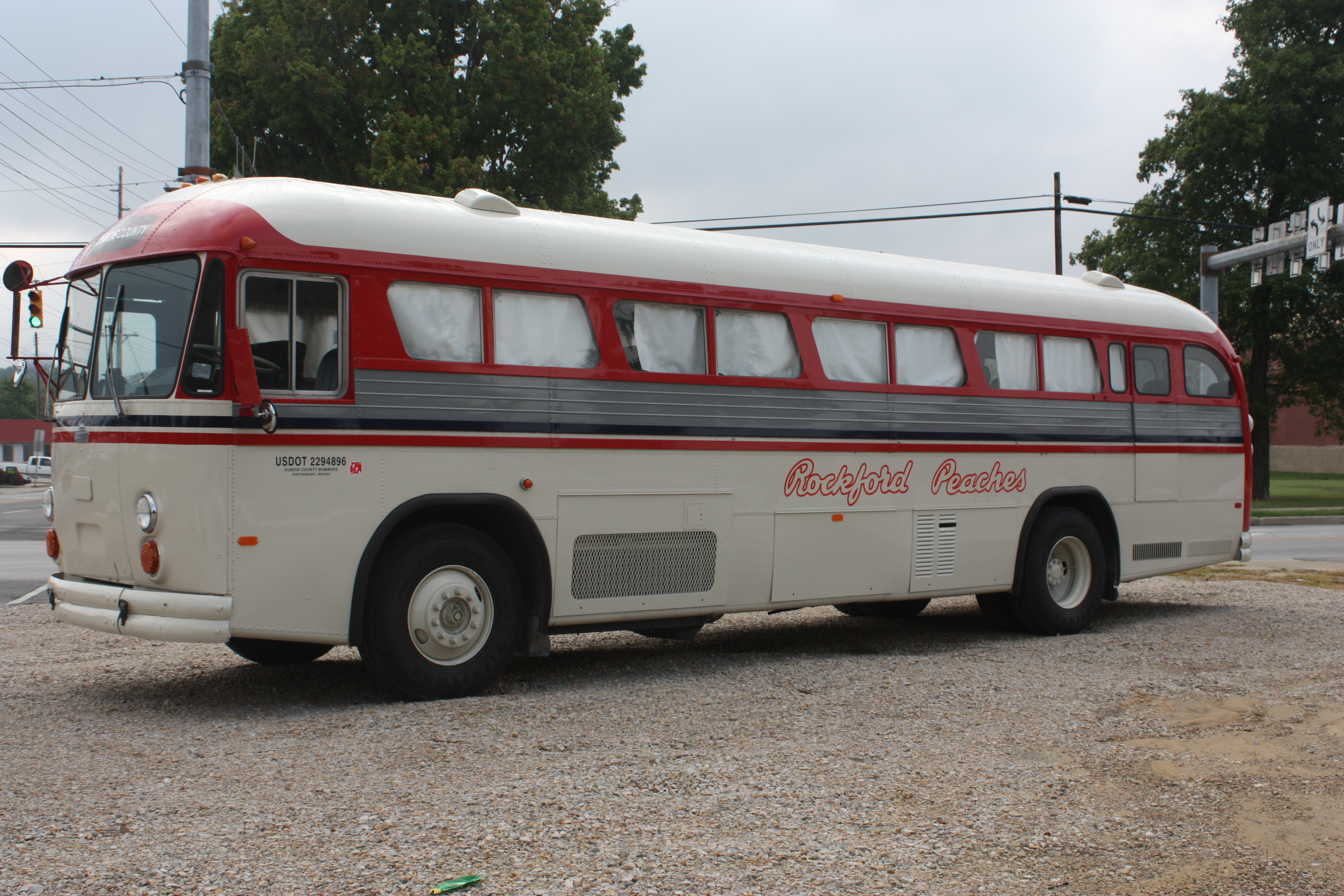
1980s Crown Supercoach motorcoach

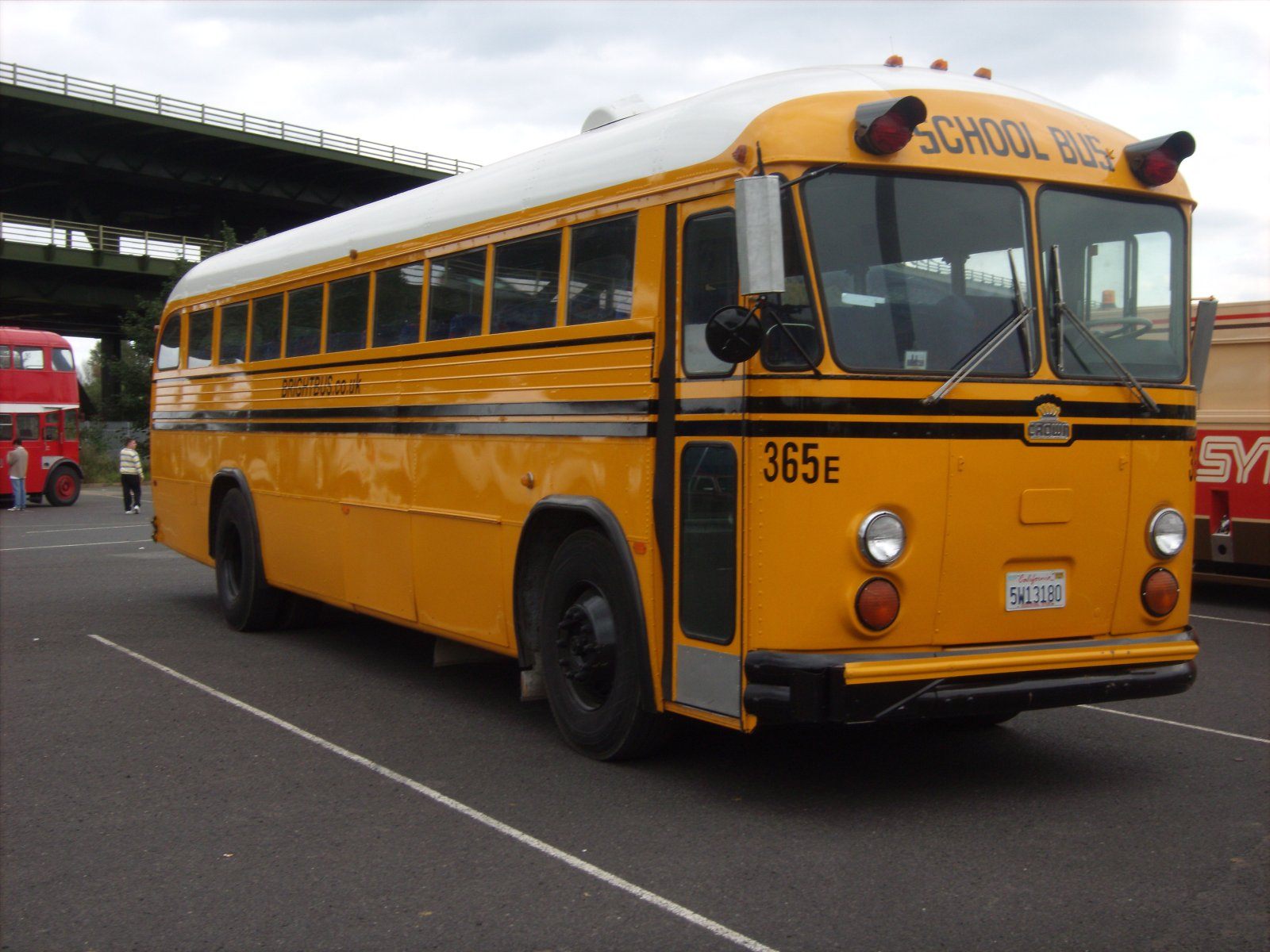
1977-1991 36' Crown Supercoach

1982 Crown-Ikarus 286 articulated bus

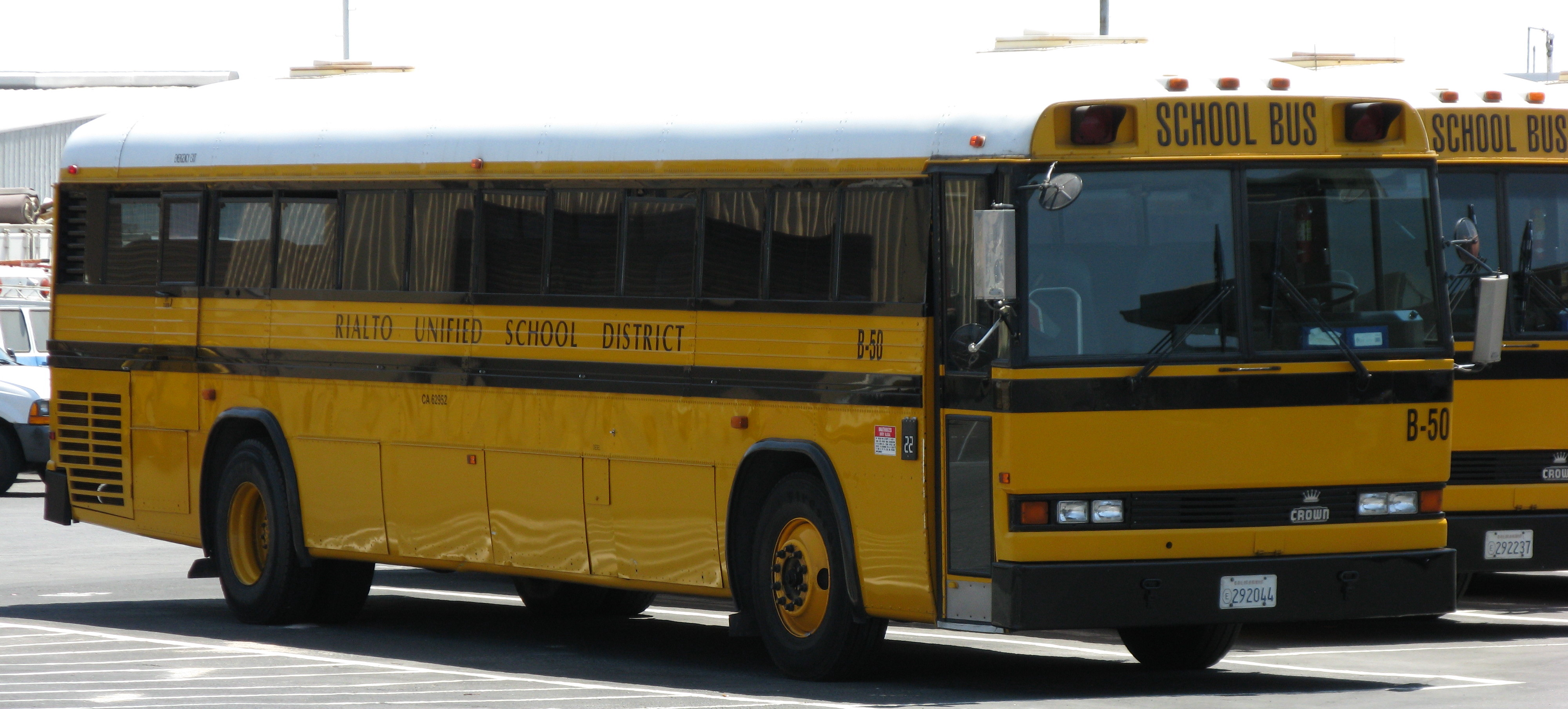
Crown Supercoach II

=== Buses ===
Crown Coach buses
Vehicle	Production Dates	Chassis	Notes
Crown School Buses	c. 1919–1932	Various (including Mack, Reo, Ford)	Crown built the first dual-rear wheel school bus (1927) Crown built its first all-metal school bus body in 1930.
Crown Metro/Metropolitan	1935–c.1937	Ford	Ford conventional-chassis bus
Crown Super Coach	1932–1947 (exc.WWII)	Various	First factory-produced forward control-school bus (1932) Mid-engine version (1937) Rear-engine version (1939) Produced as school bus and motorcoach
Crown Supercoach Crown Supercoach Series II Motorcoach/Tourcoach Crown Coach Highway/Intercity coaches	1948–1991	Crown Coach integral	Aluminum-body integral chassis bus, Midship and rear engine configurations Produced as both school bus and motorcoach First diesel-powered school bus (1955) First tandem-axle school bus (1956)
Crown Coach-sold buses (assembled by other manufacturers)
Ford Transit Bus	c.1945–1947	Ford rear-engine	Crown sold the Ford Transit Bus after World War II.
Ward/Ford Coachette	1961–1962	Ford P-van	The Coachette (bodied by Ward) was marketed by Crown from 1961-1962.
Crown-Ikarus 286	1980–1986	Ikarus 280 modified	The Crown-Ikarus 286 articulated transit bus was a joint venture between Crown Coach and Hungarian bus manufacturer Ikarus.
Other	1960s-1970s	See notes	Crown served as the first United States distributor of Prevost motorcoaches, from 1969 to 1983. During the 1960s and the 1970s, Crown served as the West Coast distributor of several school bus manufacturers, including Wayne Works, Blue Bird Body Company, and Thomas Built Buses.

=== Fire apparatus ===
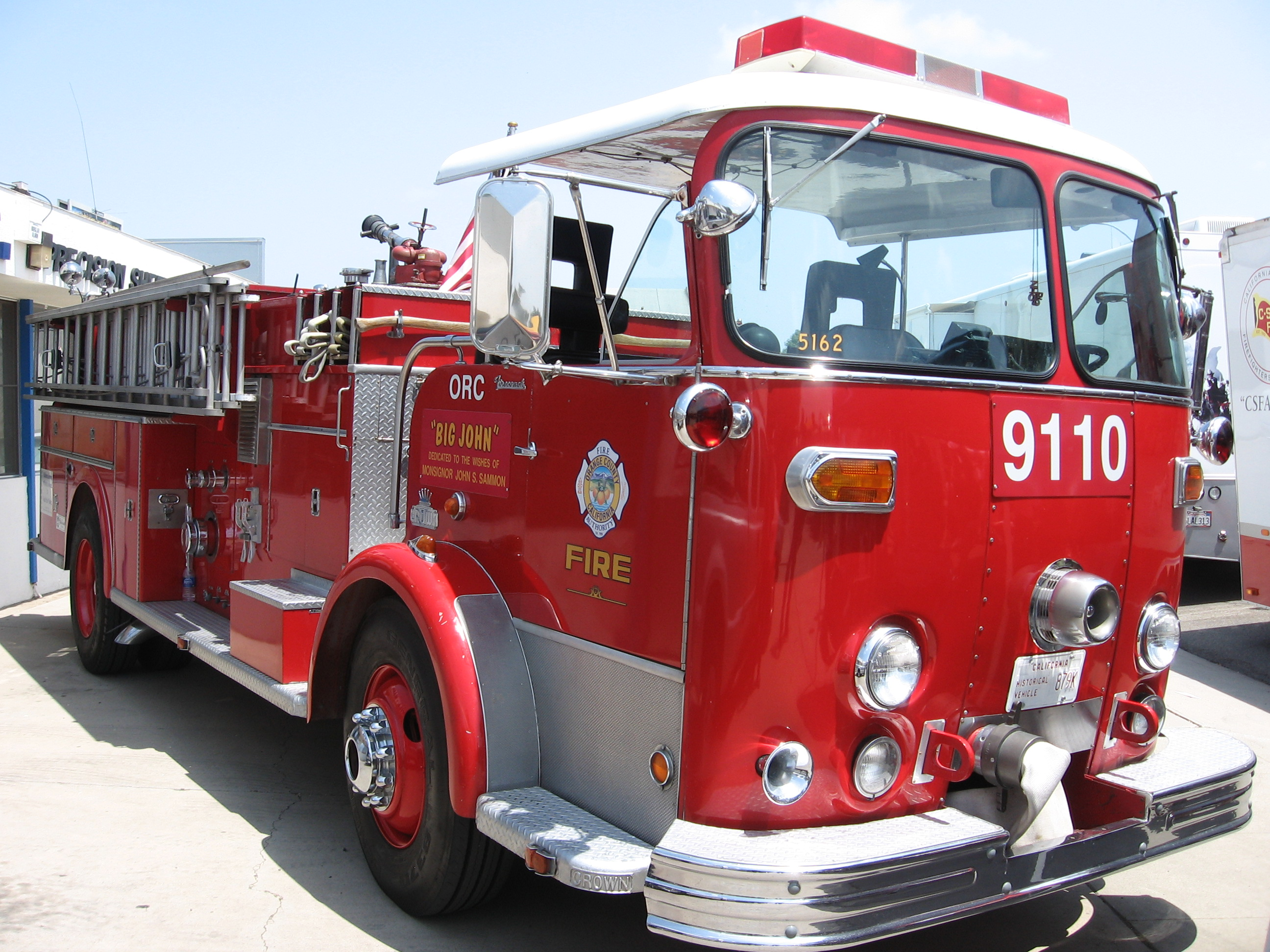
Retired Crown Firecoach

Crown Coach Fire Apparatus
Vehicle	Production Dates	Chassis	Notes
Crown Firecoach	1951–1982 1984–1985	Crown Coach	The mid-engine Crown Firecoach is derived from the underpinnings of the Crown Supercoach bus, using heavier-duty engines and powertrains. First produced as a fire engine, the Firecoach was also produced as water tenders, tiller and ladder trucks, and quints (TeleSquirts). Produced as open-air cabs, enclosed cabs (standard after 1965), and wide-cab (standard after 1979).
Various apparatus	1951–1985	Customer-provided chassis	Alongside the purpose-built Firecoach, Crown Coach also produced bodies on customer chassis to request.

=== Other vehicles ===
Other Crown Coach vehicles
Vehicle	Production Dates	Chassis	Notes
Crown truck cabs/bodies	1916–1918	Federal	
Crown B-3	1925–1933	N/A (see notes)	License-built version of Kinner Airster biplane
Mobile Command Unit Crown Coach HPO Bookmobile	1950s–c.1980	Crown Supercoach	Crown Supercoach with an enlarged body behind driver compartment, including raised roof and vertical sides.
Security Coaches	1950s–?	Crown Supercoach	Prisoner transport vehicle based on Crown Supercoach school bus 35-foot and 40-foot chassis; 42-64 passenger capacity
