= CamTran =

Bus service operator in Pennsylvania, US

- Founded: 1976
- Headquarters: 502 Maple Avenue; Johnstown, Pennsylvania
- Locale: Cambria County, Pennsylvania
- Service type: bus service, paratransit
- Routes: 26
- Stations: 2
- Fleet: 43
- Daily ridership: 2,400 (weekdays, Q4 2025)
- Annual ridership: 841,300 (2025)
- Website: camtranbus.com

CamTran, originally called the Cambria County Transit Authority operates mass transit bus service within Johnstown, Pennsylvania, Cambria County, and Windber, Pennsylvania, Somerset County, Pennsylvania. CamTran also operates the Johnstown Inclined Plane, taken over in 1983 from Westmont, Pennsylvania borough. The transit system began operation in 1976, from the remnants of the Johnstown Traction Company. Although the Cambria County Transit Authority (CCTA) began operation on July 20, 1976, service did not begin until December 1, 1976. In June 1999, CCTA became CamTran. In 2025, the system had a ridership of 841,300, or about 2,400 per weekday, as of the fourth quarter of 2025.

== Bus Services ==
CamTran is the urban division, and CamTran+ is the rural division.

=== CamTran Urban Service ===
CamTran operates 19 routes 20 on October 24, 2024, of its urban division. Most routes begin and end at the Transit Center on East Main Street in Downtown Johnstown. The transit center was constructed in 1983 and features a snack shop where passes can be purchased as well as public restrooms and a parking garage. Sunday bus service began in 2000 and bicycle racks were added to the urban division buses in 2006. In 2008, the Transit Center was renovated, including improvements to the air-handling system as well as electronic messaging boards. In 2011, seven new Gillig buses were added to CamTran's fleet.

=== CamTran+ Rural Service ===
CamTran+ started in 1978. Originally called Cambria County Rural Transportation (CART), it serves the northern half of Cambria County. In 2000, CART introduced Reserve-A-Ride, a service that passengers call in and reserve the bus for wherever they need to go. Reserve-A-Ride will pick up riders at their door, unlike conventional fixed-route services. This service is subsidized 85% by the Pennsylvania Lottery for persons 65 years or older. In 2002, CART became CamTran+. A new transit center was built in 2003 in Ebensburg to better serve CamTran+, and in 2003, the Ebensburg-Altoona Commuter route was added and the other CamTran+ routes were revised. CamTran+ began participating in the PennDOT Persons With Disabilities project in 2008, where on-demand service is provided to riders with disabilities. The rider pays 15% of the Reserve-A-Ride fare.

CamTran+ operates their rural blue and yellow smaller buses out their office in Ebensburg, PA and are located in the same building with the Cambria County Area Agency on Aging. Most transfers on CamTran+ routes are completed at the CamTran+ Transit Center.

== Fleet ==
CamTran operates a fleet of 51 buses on a rural and an urban fixed route system.

- 17 Ford
- 13 Gillig
- 8 Champion Bus Incorporated
- 5 Flxible
- 4 Chance RT-52
- 4 Freightliner

=== Active ===
Fleet Number(s)	Thumbnail	Build Date	Manufacturer	Model	Engine	Transmission	Notes
101-107		2011	Gillig	BRT 35' (G27B102N4)	Cummins ISL9
171-173		2016	Gillig	BRT CNG 35' (G31B102N4)	Cummins Westport ISL G
181-188		2017	Gillig	BRT CNG 35' (G31B102N4)	Cummins Westport L9N
190-191		2018	Gillig	BRT CNG 29' (G31E102N2)	Cummins Westport L9N
211-212		2021	Gillig	BRT CNG 29' (G31E102N2)	Cummins Westport L9N
213-214		2021	Gillig	BRT CNG 35' (G31B102N4)	Cummins Westport L9N
215		2015	Gillig	BRT CNG 29' (G27E102N2)	Cummins Westport ISL G		Assigned to Ebensburg
216-218		2021	Gillig	BRT CNG 35' (G31B102N4)	Cummins Westport L9N
219		2021	Gillig	BRT CNG 29' (G31E102?2)	Cummins Westport L9N
241-242		2024	Gillig	BRT CNG 35' (G31B102N4)	Cummins Westport L9N
243-244		2024	Gillig	BRT CNG 29' (G31E102?2)	Cummins Westport L9N
720-727		2007	Gillig	Low Floor 29' (C29B102N4)	Cummins ISL	Allison B300R	721, 723-725, and 727 retired.
900		2010	Gillig	Low Floor HEV 35' (G30B102N4)	Cummins ISL9	Allison EP40 hybrid system	Livery is a special wrap, noting hybrid technology.; Used on routes 10, 14, 15, 16 & 18 formerly 10, 14, 15, 16, 18 & 21
A81-A85		2013	Ford	E-Series Cutaway			Used on CamTran+ services.; Only A82, A85 active
C161-C163		2016	Ford	E-Series Cutaway			Used on CamTran+ services.; CNG Powered.
C164-C166		2016	Ford	E-Series Cutaway			Used on CamTran+ services.
C181		2024	Ford	E-Series Cutaway			Used on CamTran+ services.
C170-C179, C1710-C1711		2017	Ford	E-Series Cutaway			Used on CamTran+ services.
C202-C212		2024	Ford	E-Series Cutaway
C216-C218		2021	Ford	E-Series Cutaway			Used on CamTran+ services.

=== Retired ===
Fleet Number(s)	Thumbnail	Build Date	Manufacturer	Model	Engine	Transmission	Notes
101-107		1980	GMC	RTS-03 (T7H-603)	Detroit Diesel 8V71N	Allison V730
108-123		1994	OBI	Orion II (02.501)
124-125		2001	Chance Coach	AH-28	Cummins ISB 5.9		124 listed for auction on Publicsurplus.com in February 2020; 2000 model year; VIN: 1C9S2HFS4YW535183
201-208		1981	Grumman Flxible	870 (35096–8)	Detroit Diesel 8V71N	Allison V730
220-224		1993	Flxible	Metro "D" (30096-6VTA)	Detroit Diesel 6V92TA		Delivered in December 1993.; Some units may have been sold to Westmoreland County Transit Authority?
301-312		1983	Neoplan USA	AN440A	Detroit Diesel 6V92TA	Allison HT-747	301, 305, 309, 311 & 312 to RFTA as 321, 317, 319, 320 & 318.
401-402		1994	OBI	Orion II (02.501)
409		1993	Flxible	Metro "D" (30096-6VTA)	Detroit Diesel 6V92TA
411-428		1966-1967	GMC	TDH-3501	GMC Toro-Flow		411-418 were built in 1966. 419-428 were built in 1967.; Assigned serial numbers 0647-0654 and 0939–0948.; Assumed transferred from Johnstown Traction Company in 1976.
429-430		1969	GMC	TDH-3301	GMC Toro-Flow II DH478		Serial numbers 0070–0071.; Assumed transferred from Johnstown Traction Company in 1976.
431-432		1972-1973	GMC	TDH-3302N	GMC 478 Toro-Flow II		Serial numbers 0040–0041.; Assumed transferred from Johnstown Traction Company in 1976.
433-434		1973	GMC	TDH-3302N	GMC 478 Toro-Flow II		Serial numbers 0178–0179.; Assumed transferred from Johnstown Traction Company in 1976.
501-511		8/1999	Gillig	Low Floor 35' (G22B102N4)	Detroit Diesel Series 40
512-513		4/2000	Gillig	Low Floor 35' (G22B102N4)	Detroit Diesel Series 40
515-518		2005	Gillig	Phantom 35' (C29B102N4)	Cummins ISL
719		2007	Gillig	Phantom 30' (C29A102N4)	Cummins ISL	Voith D864.5
728-729		2008	Gillig	Low Floor 29' (G29E102N2)	Cummins ISL	Allison B400R
801-802		2008	Gillig	Low Floor 29' (G27E102N2)	Cummins ISL
9104, 9108, 9109		1991	Gillig	Phantom 35'			Ex-?, acquired in 2006; Unknown amount of units.; 9104, 9108, 9109 were auctioned off in August 2007.
(2 buses)		1991	Flxible	Metro "B" (35???-??)			Ex-?, acquired in 2006; 35 ft. long
(2 buses)		2000	Chance	RT-52
A76-A80		2012	Ford	E-Series Cutaway			Used on CamTran+ services.
C26-C27		2010	Ford	E-Series Cutaway			Used on CamTran+ services.
C28-C29		2012	Ford	E-Series Cutaway			Used on CamTran+ services.
C30-C31		2008	Ford	E-Series Cutaway			Used on CamTran+ services.

== Service Routes ==
=== Urban routes ===
- 6-Conemaugh/Franklin (discontinued July 2011 merged into *30 Ebensburg/Johnstown & coming back October 8, 2024)
- 7-Coopersdale
- 8-Daisytown (discontinued July 2011 & coming back October 8th 2024)
- 8 (2nd)-Central City (coming October 24, 2024)
- 9-Richland Town Centre
- 10-Dale/Solomon/Oakland
- 11-Galleria/Scalp Ave
- 12-Hystone/Westwood
- 13-Arbutus/Belmont
- 14-Moxham/Horner Street
- 15-Oakhurst
- 16-Prospect
- 17-Scalp Avenue/Galleria
- 18-Downtown Shuttle
- 19-Southmont/Westwood/Laurelwood
- 20-Westmont/Brownstown
- 21-Windber
- 22, 23, 24, 25, 26, 27, 28 & 29 Tripper AM (Coming October 17, 2024)
- 38, 39, 40, 41, 42, 43, 44 & 45 Tripper PM (Coming October 17, 2024)

=== Rural routes ===
- 30-Ebensburg to Johnstown
- 31-Patton to Ebensburg
- 32-Northern Cambria Loop
- 33-Ebensburg/Cresson/Portage
- 34-Mainline Shopper
- 35-Patton/Ebensburg Saturday Shopper
- 36-Ebensburg to Altoona

== Passes/GFI Machines ==
CamTran operates bus fare machines manufactured by GFI. According to CamTran in a Summer 2006 Newsletter called camrecorder, these GFI machines were introduced to CamTran in March 1992. They take bus tokens, dollar bills, change, and bus passes. These machines cannot give cash change back, they only give back "change cards" where customers receive a card that can only be used on CamTran and CamTran+ buses. Customers never get cash back from a CamTran bus.

CamTran+ does not use the GFI machines. Customers have to show their passes to the driver and enter the exact change into the fare box, because even on a change card, it is not possible to get change. CamTran passes can be used on CamTran+ buses, but customers must pay the difference, since the rural fares are more than the urban fares.

CamTran+ passes can be used on CamTran (urban) buses, since the rural passes pay more fare than the urban passes.
