= Johnstown Traction Company =

Former transit system in Johnstown, Pennsylvania

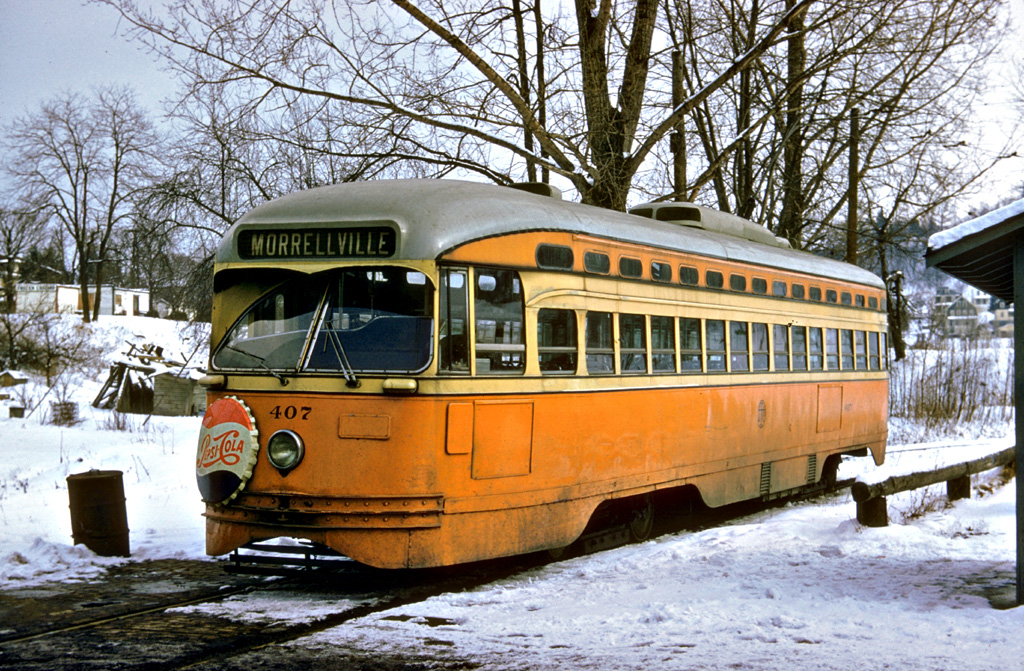
Johnstown Traction Company PCC streetcar PCC 407 in the 1950s

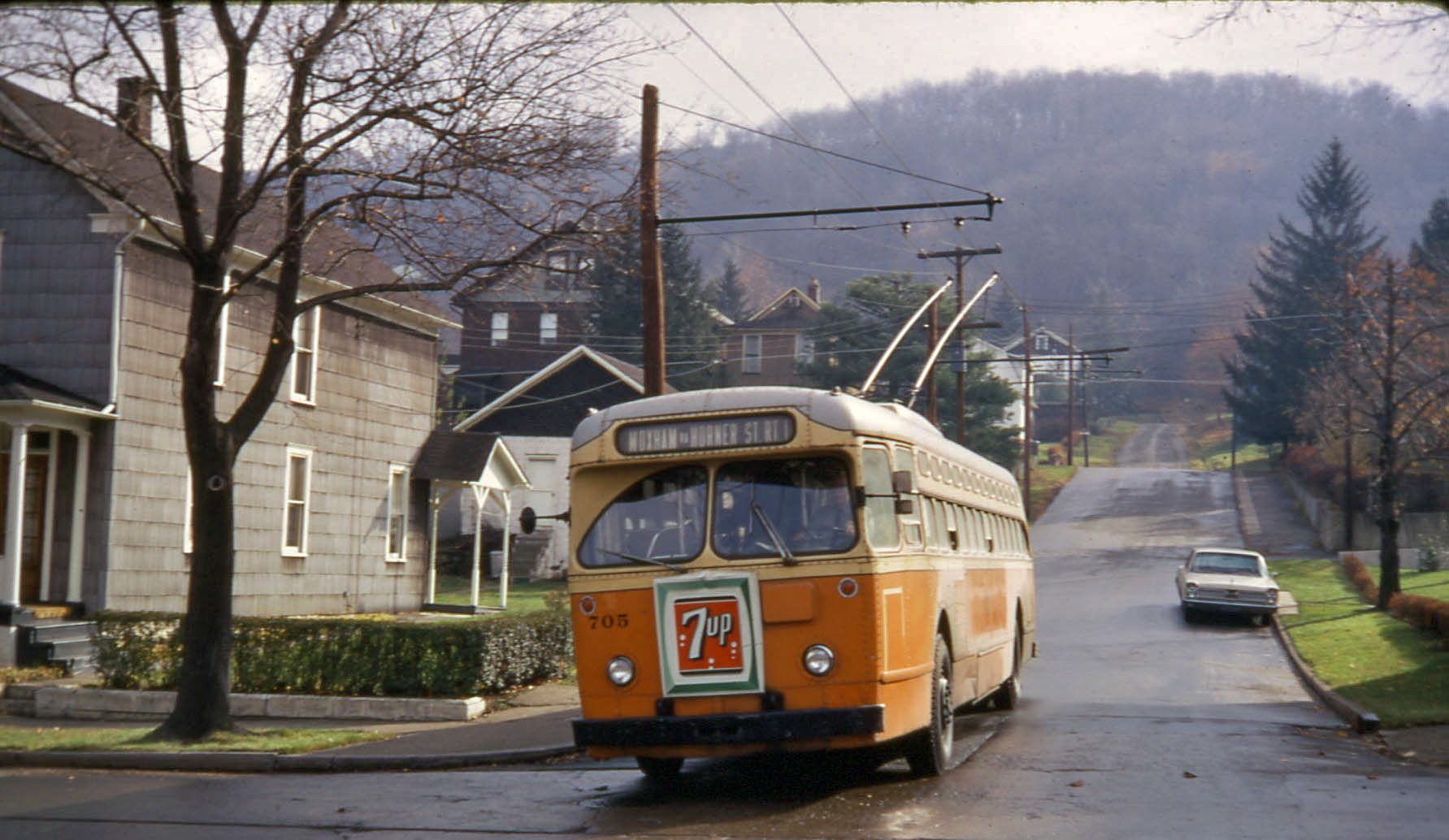
JTC trolley bus 705 on the final day of trolley bus service in Johnstown, November 11, 1967.

Johnstown Traction Company (JTC) was a public transit system in Johnstown, Pennsylvania, United States. For most of its existence it was primarily a street-railway system, but in later years also operated rubber-tired vehicles. JTC operated trolley (tram) service in Johnstown from February 23, 1910 to June 11, 1960. Johnstown was one of the last small cities to abandon trolley service in the United States. It was also the smallest city to acquire a fleet of PCC cars and acquired trackless trolleys at a late date compared to larger transit properties. Many of the 1920s-era cars went directly to museums; however, none of the 17 PCC streetcars were saved. Efforts to sell the 16 then-surviving PCC cars intact were unsuccessful, and in 1962 they were scrapped, but many of their components were salvaged and sold to the Brussels, Belgium tram system, reused in the last series of single PCC trams (7156–7171), which ran from 1970 until February 2010.

JTC's system also included electric trolley buses, the first route of which was opened on November 20, 1951. Trolley bus service continued until 1967, the last day of electric service being November 11, 1967. The transit system then used only motor buses, but retained the name Johnstown Traction Company (in which "traction" is a reference to electric vehicle propulsion). In 1976, the private JTC would become the CamTran public transit system.

== Surviving JTC cars ==
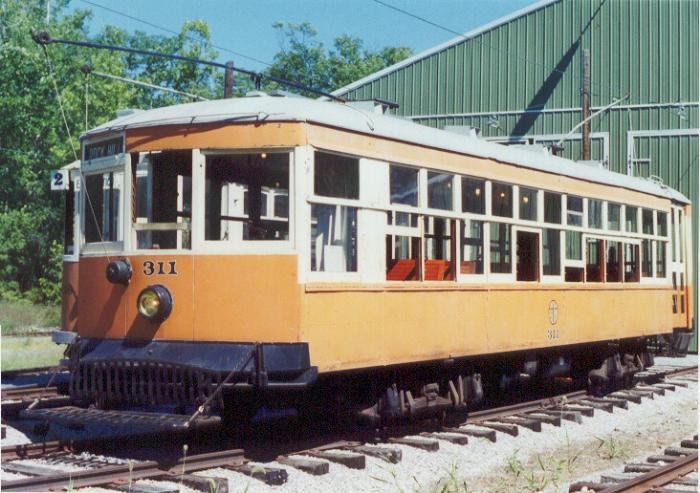
Johnstown Traction 311, shown at the Rockhill Trolley Museum in 2002.

- 350 Pennsylvania Trolley Museum
- 351 Market Street Railway (San Francisco)
- 311, 355 Rockhill Trolley Museum
- 356, 357 Shore Line Trolley Museum
- 358 originally Stone Mountain, Georgia, then Trolley Museum of New York
- 362 Johnstown Area Heritage Association

== See also ==
- Streetcars in Kenosha, Wisconsin – An ex-Toronto PCC car, in service on a heritage streetcar system here, wears the JTC paint scheme in tribute to Johnstown's streetcar system, which used similar PCC cars
