= Flxible New Look bus =

American passenger transit bus

Flxible New Look
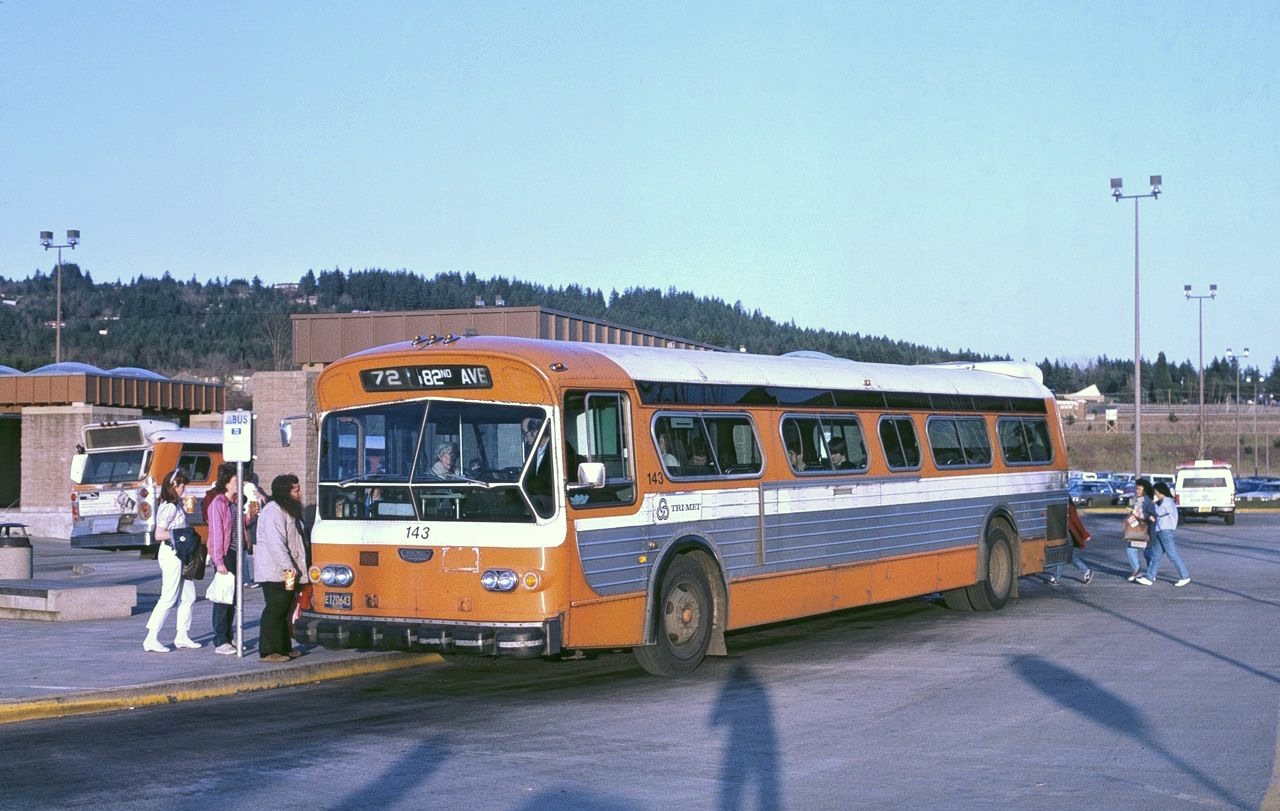
- A Flxible New Look in service for Tri-Met in Portland, Oregon, in 1985

Overview
- Manufacturer: Flxible
- Production: 1960–1978
- Assembly: Loudonville, Ohio (1959–1974); Delaware, Ohio (1974–1978); Evergreen, Alabama (1963–1966)

Body and chassis
- Class: Transit bus

Powertrain
- Engine: Detroit Diesel and Cummins, see below
- Transmission: Allison VS or VH, 2- or 3-speed

Dimensions
- Wheelbase: 176 in (4.47 m), 176 in (4.47 m), 201 in (5.11 m), or 285 in (7.24 m)
- Length: 31 ft (9.4 m), 33 ft (10.1 m), 35 ft (10.7 m), or 40 ft (12.19 m)
- Width: 96 in (2.44 m) or 102 in (2.59 m)
- Height: 120 in (3.05 m)

Chronology
- Predecessor: Flxible Twin transit bus
- Successor: Grumman 870/Flxible Metro

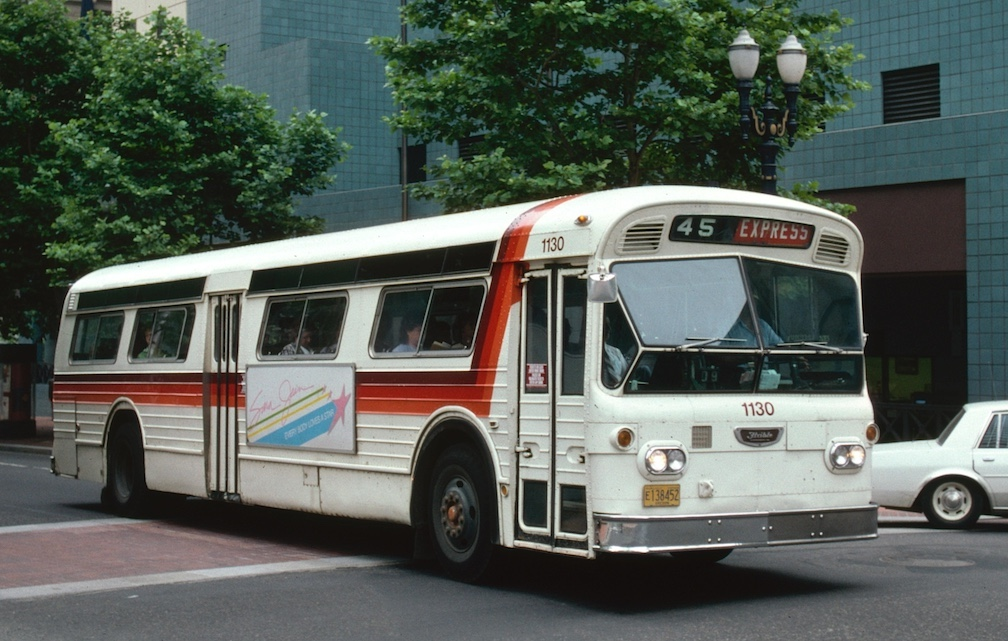
Until 1963, the first-generation Flxible New Looks had side windows with sharper corners. This is an ex-Denver bus in Portland in 1984.

The Flxible New Look bus is a transit bus introduced in 1959 by the Flxible Company, and produced from 1960 until 1978, when the New Look was replaced by the "870" Advanced Design Bus. Over its 17-year production run 13,121 Flxible New Look buses were manufactured.

== Design ==
The Flxible New Look bus shares many design features with the GM New Look bus that was introduced in 1959, however the Flxible New look bus was somewhat more rugged and solid. Both buses initially featured large 6-piece "fishbowl" windshields, as well as forward-slanting side windows, fluted aluminum siding, and slide/glide front passenger doors. Both buses were also equipped with the same Detroit Diesel 6V-71 (6-cylinder) / 8V-71 (8-cylinder) diesel engine (however, 150 propane-fueled Flxible New Looks were built for the Chicago Transit Authority in the mid-1960s, Detroit Diesel 4-71 (4-cylinder) diesel engines were available for some models in the mid-1960s, and Cummins 165-285 and 903 8-cylinder diesel engines were available until 1973 as an alternative to the Detroit Diesel engines).

Originally, the Flxible New Look was only available in lengths of 35 or 40 feet (10.7 or 12.2 m) and widths of 96 or 102 inches (2.44 or 2.59 m), however 31-and-33-foot (9.4 and 10.1 m) models later became available. Until 1963, these buses carried both the Flxible and the Twin nameplates, with the Twin name located in a small oval beneath the Flxible shield on the front of the buses (Twin Coach had been a manufacturer of transit buses as early as 1927 and sold its transit bus product line to Flxible in 1953). In 1964 and 1965 Flxible produced a suburban model meant for longer distance highway routes, and these buses were equipped with all forward-facing high-backed seats and overhead luggage racks, but lacked a rear exit door and standee windows. Air conditioning was an available option on all models, and in most cases was identifiable by a bulge above the rear window where the roof-mounted condenser and cooling fan were located (some buses were built with under-floor air conditioning). Air-ride suspension was standard on all models.

== Manufacture ==
At the start of production all New Looks were built at the Flxible factory in Loudonville, Ohio, and a majority of the New Looks continued to be built here during the life of the New Look's production run.

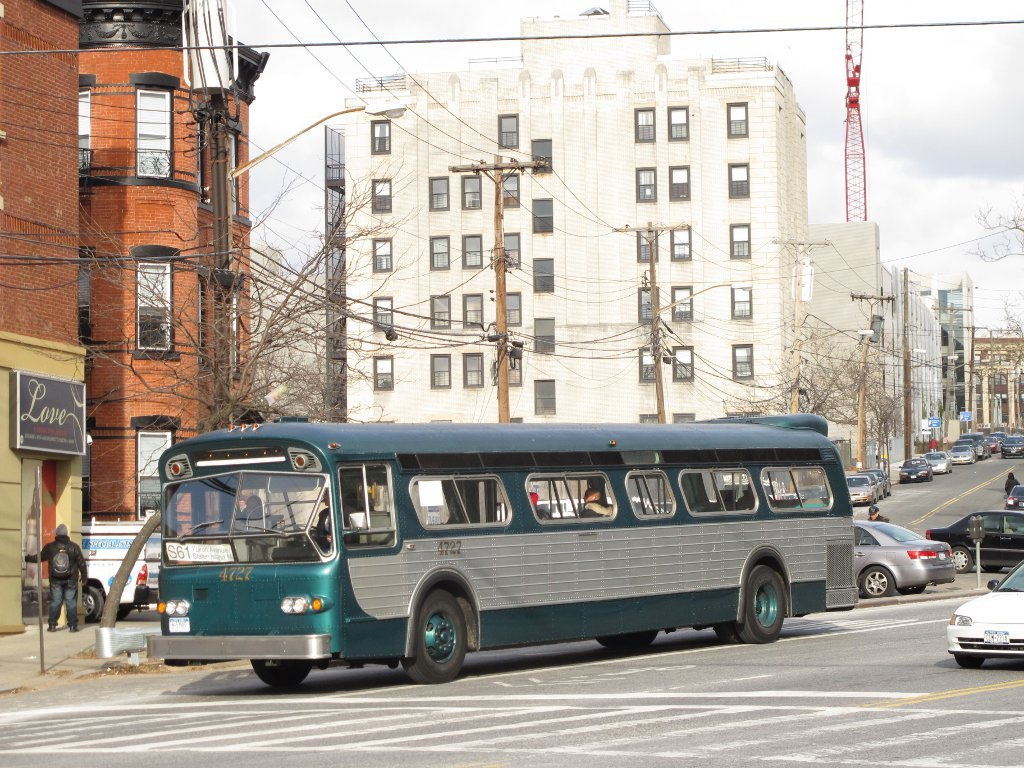
A second-generation Flxible New Look (111CC-D5-1), preserved as a museum bus in Staten Island, New York.

In 1963, Flxible started building a line of shorter buses at the former Southern Coach factory in Evergreen, Alabama. These buses came in lengths of 31 feet (9.4 m), 33 feet (10.1 m) and 35 feet (10.7 m), and were all 96 inches (2.44 m) wide. The buses built in Evergreen were generally identical in appearance to those built in Loudonville, except that the Evergreen buses had only two headlights, while the Loudonville buses had four. The Evergreen buses were available with either the 4-71 (4-cylinder) or 6V-71 (6-cylinder) Detroit Diesel engine. Production in Evergreen stopped in 1966.

In 1965, Flxible licensed their New Look design to Canadair Ltd., an aircraft manufacturer in Ville St-Laurent, Quebec. All were 40 feet (12.2 m) long and 102 inches (2.59 m) wide, and carried both the Flxible and Canadair nameplates. The intent of this licensing venture was to enter the Canadian bus market, however production stopped in 1966 after just one order for Montreal (50 buses for Montreal Transportation Commission).

In 1970, Flxible was purchased by Rohr Industries, and in 1974 a new factory and corporate headquarters were opened in Delaware, Ohio. Final assembly of all New Looks was moved to Delaware, with the Loudonville factory still being used for the manufacture of sub-assemblies and parts. Also in 1974, a 31-foot-long (9.4 m), 96-inch-wide (2.4 m) model became available and was built in Loudonville/Delaware. It was only available with the 6V-71 (6-cylinder) Detroit Diesel engine.

== Competition with General Motors ==
During the 1960s, Flxible was the only large-production competitor to General Motors in the American transit bus market, although it was still a distant second with GM building more than twice as many buses. The Flxible New Look bus bears a close resemblance to the GM New Look bus with forward slanting side windows, but no opera windows by the boarding door and driver side window, and in fact Flxible New Looks were commonly equipped with GM engines. This was due largely to the consent decree resulting from the 1956 anti-trust case United States v. General Motors Corp. which mandated that GM's bus components, engines, and transmissions be made available for sale to other manufacturers, free of royalties. However, it should also be noted that prior to the consent decree a small number of earlier model (pre-New Look) Flxible buses were built with GM engines, at the same time that GM vice president Charles F. Kettering was also chairman of the board at Flxible. It has been suggested that prior to the consent decree GM may have made its diesel engines available to Flxible in order to reduce the criticisms of GM's business practices that some felt were monopolistic.

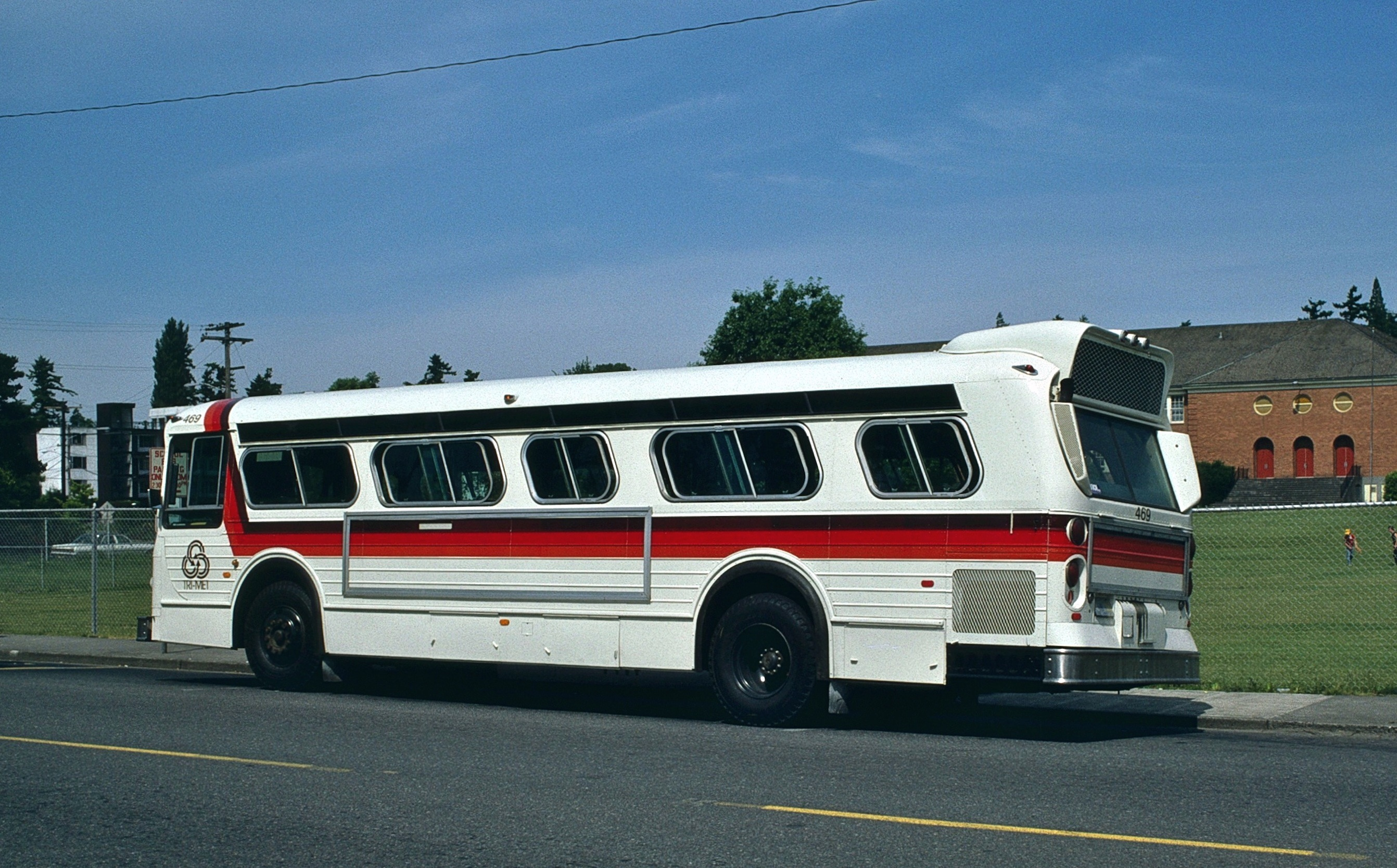
Left side and rear of a 1971-built 35-foot bus equipped with air-conditioning

Another area of competition between the two manufacturers, but where Flxible had an advantage, was the market for 35-foot (10.7 m) long buses equipped with 8-cylinder diesel engines. In 1966 GM began offering its Detroit Diesel 8V-71 8-cylinder diesel engine on its 40-foot (12.2 m) New Look transit buses; however GM would not equip its 35-foot (10.7 m) models with anything larger than the 6V-71 6-cylinder diesel engine. In response to the desire by some transit agencies for a shorter bus with a larger engine (mainly for hilly routes, freeway driving, or to provide extra power for air conditioning equipped buses), Flxible offered its 35-foot (10.7 m) New Look with the Detroit Diesel 8V-71, the Cummins 165-285, and the Cummins 903 8-cylinder diesel engines.

== Model designations ==
Several different variations of model designations were used for Flxible New Look buses, with changes being made over time and between the various manufacturing locations. The letters and numbers gave a basic description of the type of bus as follows:

First generation (1959-1970)^{1}
Width	Fuel	Engine	Length	Engine mount	Configuration	Luggage	Air conditioning
F2 = 102 in (2.59 m); F = 96 in (2.44 m)	D = Diesel; P = Propane	47 = Detroit Diesel 4-71; 6V = Detroit Diesel 6V71; 6VT = Detroit Diesel 6V71: T-drive transmission 6V5 = Detroit Diesel 6V71: built in Evergreen; V8C = Cummins 165-285: Omitted for propane-fueled buses	-31 = 31 ft (9.4 m)^{2} -33 = 33 ft (10.1 m)^{2} -35 = 35 ft (10.7 m)^{2} -40 = 40 ft (12.2 m)	1 = Transverse mount	-1 = Transit -7 = Suburban^{2}	-UL = Under-floor luggage storage^{2}: Omitted for buses without this feature	-AC = Air conditioning: Omitted for buses without air conditioning
First generation - Canadair (1963-1967)
Designation: CL-218; Similar to the F2D6V-401-1 model (40 feet (12.2 m) long × 102 inches (2.59 m) wide), but with McKay gate exits and no air conditioning.; 50 buses built for the Montreal Transportation Commission (5051 to 5100). One demonstrator also sent to the RATP (Paris, France) to test but it almost never ran because the bus was too wide for the Parisian streets. 5097 sent to Ottawa as demo 1965.
Second generation (1967-1970)
Build location		Type	Length	Width	Engine		Air conditioning
1 = Loudonville, Ohio; 4 = Evergreen, Alabama^{3}		11 = Transit with a transversely mounted engine.	C = 40 ft D = 35 ft G = 33 ft H = 31 ft	C = 102 in D = 96 in	-C1 = Cummins 165-285 -C3 = Cummins 903 -D1 = Detroit Diesel 4-71 -D4 = Detroit Diesel 6V71 -D5 = Detroit Diesel 6V71: V-drive transmission -D6 = Detroit Diesel 8V71		-1: Air conditioning: Omitted for buses without air conditioning
Third generation (1970-1978)
Nominal seating capacity		Width	Engine			Air conditioning	
35 = 31 ft 45 = 35 ft 53 = 40 ft		096 = 96 in 102 = 102 in	-6 = Detroit Diesel 6V71 -8 = Detroit Diesel 8V71			-0 = No air conditioning -1 = Air conditioning	
Notes: 1. 21 buses were built between 1963 and 1966 in Evergreen, Alabama with only two headlights instead of four for buses built in Ohio.; 2. Buses with this designation were available only in a 96-inch (2.4 m) wide version.; 3. In 1967, 15 buses built in Loudonville had model designations beginning with 4 because they used the Evergreen design of two headlights.

- Two typical bus model designations of first-generation Flxible New Looks are F2D6V-401-1 and FD6V-401-7-UL-AC.
- Two typical bus model designations of second-generation Flxible New Looks are 111CC-C3-1 and 111DD-D5-1.
- Two typical bus model designations of third-generation Flxible New Looks are 45096-6-0 and 53102-8-1.

== See also ==
- GM New Look bus – competing bus built by General Motors
- Flxible Metro – originally the Grumman 870, the succeeding model
- Flyer Industries D700A – bus shell design similar to the Flxible New Looks and marketed mostly in Canada
- List of buses
