= Flxible =

American manufacturer of coaches and buses from 1913 to 1996

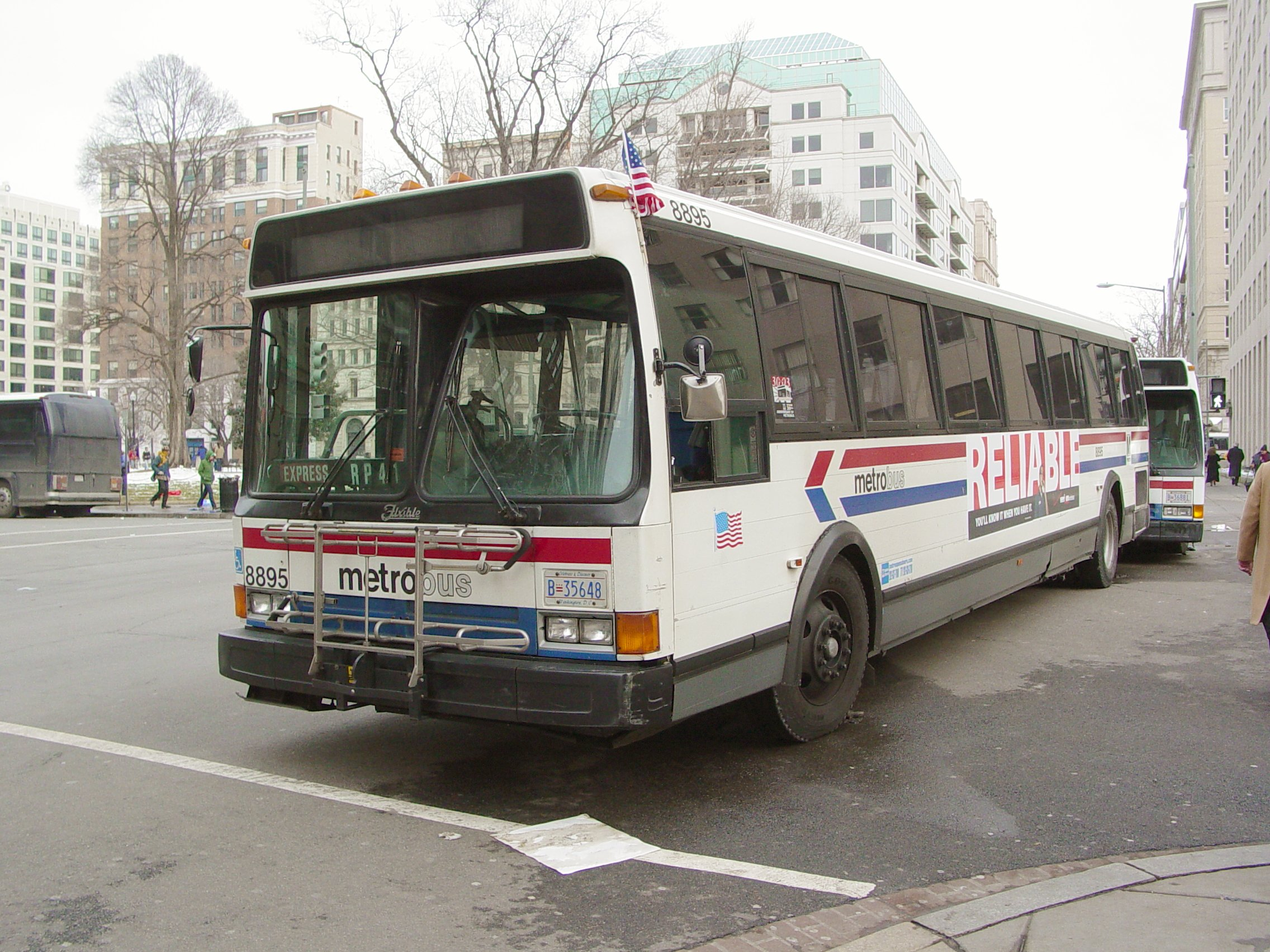
A 1987 Flxible Metro-A, owned by WMATA Metrobus, parked in Washington, D.C.

The Flxible Co. (pronounced "flexible") was an American manufacturer of motorcycle sidecars, funeral cars, ambulances, intercity coaches and transit buses, based in Loudonville, Ohio. It was founded in 1913 and closed in 1996. The company's production transitioned from highway coaches and other products to transit buses over the period 1953–1970, and during the years that followed, Flxible was one of the largest transit-bus manufacturers in North America.

== History ==
In 1913, Hugo H. Young and Carl F. Dudte founded the Flexible Side Car Company in Mansfield, Ohio, to manufacture motorcycle sidecars with a flexible mounting to the motorcycle that was designed by Young while he owned and operated a Harley-Davidson dealership. The flexible mounting allowed the sidecar to lean on corners along with the motorcycle. With growing demand and financial assistance (and leadership) from Charles F. Kettering, a larger plant was opened in Loudonville, Ohio. In 1919, the company dropped the first "E" in "flexible" and changed its name to The Flxible Company so the name could be trademarked.

After low-priced automobiles became available in the 1920s, the market for motorcycle sidecars dropped off and Flxible turned to other markets. Their first bus was a 12-passenger Studebaker-chassis sedan, which was delivered to E.L. Harter in 1924. Harter operated a passenger line that ran from Ashland, Ohio to Mt. Vernon, Ohio. Herter purchased a second bus in April of 1925. Flxible also built Hearses and ambulances, primarily based on Buick chassis. Ambulance and hearse production ceased in 1964.

=== Charles Kettering and General Motors ===
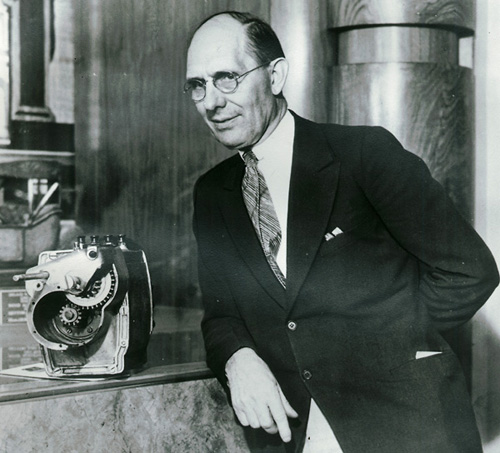
Charles F. Kettering

Charles Kettering, a Loudonville, Ohio native and vice president of General Motors, was closely associated with Flxible for almost the entire first half of the company's existence. In 1914, Flxible was incorporated with the help of Kettering, who then became president of the company and joined the board of directors. Kettering provided significant funding for the company in its early years, particularly after 1916, when he sold his firm, the Dayton Engineering Laboratories Company (Delco), to GM for $2.5 million. Kettering continued to serve as president of Flxible, until he became chairman of the board in 1940, a position he held until his death in 1958.

After selling Delco to GM in 1916, Kettering organized and ran a research laboratory at GM and, by the 1950s, held the position of vice president at GM. As a result of Kettering's close relationship with both GM and Flxible, many GM parts were used in the production of Flxible vehicles, particularly prior to GM's 1943 purchase of Yellow Coach, a competing bus manufacturer, of which GM had been a majority owner since 1925. For example, most Flxible ambulances, hearses and buses, from the mid-1920s to the early 1940s, were built on Buick chassis, and Flxible's "Airway" model buses of the mid-1930s were built on a Chevrolet chassis.

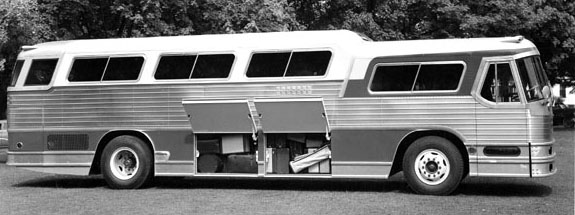
1955 Flxible VistaLiner (VL100)

In 1958, as a result of the consent decree from the 1956 anti-trust case, United States v. General Motors Corp., GM was mandated to sell their bus components, engines, and transmissions to other manufacturers, free of royalties. However, in the early 1950s and prior to the consent decree, Flxible built a small number of buses with GM diesel engines while Kettering still served on the board. It has been postulated that GM may have made its diesel engines available to Flxible to reduce the criticisms of GM's business practices that some felt were monopolistic. The same has been said about GM's decision in the 1960s and 1970s not to produce a 35 ft (11 m) "New Look" transit bus with an 8-cylinder engine. However, it is also possible that GM chose not to enter that market because the potential sales did not warrant the added costs of engineering and production. Another result of the consent decree, which was not settled in its entirety until 1965, was that GM was barred from having any of its officers or directors serve as an officer or director for any other bus manufacturing company. That provision would have applied to Kettering, had he not died in 1958.

=== Bus manufacturing ===
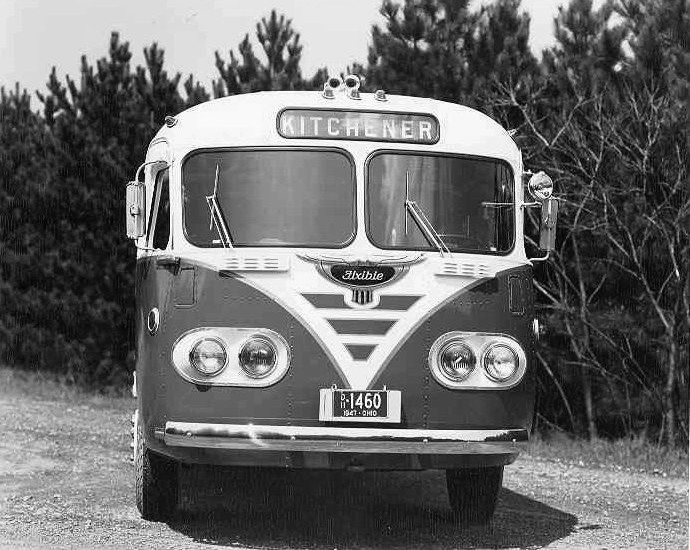
1947 Flxible Clipper highway coach

In 1953, Flxible absorbed the bus-manufacturing portion of the Fageol Twin Coach Company, and accepted its first order for transit buses from the Chicago Transit Authority. In 1964, Flxible purchased Southern Coach Manufacturing Co. of Evergreen, Alabama, and built small transit buses at the former Southern Coach factory until 1976. Flxible was purchased by Rohr Industries in 1970, and a new factory and corporate headquarters were built in Delaware, Ohio, in 1974, with the original factory in Loudonville, Ohio, being used to manufacture parts and sub-assemblies. Flxible was sold to Grumman Corporation in 1978 and became known as Grumman Flxible. The name reverted to Flxible when Grumman sold the company in 1983 to General Automotive Corporation. In 1996, Flxible declared bankruptcy and its assets were auctioned. The last Flxible vehicles were produced in 1995.

=== 870 "A" frame problems ===
In the mid-1980s, several Grumman 870 buses operated by the New York City Transit Authority (NYCTA) developed cracks in their A-shaped underframes. This prompted NYCTA President David Gunn to remove the entire fleet from service. Soon, several other companies reported cracked 870 "A" frames. However, the frame issues primarily affected NYCTA 870s and not the 870s owned by the franchisees of the New York City Department of Transportation, which were the first buses built with the problem rectified the following year. NYCTA attempted to get the remainder of its pending order for new buses transferred to GM, but was barred from doing so unless they could prove that the 870s were flawed and unsafe. The buses were eventually returned to Flxible, and were rebuilt and resold to Queen City Metro and New Jersey Transit. Grumman blamed the problems with the NYCTA 870s on NYCTA's poor maintenance practices at the time, despite the fact that transit operations in Chicago, Connecticut, Houston, Los Angeles and Orange County, California had also reported problems with their 870s. Regardless, NYCTA ordered fifty Metros in 1995, but Flxible closed its doors before the order was produced, and NYCTA obtained the remaining new buses from Orion instead.

=== Last transit buses in service ===
By the mid-2010s, very few transit systems were still operating any Flxible buses. Portland, Oregon's TriMet retired its last Flxible buses in May 2015, after which the only known continued use of Flxible buses in service was by Charleston Area Regional Transportation Authority (CARTA) in Charleston, South Carolina, and by Metro Transit in Omaha, Nebraska. However, Omaha ordered replacement buses in summer 2018 and retired its last Flxible buses before the end of that year. Subsequently, CARTA retired its last Flxible buses in October 2019.

== Engineering program ==
Flxible implemented a CAD program, CATIA, in the late 1990s to support production design. They were one of the first customers of IBM/Dassault.

== Production outside the United States ==
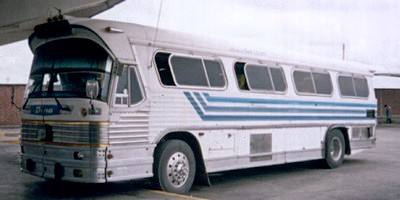
Mexican-made DINA Flxliner bus, in second-class service, berthed in the Silao, Guanajuato central terminal, 2006.

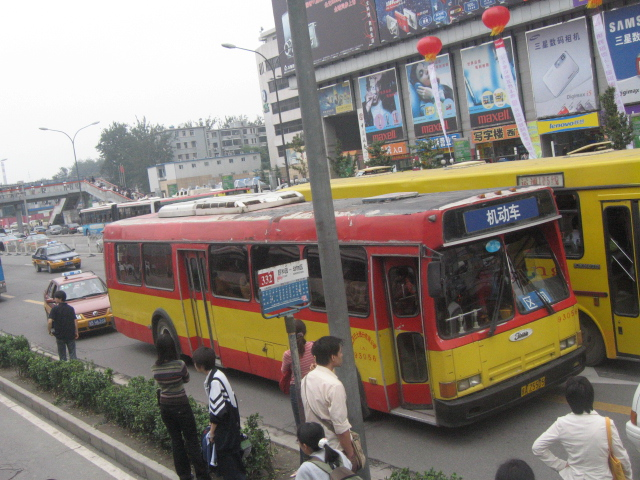
A Changjiang CFC6110GD bus in Beijing, China, showing the similarity to the Flxible Metro, and wearing a Flxible logo on the front.

Flxible's intercity buses were popular in Mexico and in Latin American countries. However, high import duties into these countries limited sales. In the early 1960s, Flxible began licensing a producer in Mexico, DINA S.A. (Diesel Nacional), to manufacture Flxible-designed intercity coaches, and this continued until the late 1980s. In 1965 and 1966, Flxible also licensed its "New Look" transit bus design to Canadair Ltd., an aircraft manufacturer in Ville St-Laurent, Quebec.

In 1994, Flxible's parent company, General Automotive Corporation, and three other American companies – Roger Penske, Mark IV Industries, and Carrier – entered into a joint venture with Changzhou Changjiang Bus, a Chinese manufacturer located in Changzhou, Jiangsu province, to produce buses based on the Flxible Metro design and with the Flxible name. The resulting company, China Flxible Auto Corporation, manufactured buses in a variety of lengths, from 8 m (26 ft 3 in) to 11 m (36 ft 1 in). These buses, which include both front- and rear-engine designs, and share only their general exterior appearance with the American-built Flxibles, were sold to many transit operators in major Chinese cities, including Beijing and Shanghai. A trolleybus version was manufactured for only one operator, the Hangzhou trolleybus system, which bought 77 units between the late 1990s and 2001. For these vehicles, Changzhou Changjiang supplied the chassis and Metro-style bodies to the Hangzhou Changjiang Bus Company (in Hangzhou), and that company equipped them as trolleybuses.

== Products ==
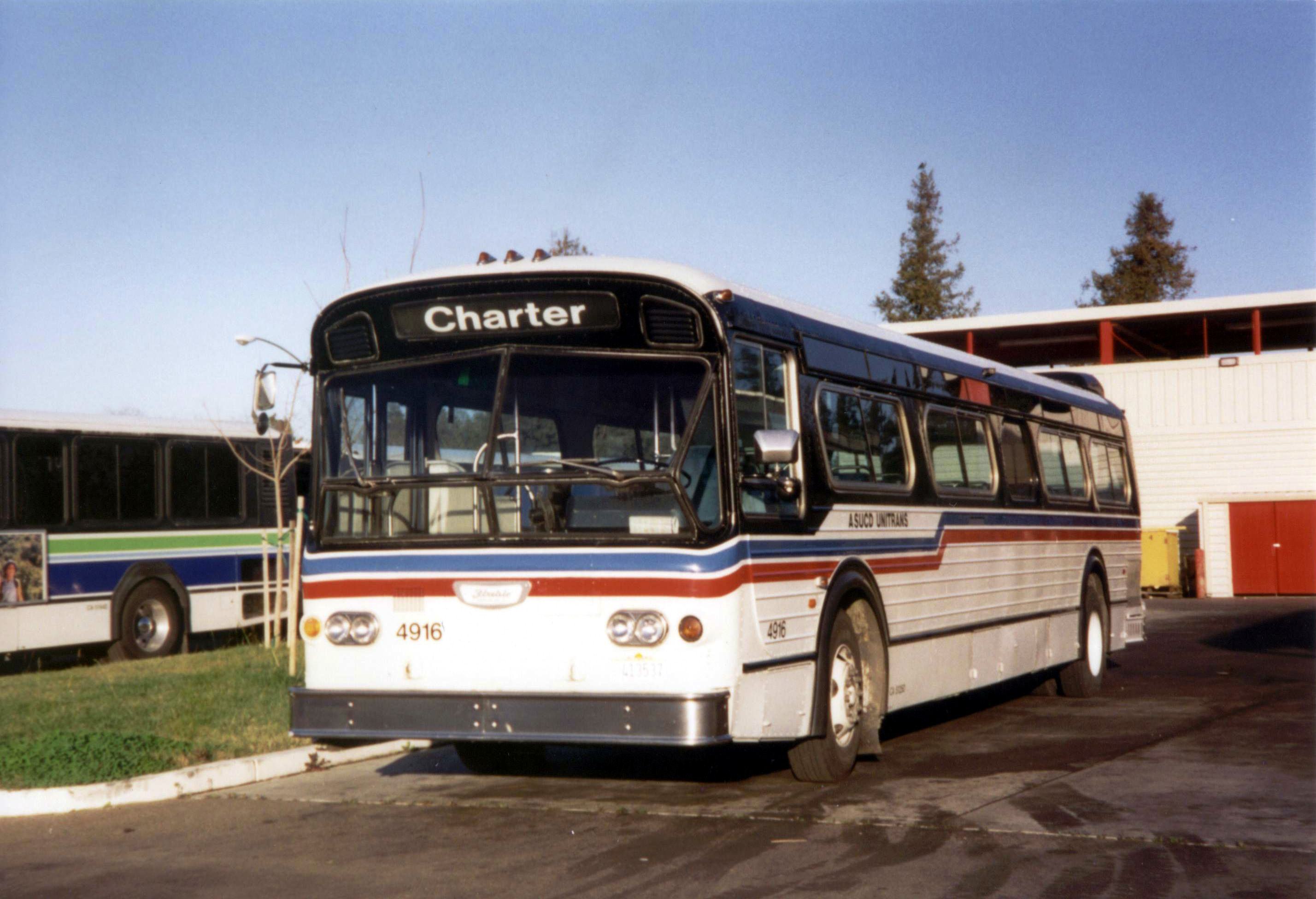
A Unitrans Flxible New Look

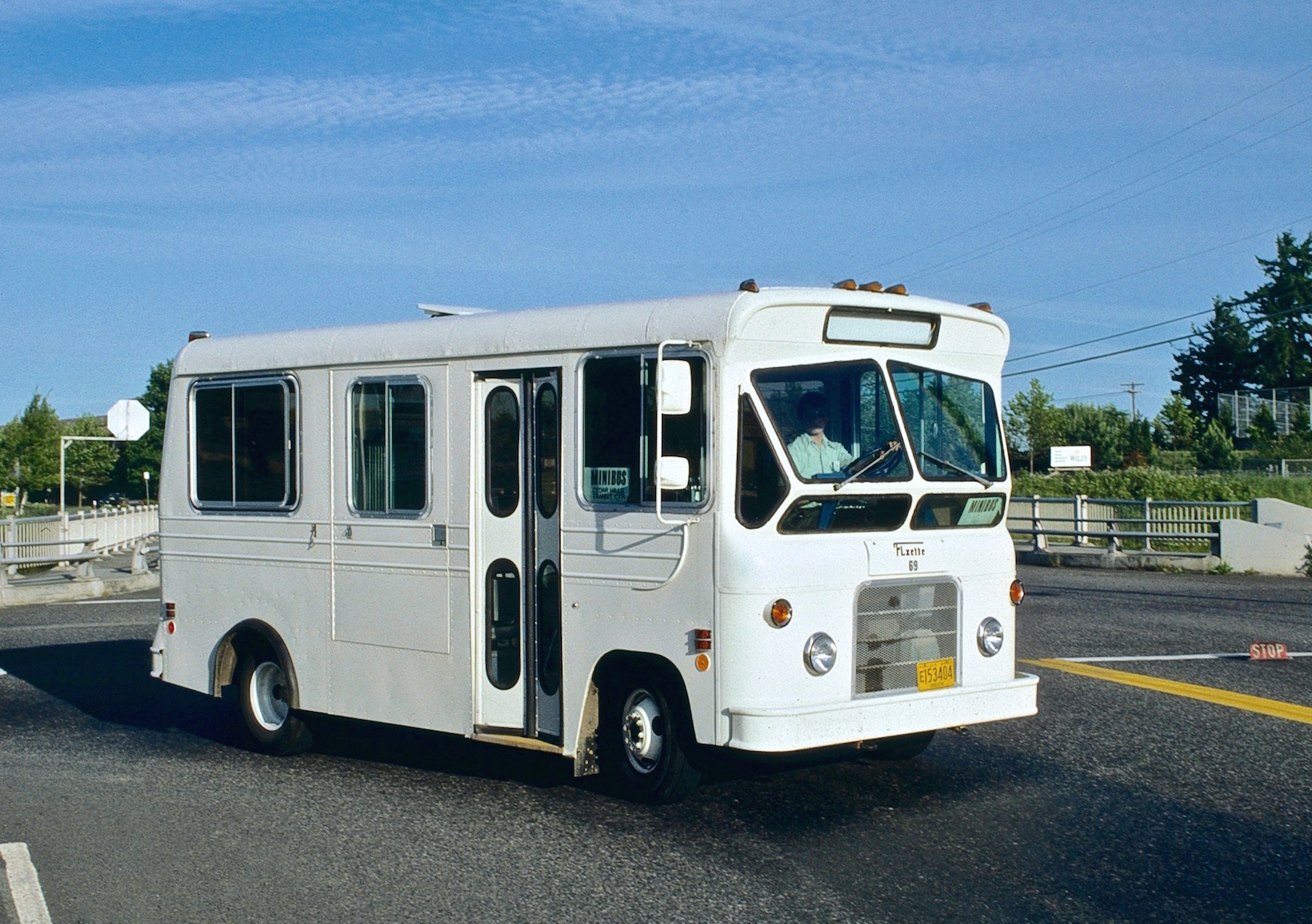
A Flxette minibus in 1984

- Motorcycle sidecar (1913-early 1920s)
- Intercity coach (1924–1932)
- Funeral car (1925–1942, 1946–1952, 1959–1964)
- Ambulance (1925–1952, 1946–1952, 1959–1964)
- "Airway" intercity coach (1932–1936)
- "Clipper" intercity coach (1937–1942, 1944–1950)
- Parts for Liberty ships, M4 tanks, F4U Corsair fighter aircraft, and Goodyear "L" type blimps (1942–1945)
- "Airporter" intercity coach (1946–1950)
- "C-1" intercity coach (1950)
- "VisiCoach" intercity coach (1950–1958)
- FL "Fageoliner" transit bus (1953–1954)
- FT "Flxible Twin" transit bus (1953–1959)
- VL-100 "VistaLiner" two-level intercity coach (1954–1959)
- "StarLiner" intercity coach (1957–1967)
- "Hi-Level" intercity coach (1959–1962)
- "New Look" transit bus (1960–1978)
- "FlxLiner" intercity coach (1963–1969)
- "Flxette" light duty transit bus (1964–1976)
- "Flxible" Cruiser Motor Home (1967–1969)
- 870 "Advanced Design Bus" transit bus (1978–1982)
- METRO "Advanced Design Bus" (1983–1996); METRO "A" (1983–1987), METRO "B" (1988–1991), METRO "C" (1992), METRO "D" (1993–1994) and METRO "E" (1995–1996)

=== Buick conversions ===
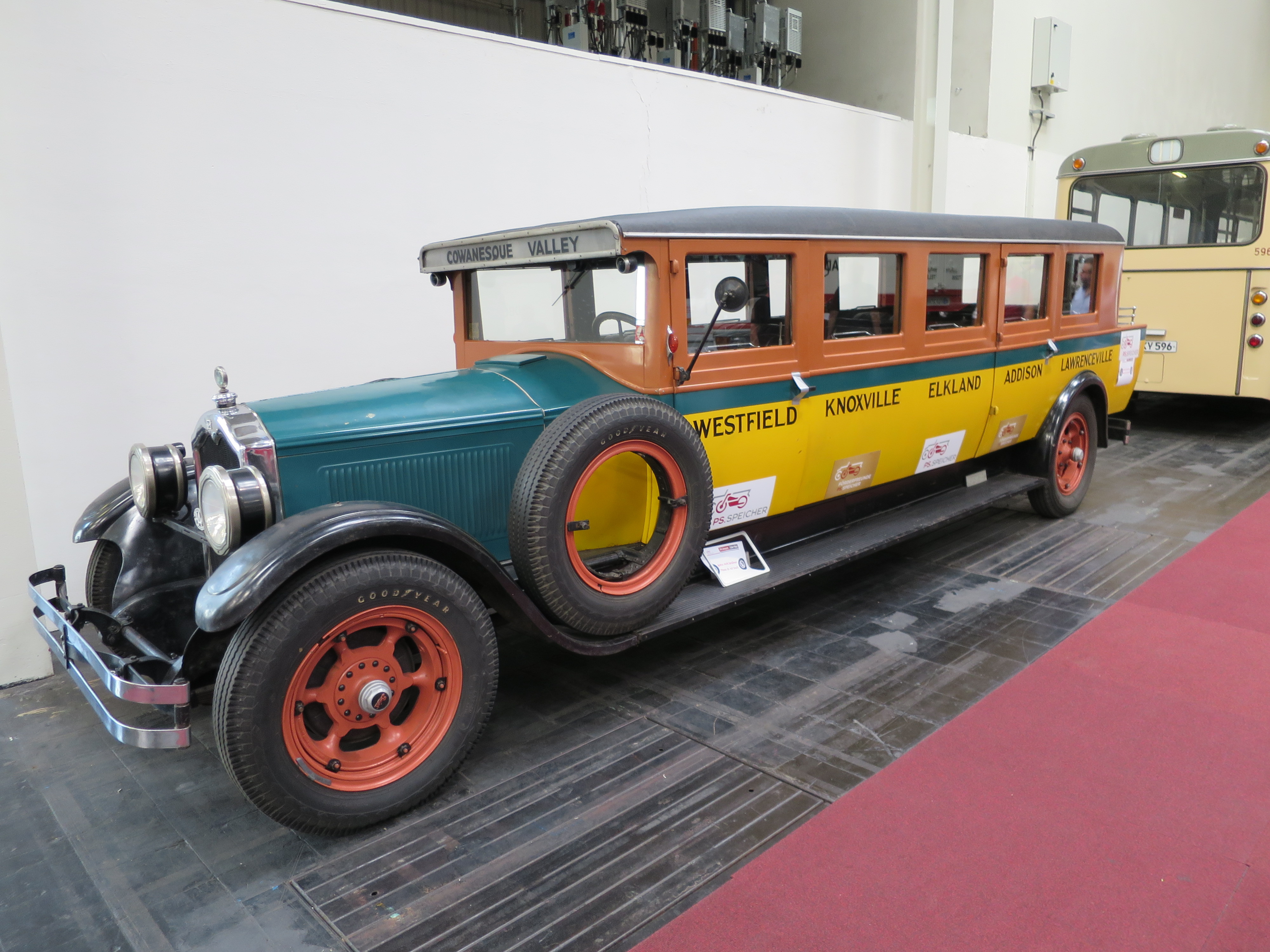
1927 motorbus

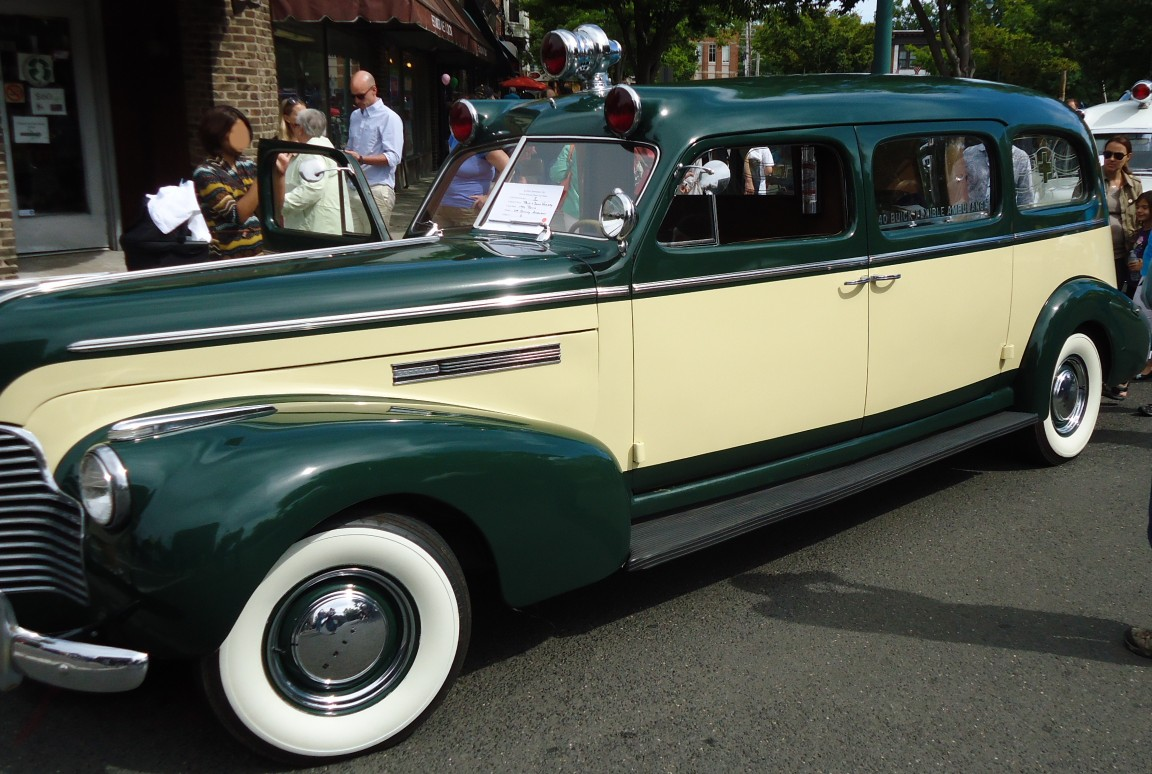
1940 ambulance

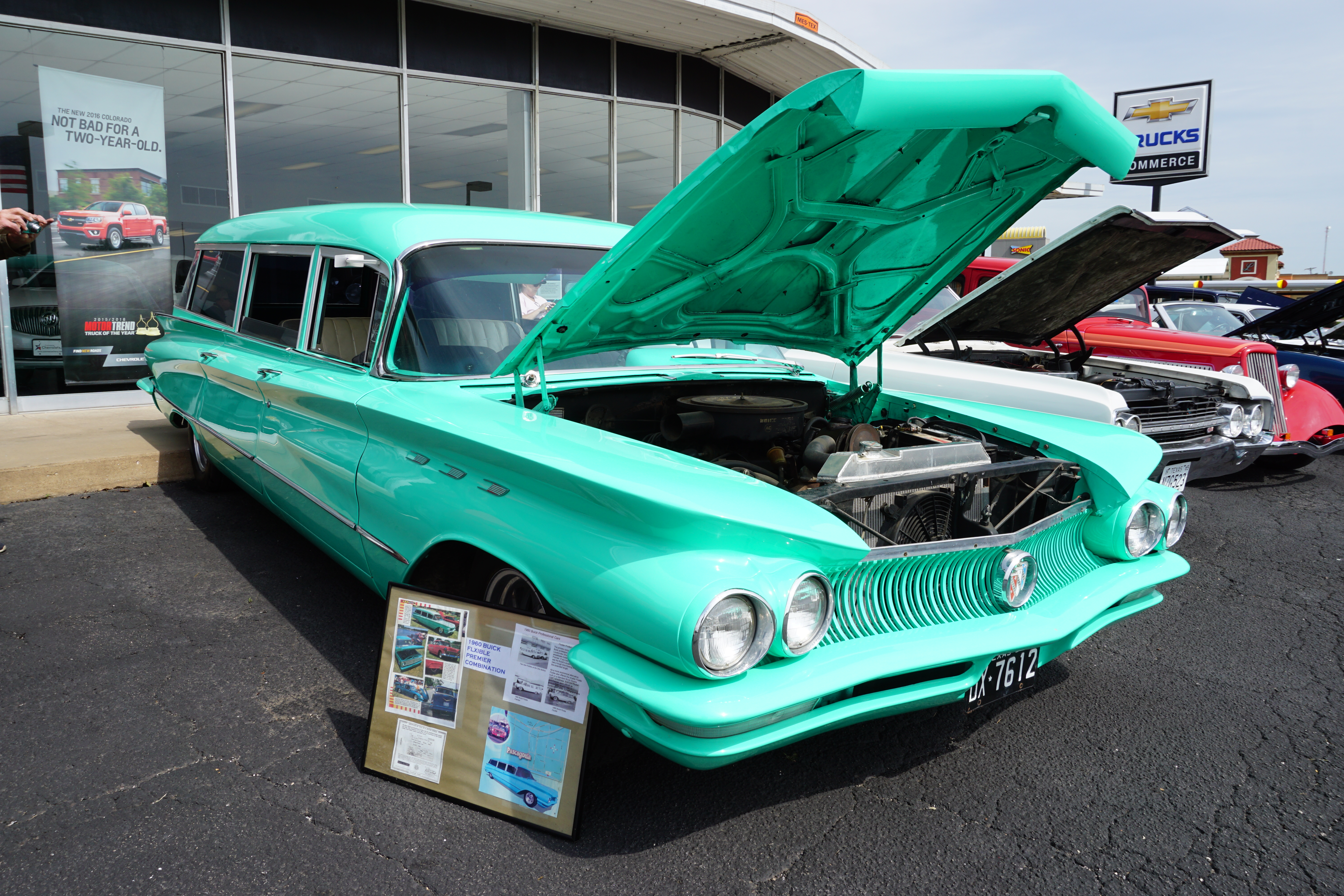
1960 hearse

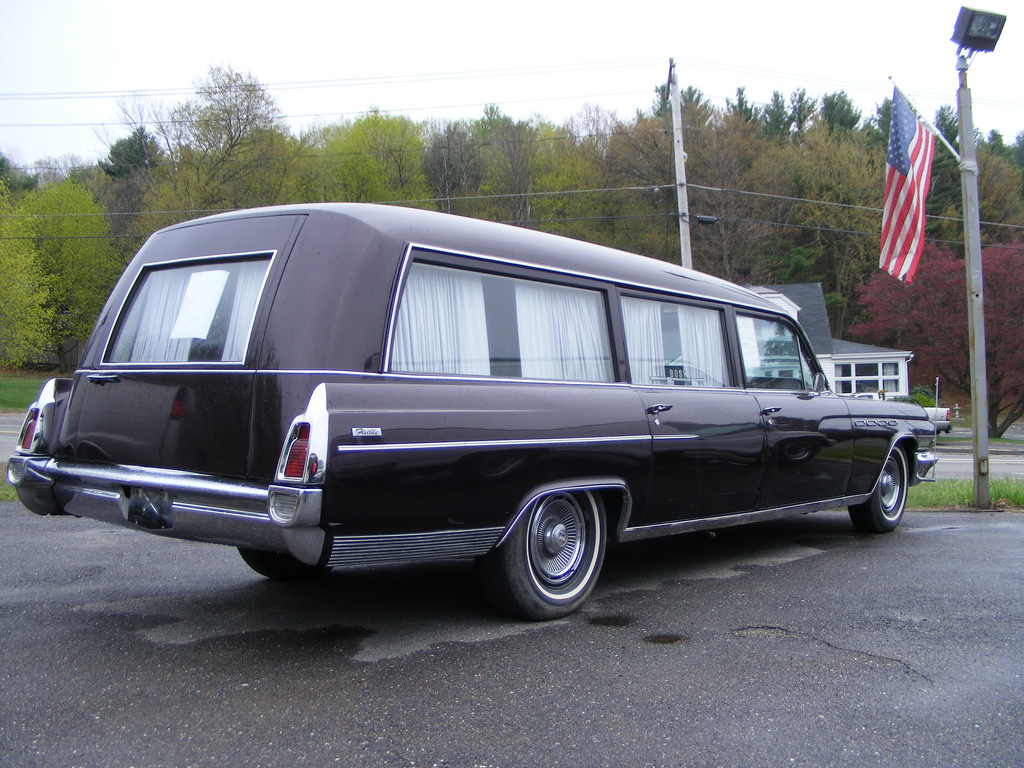
1963 hearse

== Flxible Owners International ==
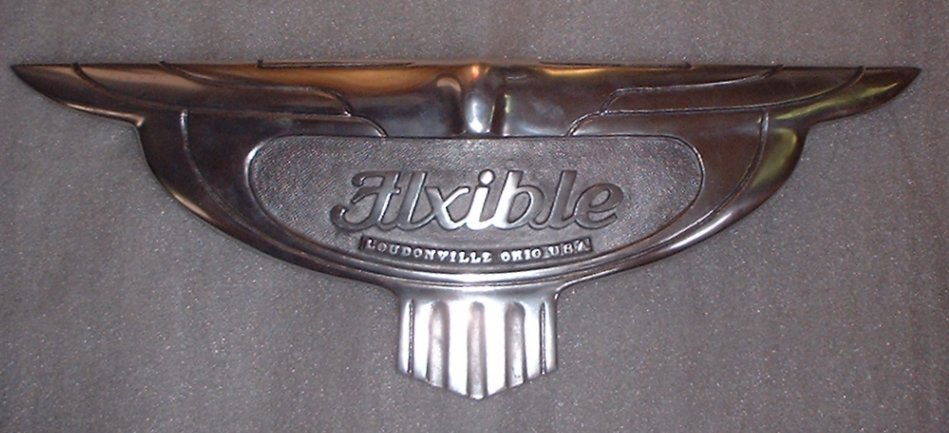
Clipper-era Flxible nose emblem

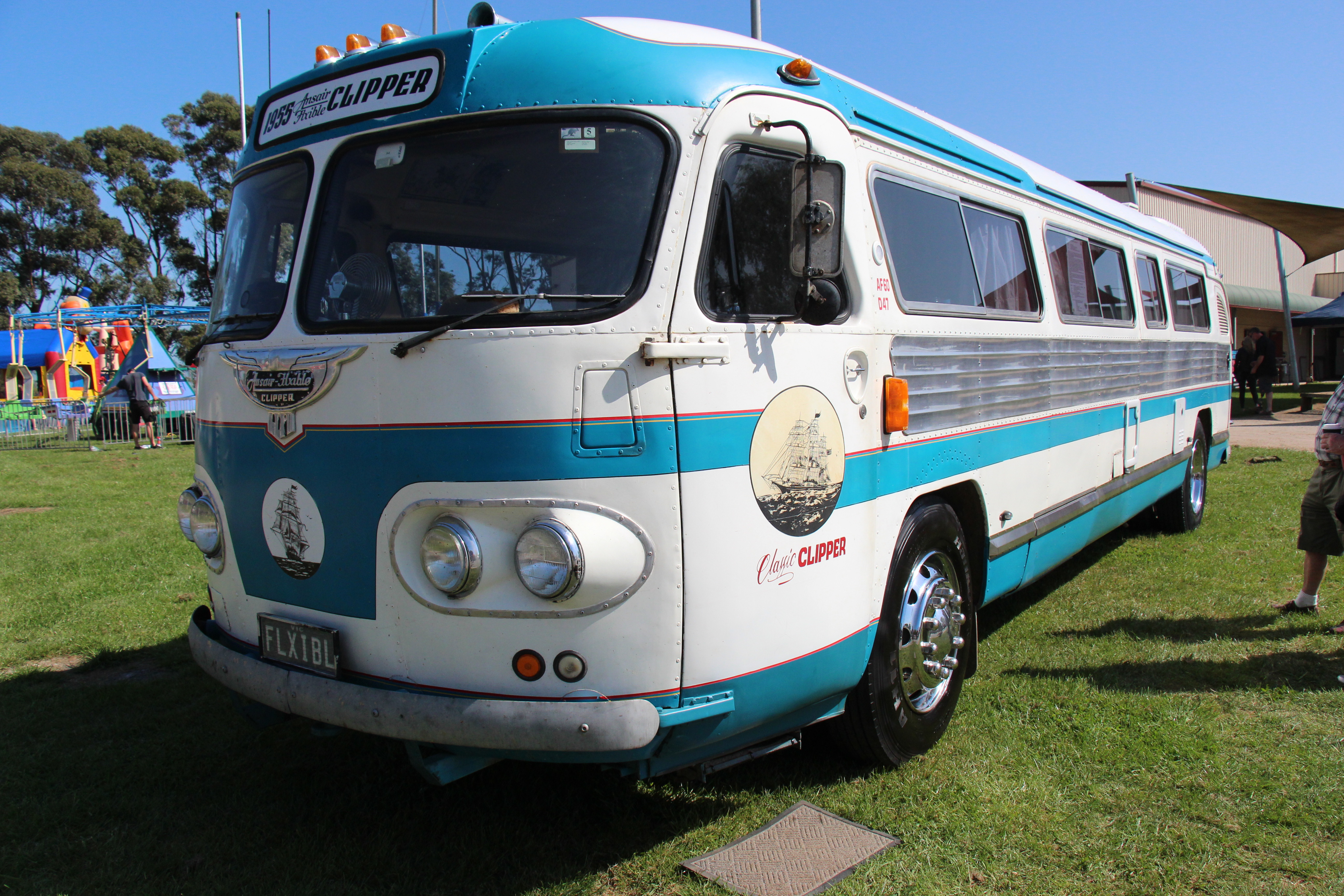
One of 131 Australian-built Clippers

Flxible Owners International (see external link) was founded in the mid-1980s as an offshoot of the Family Motor Coach Association, and is dedicated to the preservation of buses and coaches produced by Flxible. The organization holds a rally in Loudonville biannually, in even-numbered years and normally in mid-July, where many preserved Flxible coaches and buses may be seen.

The majority of vehicles owned by members are of the Clipper series (Clipper, Visicoach, Starliner) that were produced from the 1930s until 1967. However, there are also quite a few "non-clipper" Flxible coaches that are owned, maintained, and operated by proud Flxible owners. This includes the Starliner, VL100 (VistaLiner), Hi Level, and Flxliner as well as some of the more modern transit buses. Most of these vehicles have been converted to motor homes; however, there are still a few examples of seated coaches belonging to members.

== See also ==
- RTS, a line of buses that competed with Flxible's last line of buses, the Flxible Metro
- New Flyer Industries, a bus manufacturer that has replaced Flxible in terms of dominance
