= Flxible Metro =

North American transit bus

Flxible Metro/Grumman 870
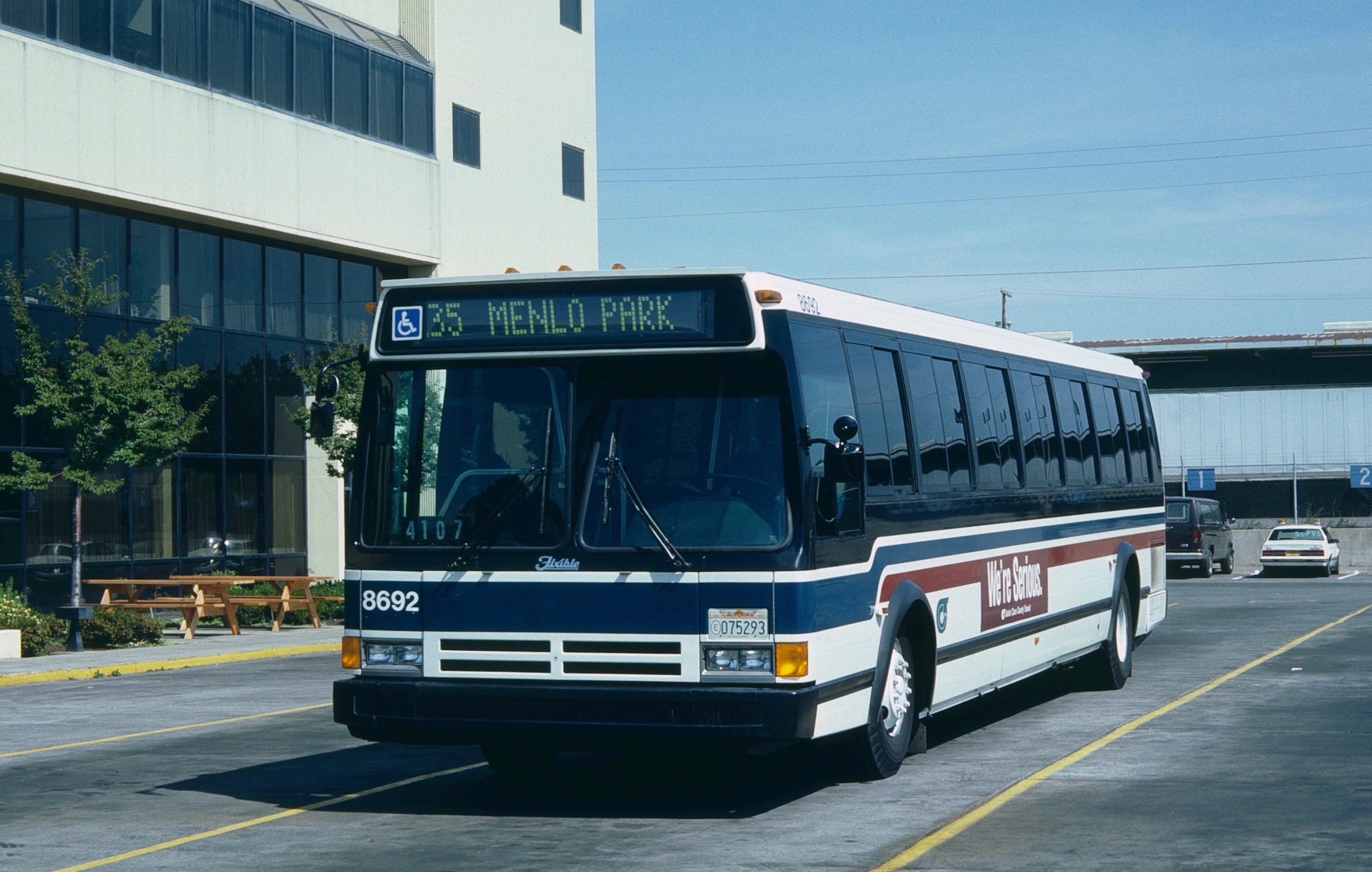
- A Flxible Metro 40102-6C of Santa Clara County Transit (San Jose, California) in 1987

Overview
- Manufacturer: Flxible
- Production: 1978–1983 (as Grumman 870); 1983–1995 (as Flxible Metro)
- Assembly: Delaware, Ohio

Body and chassis
- Body style: Monocoque stressed skin

Powertrain
- Engine: Detroit Diesel or Cummins
- Transmission: ZF, Voith, or Allison

Dimensions
- Length: 30 ft (9.14 m), 35 ft (10.67 m), or 40 ft (12.19 m)
- Width: 96 in (2.44 m) or 102 in (2.59 m)
- Height: 120 in (3.05 m)

Chronology
- Predecessor: Flxible New Look

The Flxible Metro is a transit bus that was assembled and manufactured by the Flxible Corporation from 1983 until 1995. From 1978 until early-1983, when Flxible was owned by Grumman, the model was known as the Grumman 870, with a Grumman nameplate. The earlier model 870 experienced a large number of major design defects and deficiencies, some of which led to the filing of lawsuits against the company by purchasers, and the successor "Metro" model addressed those defective design issues.

Over the combined 17-year production history, a total of 14,456 were built, of which 4,642 were model 870 and 9,814 were Metros.

== History ==
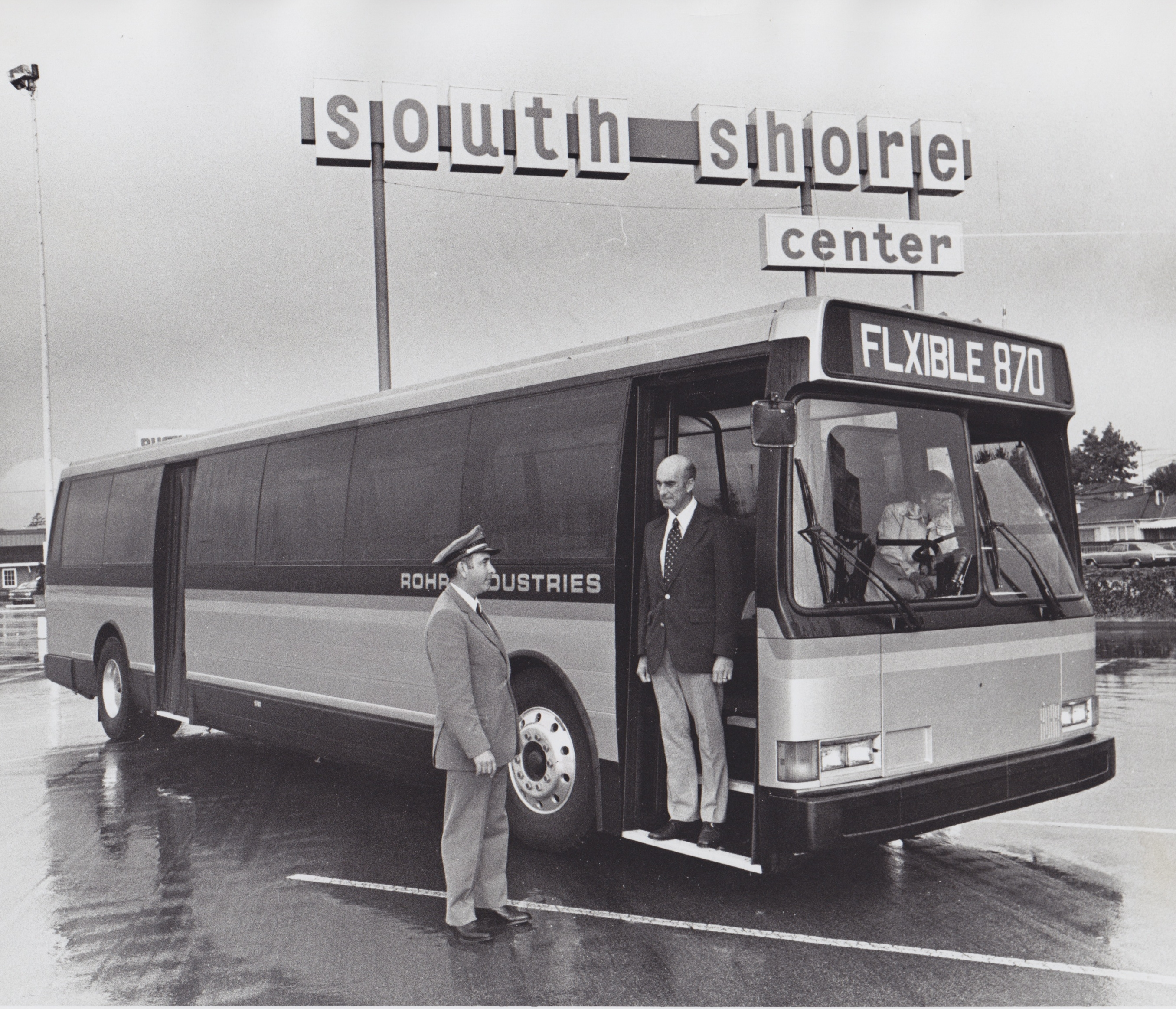
Flxible/Rohr 870 prototype at Alameda South Shore Center while testing with AC Transit, September 1976

Under the ownership of Rohr Industries since 1970, while their very popular Flxible New Look was still in production, Rohr began development of what would become the Grumman 870 Advanced Design Bus. The Grumman 870 bus was one of two advanced-design buses (the other being the Rapid Transit Series (RTS II) developed by rival General Motors and later taken by MTS). Both models were compromises by the Urban Mass Transit Administration (UMTA), which sought to develop a "Transbus" design that would be "attractive, roomy, comfortable", and easier for elderly and disabled customers to board, accepting these two models as compromises. At the time, the federal government would subsidize the purchase of only the 870 or the RTS II.

In 1978, Rohr sold Flxible to Grumman for US$55 million, with the sale including the sale of two prototypes of what would become the 870. In spite of the fact that the second prototype failed testing as the result of a cracked "A" frame, and with an endurance test not yet performed, Grumman decided that the 870 was ready for production, and discontinued the Flxible New Look almost as soon as the purchase closed (more in "Litigation resulting" below). The first 870 rolled off the assembly line in spring 1978. Under Grumman ownership, Grumman-Flxible (as the company was called at the time) received a major order of buses from the New York City Transit Authority along with other agencies. The NYC Transit Authority order, built in 1980, is notable because this batch would expose the design flaw in A-frame noted during testing: the inability of the bus to withstand wear and tear in cities where potholes were a problem, forcing all 870s built until that time to be taken out of service beginning that December while repairs to the A-frame were made, which would cost Grumman $7 million to fix. A total of 2,656 buses, including buses in Atlanta, Chicago, Connecticut, Houston, Los Angeles and Orange County, California needed to be fixed. In early 1982 Grumman announced that the 870 model would be renamed "Grumman Metro".

Eventually, Grumman was forced to sell the line to General Automotive Corporation in 1983 for $41 million, a 25-percent loss after developing what by this time had become known as the "Flxible Metro", which addressed all of the shortcomings of the Model 870 in 1982. Under the ownership of General Automotive, the Flxible nameplate was restored to the buses.

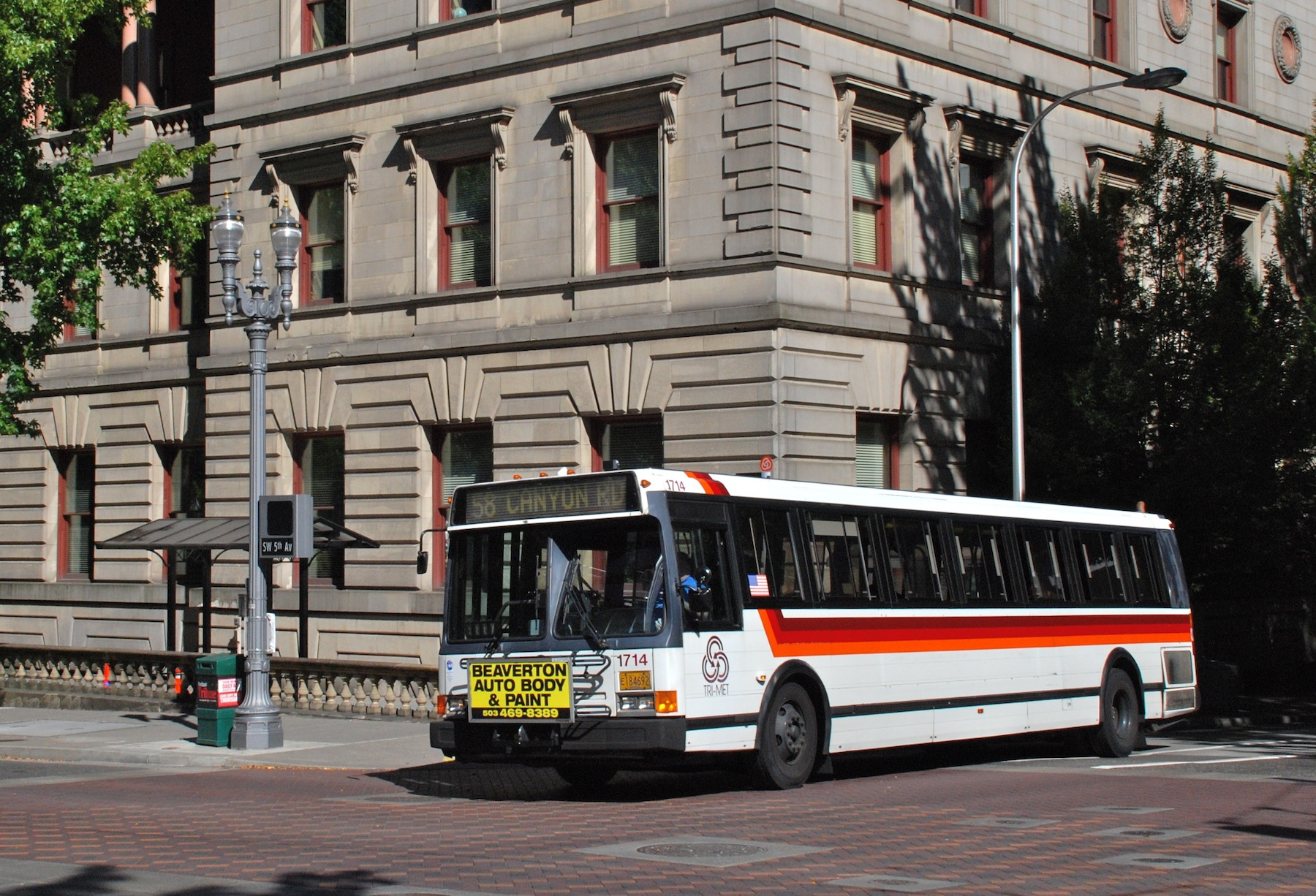
A 1992 Flxible Metro 40102-6C in Portland, Oregon, in 2013. TriMet was one of the last agencies operating Flxible Metro buses past 2010.

Production continued until late 1995, when financial problems prompted the company to suspend production and lay off most of its workforce at the Delaware, Ohio, factory. The layoffs were initially planned to be temporary, but ultimately became permanent, and in 1996 Flxible was forced into Chapter 11 bankruptcy and liquidated. Parent company General Automotive would meet the same fate as Flxible (bankruptcy and liquidation) the following year.

The last Flxible Metros delivered were ones delivered in November 1995 to Monterey-Salinas Transit (Monterey, California), and the Baltimore Metropolitan Transit Authority (Baltimore, Maryland). However, neither of these orders included the Metro with the highest serial number (106591), which had been delivered the previous month to Columbus, Ohio. The official production total for the Metro model from company records is 9,820, but there is strong evidence indicating that the last six of the 25-bus order for Baltimore were never built, and this makes the total more likely to be 9,814 units.

In 1995, some used 870s were purchased from the Central Ohio Transit Authority (Columbus, Ohio) by Kirov, Russia, where they were used until 2004.

== Litigation resulting ==
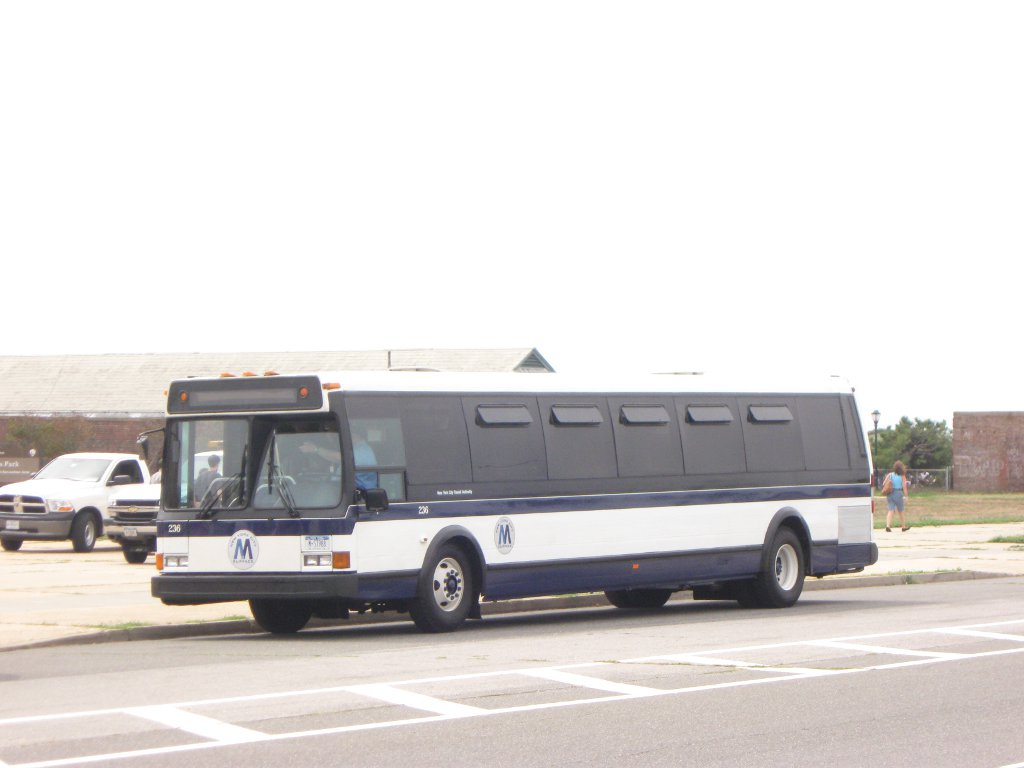
New York City Transit Grumman 870 236, preserved as an historic vehicle

The Grumman era of production would result in a number of lawsuits related to defects in the A-frame of the 870, involving either Flxible's former owner Rohr or the Metropolitan Transportation Authority of New York.

1. The Metropolitan Transportation Authority (MTA), in whose buses where the first cracked A-frame problem was noticed in early December 1980 at their Ulmer Park Depot, yanked its NYC Transit Authority fleet for the first time in 1980 (a separate batch for MSBA was built with the problem rectified the next year) and sued Grumman. This lawsuit would result in a settlement to fix all 870 buses built until that time (2,656 examples in all), along with an early termination of the build contract where the final 200 buses of the order were transferred to General Motors.
2. In 1983, shortly before Grumman sold Flxible, Grumman would sue Rohr Industries for $500 million in federal court, claiming that it was not aware of design flaws in the 870 model before it began production shortly after the sale closed. Rohr was quickly granted summary judgment, which was upheld on appeal; the court noted that Grumman indeed had access to all of the testing information, including knowledge that testing was incomplete.
3. In 1984, following a fire in a Model 870 NYCTA bus number 411, David L. Gunn, on only his fifth day on the job with the MTA, ordered the Grumman 870 fleet within New York City off the road for the final time (the units for MSBA built in 1981, owned by Nassau County (NY), as well as the units built for the five private companies in the Borough of Queens, New York remained in service until the mid-1990s). That May, the MTA sued Grumman again (which by this time no longer owned the line), asking for $184 million in damages as the result in fraud and $140 million to purchase replacements, referring to the buses as "lemons". This time, Grumman would countersue the MTA for $1 billion, claiming that poor maintenance was the cause, and took out full-page advertisements in local media attesting to this fact. The MTA would end up paying $56 million back to the Urban Mass Transit Administration for refusing to run the buses. The buses would sit for nearly two years at the Brooklyn Army Terminal until late 1985, when UMTA exchanged the payment for equity in MTA properties, allowing for 835 of the 851 buses to be sold. 620 of the buses were rebuilt and sold to New Jersey Transit, 175 of these buses were also rebuilt and sold to the Queen City Metro of Cincinnati, Ohio, with the remaining 40 buses rebuilt and sold to a transit agency in Puerto Rico. The 16 unsold buses were held for evidence until the lawsuit was resolved; one bus (236) was preserved, 13 were sold to the Pioneer Valley Transportation Authority of Springfield, Massachusetts in early 1985, and the remaining two were scrapped.

== Model history ==
The model history of the Grumman 870/Flxible Metro is as follows:

Grumman-Flxible 870 (1978–1982)
Initially, the same model naming that was used for the Flxible New Look's third generation was retained.
Nominal seating capacity	Width	Engine type	Air conditioning
35 = 30 ft 45 = 35 ft 53 = 40 ft	096 = 96 in 102 = 102 in	-6 = Detroit Diesel 6V71^{1} -8 = Detroit Diesel 8V71^{2}	-0 = No air conditioning -1 = Air conditioning
Beginning in April 1980, the model designation was revised, with the first two digits now indicating length instead of nominal seating capacity.
Length	Width	Engine type	Air conditioning
30 = 30 ft 35 = 35 ft 40 = 40 ft	096 = 96 in 102 = 102 in	-6 = Detroit Diesel 6V71^{1} -8 = Detroit Diesel 8V71^{2}	-0 = No air conditioning -1 = Air conditioning
Flxible Metro (1983–1996)
Following the purchase of Grumman by General Automotive, the model naming was revised to better identify the engines used.
Length	Width	Engine type	Air conditioning
30 = 30 ft 35 = 35 ft 40 = 40 ft	096 = 96 in 102 = 102 in	-4D = Detroit Diesel Series 50 -6C = Cummins L10 -6C8 = Cummins C8.3 -6M = Cummins M11E -6N = Detroit Diesel 6V71 (1983-1992) -6T = Detroit Diesel 6V92TA (1983-1992) -6TL = Detroit Diesel 6V71TA (1983–1989) or 6L71TA (1990–1992)	-0 = No air conditioning -1 = Air conditioning
Notes
1. Some 1981–1983 units used the Detroit Diesel 6V92TA, including 1981 models which went to New Jersey Transit and Santa Monica Municipal Bus Lines.; 2. Some 1978–1981 units used Cummins VTB903, including a few from 1978 which went to Metropolitan Atlanta Rapid Transit Authority.; A letter is often used to denote the different generations of the Metro: A = 1983–1986; B = 1987–1991; C = 1992; D = 1993–3rd quarter 1994; E = 4th quarter 1994–1996

== See also ==
- Rapid Transit Series—competing Advanced Design Bus
- List of buses
