= Electric bus =

Bus powered by electricity

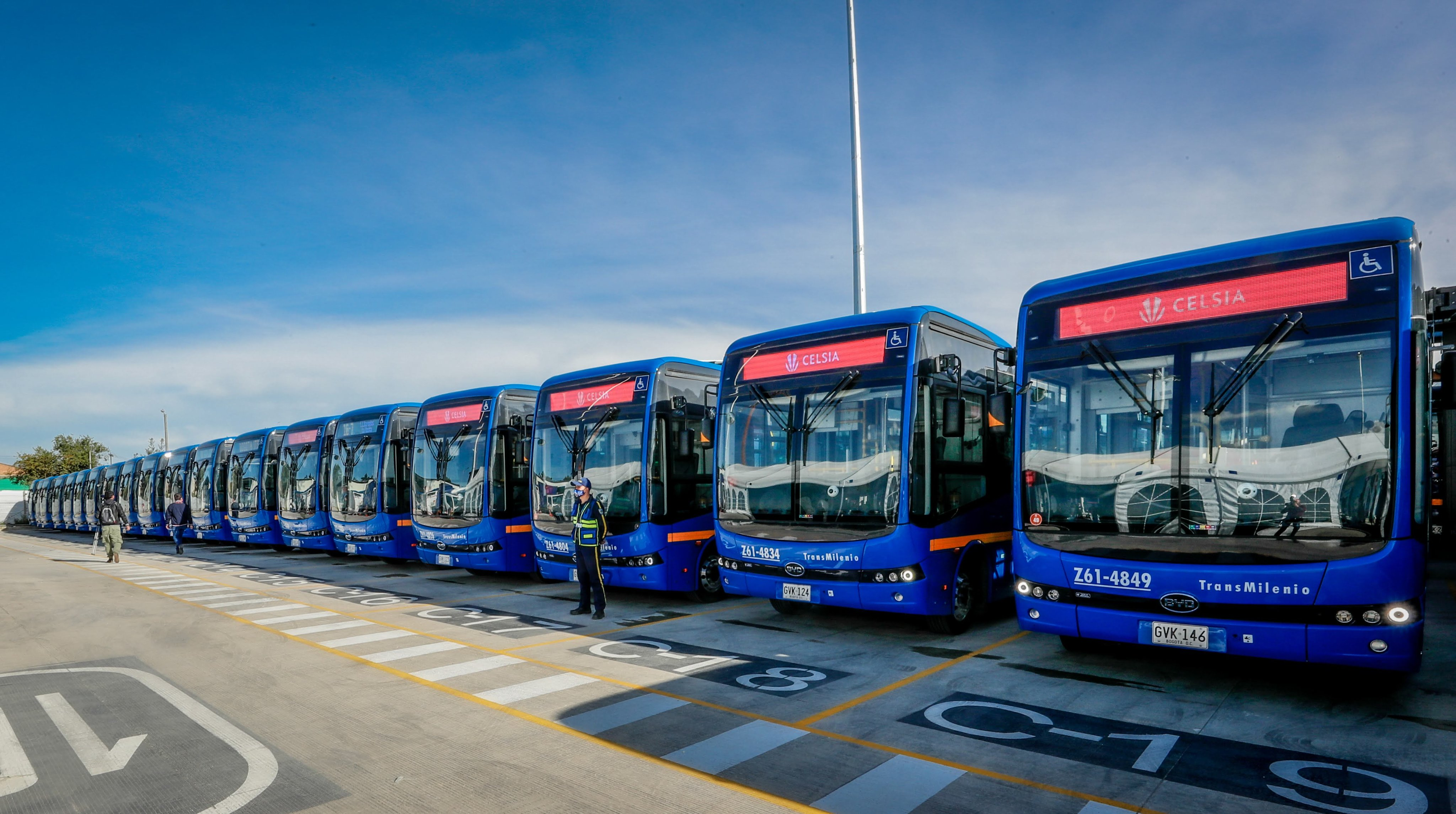
Electric buses in Bogotá

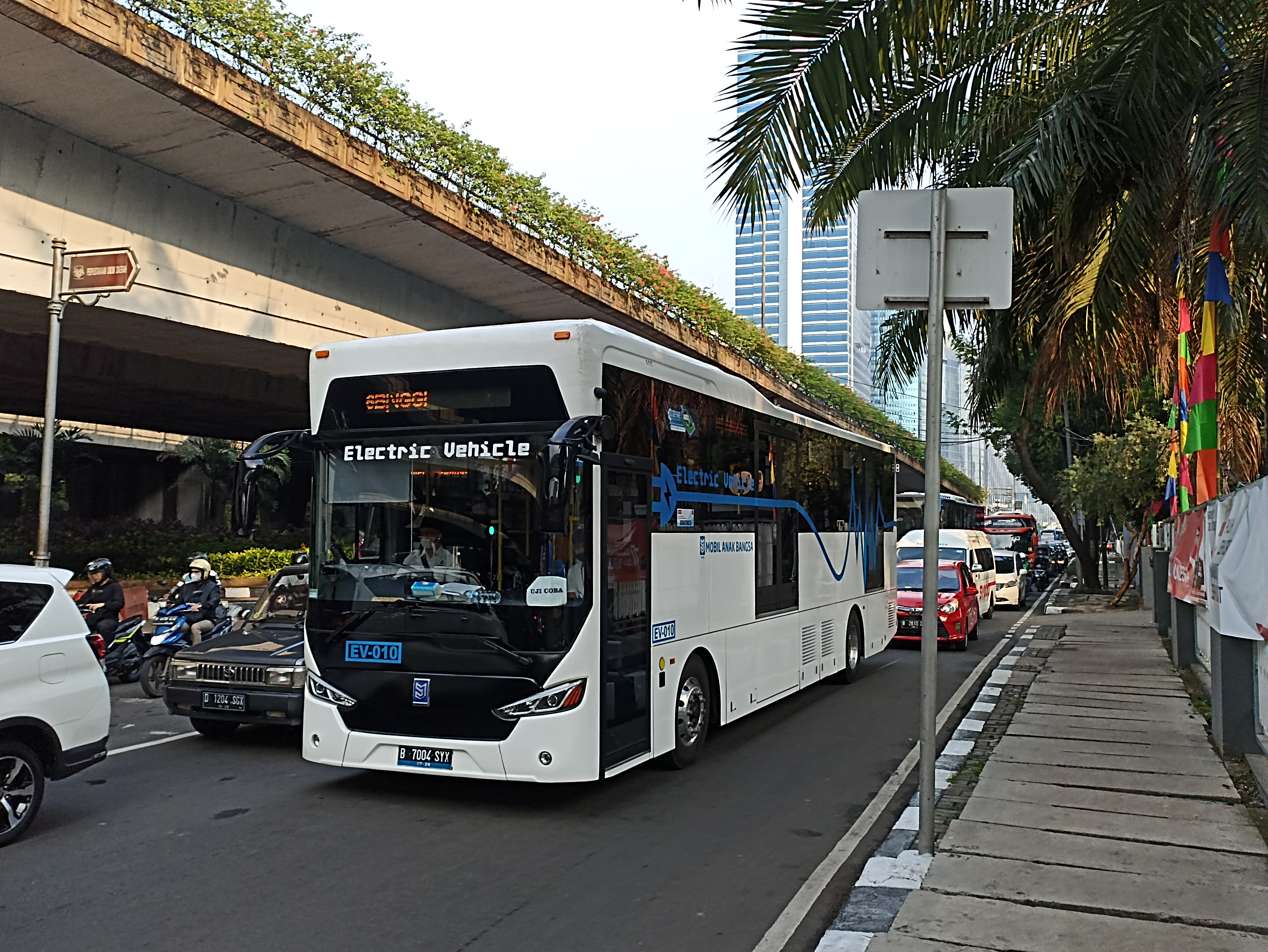
Electric bus in Jakarta

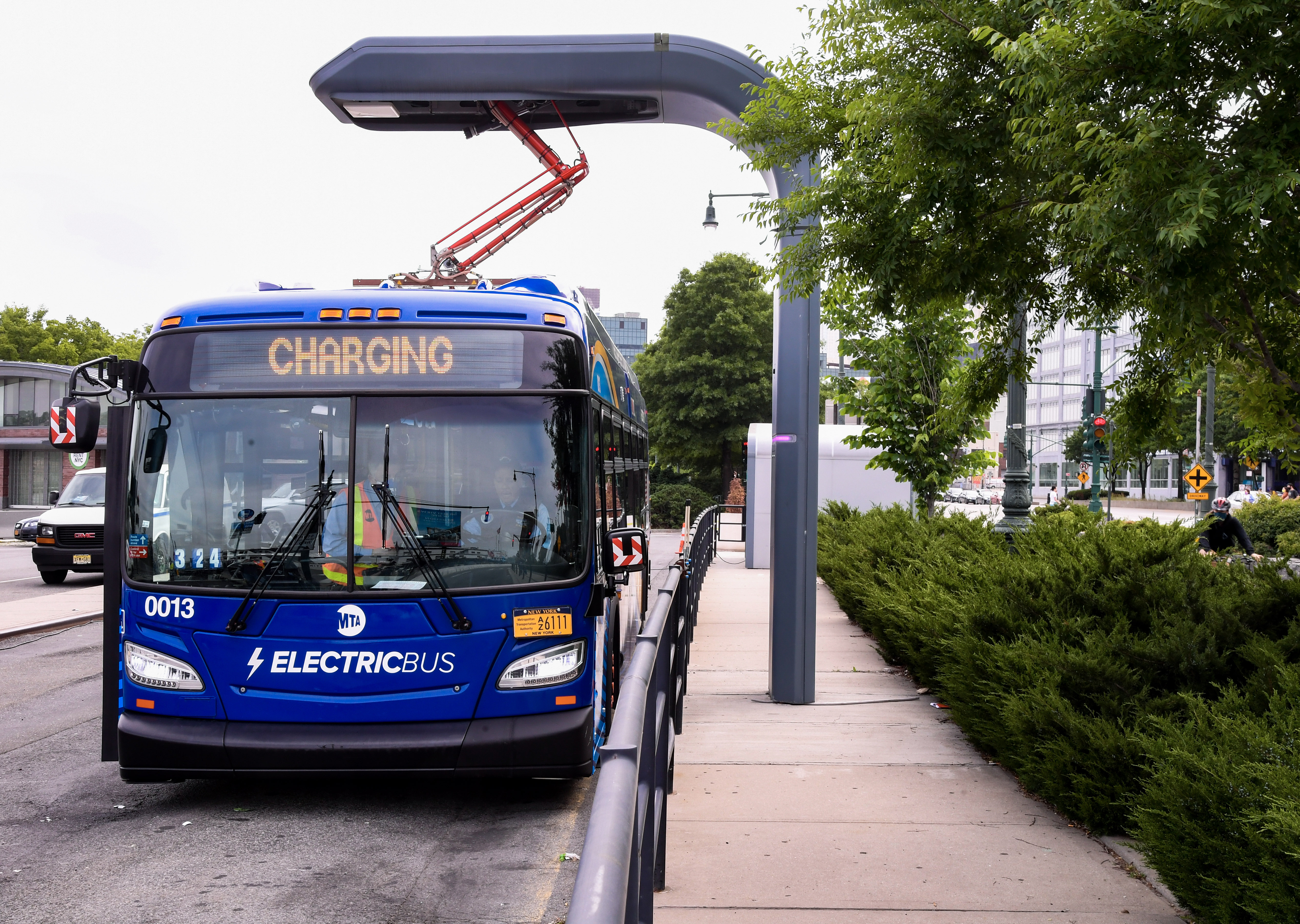
A New Flyer Xcelsior electric bus charging in New York, USA.

An electric bus is a bus that is propelled using electric motors, as opposed to a conventional internal combustion engine. Electric buses can store the needed electrical energy on board, or be fed mains electricity continuously from an external source such as overhead lines. The majority of buses using on-board energy storage are battery electric buses (which is what this article mostly deals with), where the electric motor obtains energy from an onboard battery pack, although examples of other storage modes do exist, such as the gyrobus that uses flywheel energy storage. When electricity is not stored on board, it is supplied by contact with outside power supplies, for example, via a current collector (like the overhead conduction poles in trolleybuses), or with a ground-level power supply, or through inductive charging.

As of 2017, 99% of all battery electric buses in the world have been deployed in Mainland China, with more than 421,000 buses on the road, which is 17% of China's total bus fleet. For comparison, the United States had 300, and Europe had 2,250. By 2021, China's share of electric buses remained at 98% while Europe had reached 8,500 electric buses, with the largest fleet in Europe being Moscow.

== History ==
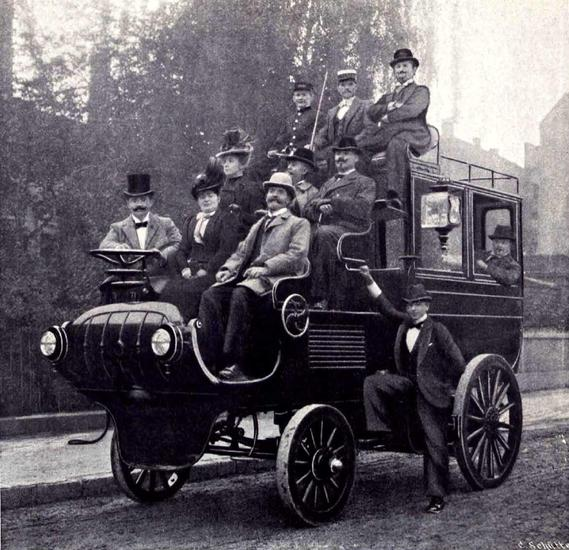
Kühlstein Battery bus, 1899

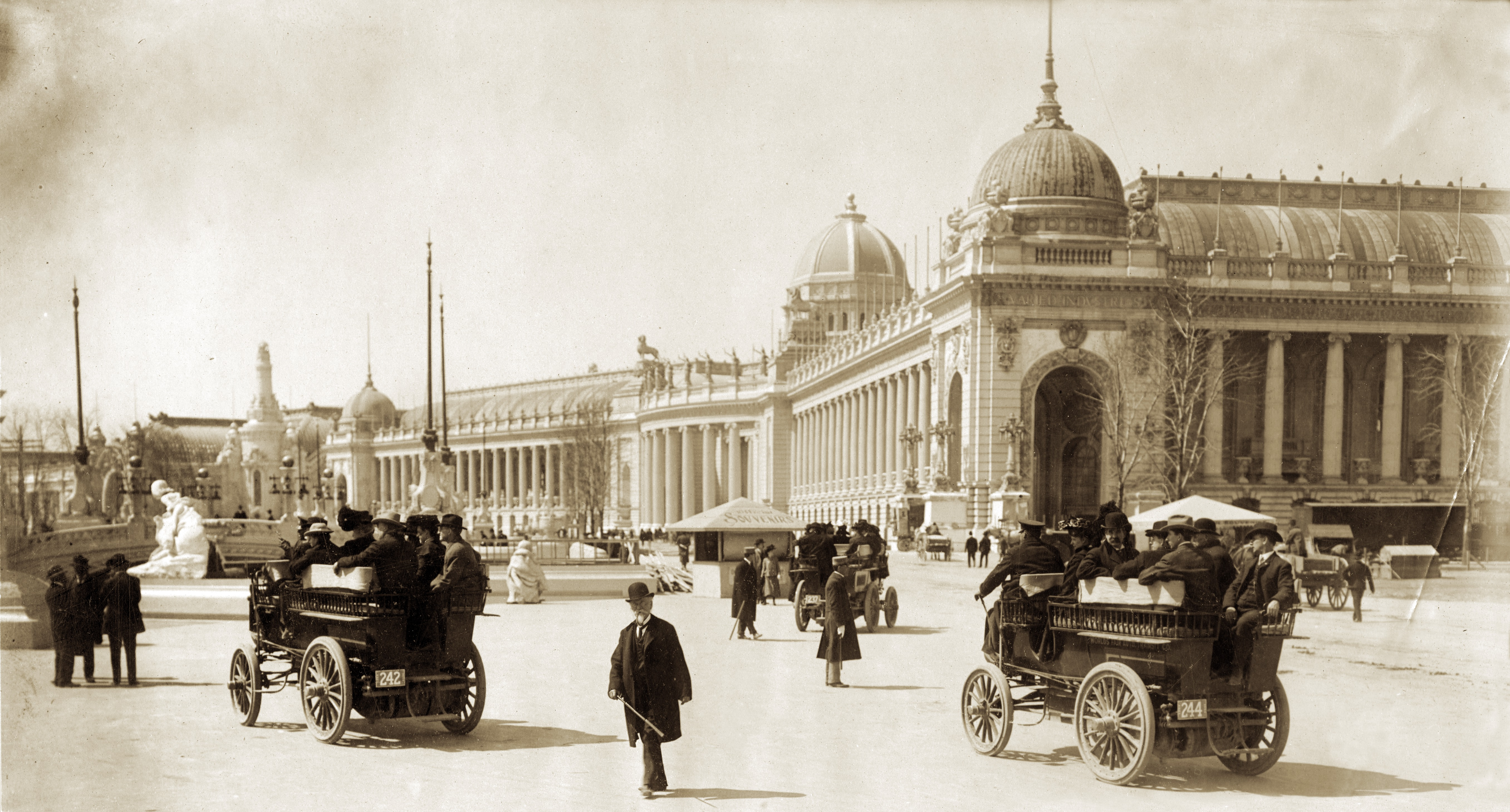
Electric Auto Buses on the Plaza of St. Louis at the 1904 World's Fair.

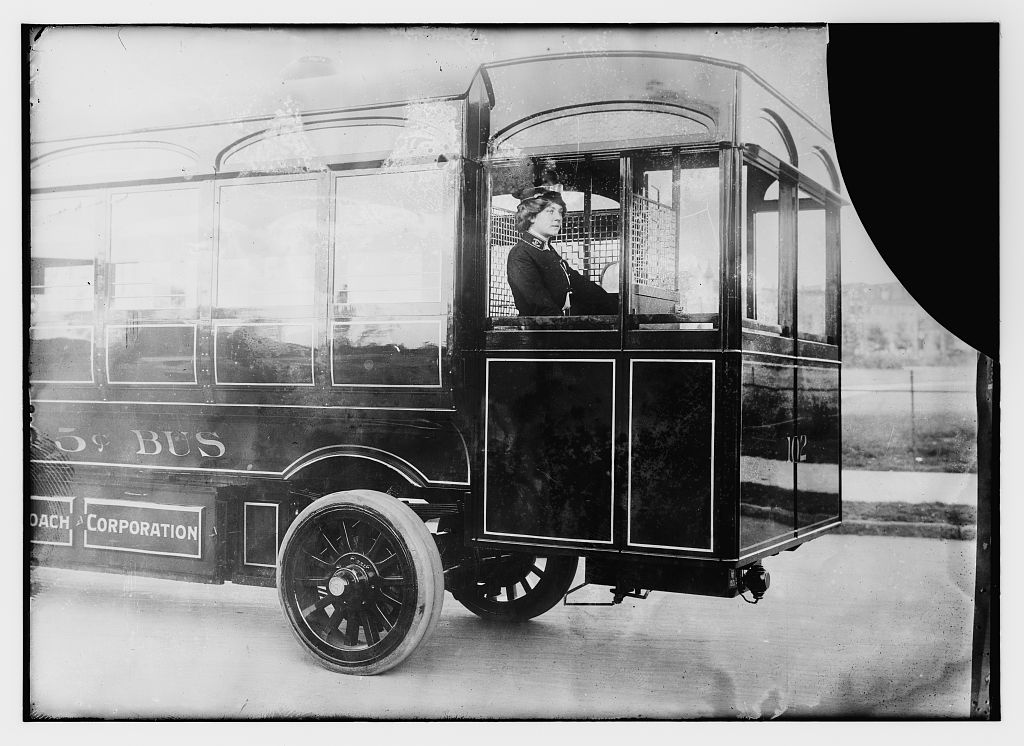
Edison electric bus in 1915

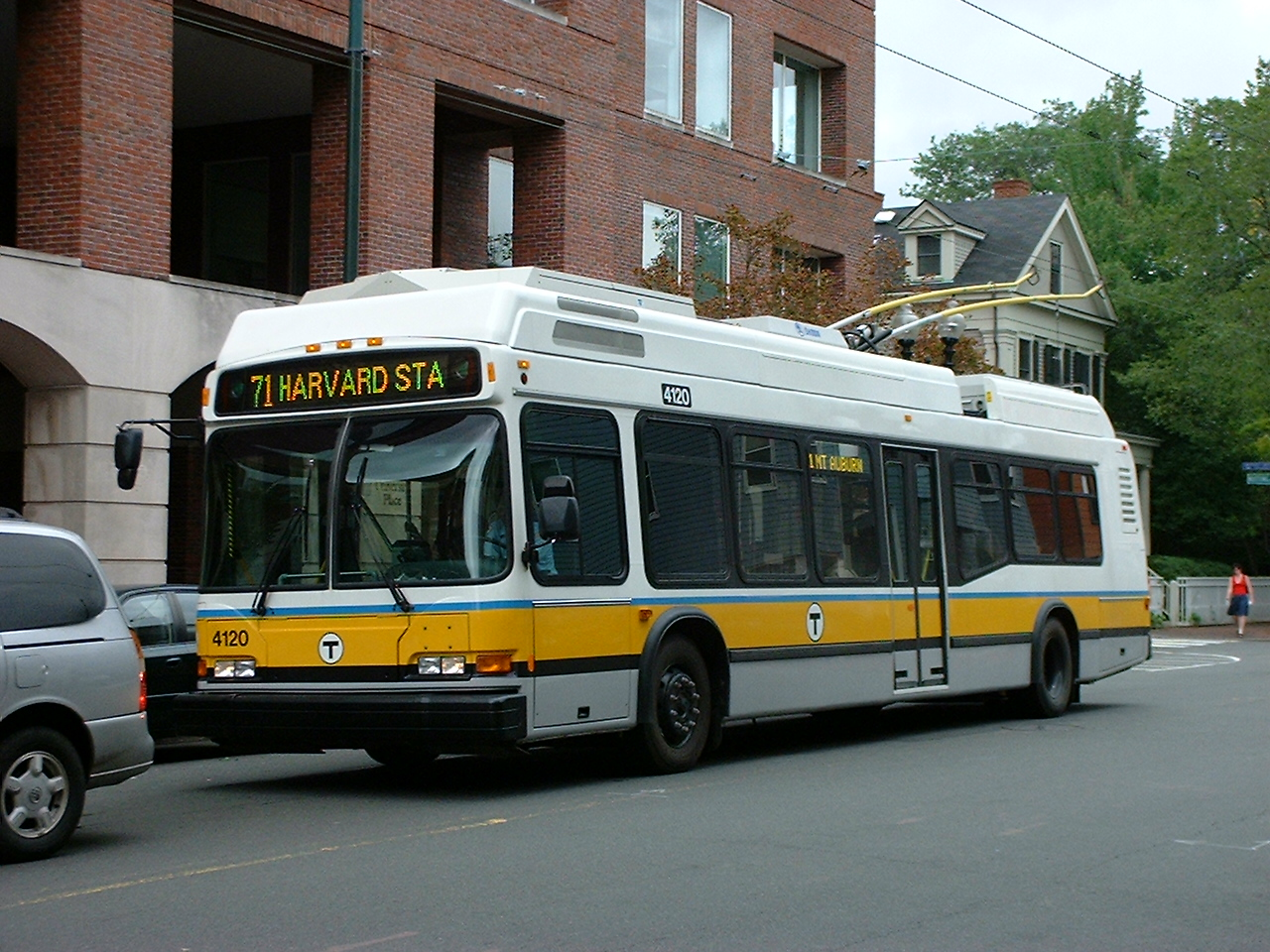
A Massachusetts Bay Transportation Authority Neoplan USA trolleybus in Greater Boston, 2004

A 100% electric bus in Malta, 2024

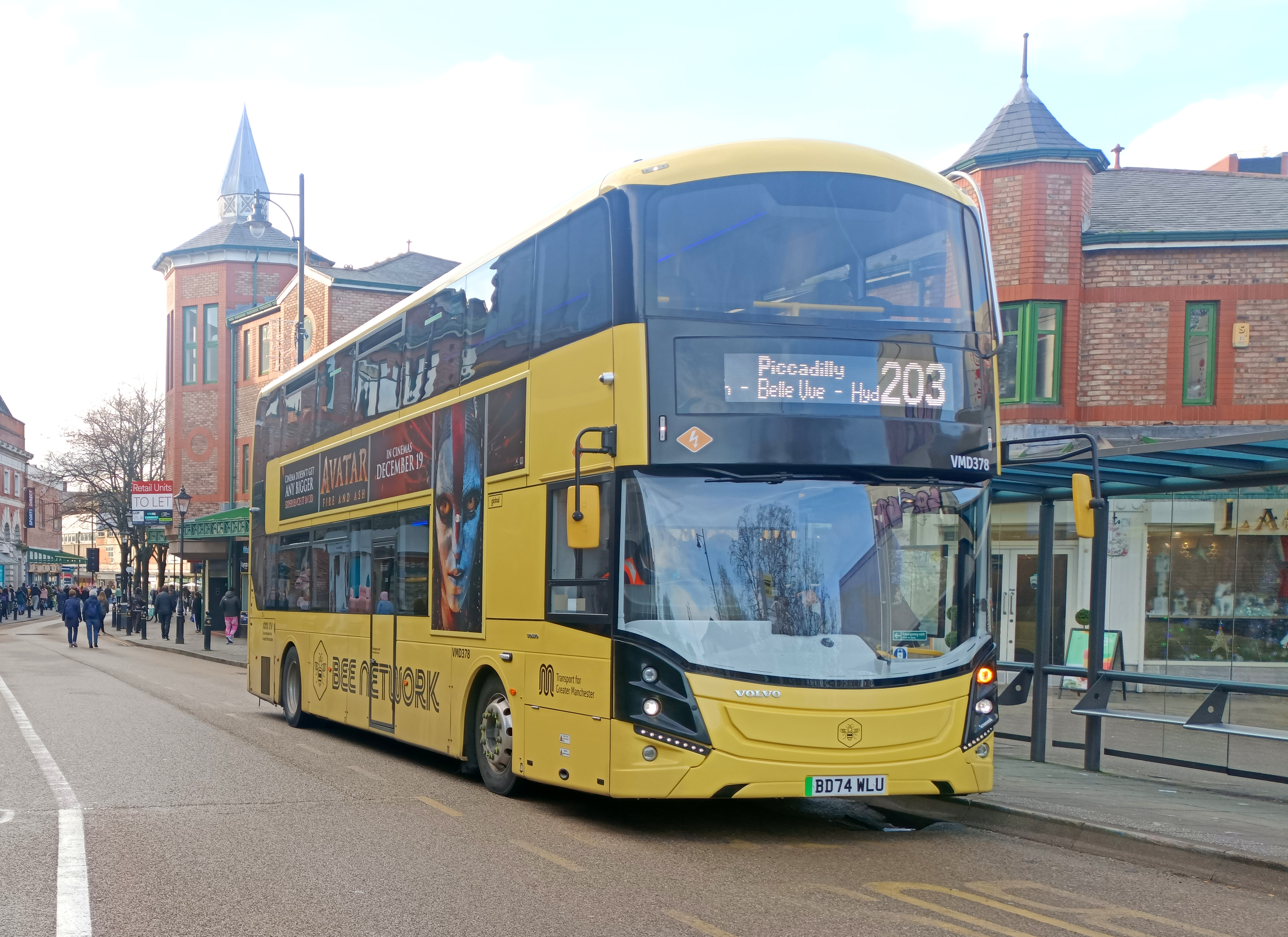
A Bee Network branded Metroline Manchester Volvo BZL battery electric bus in Stockport, 2025

== Principles ==
=== Battery ===
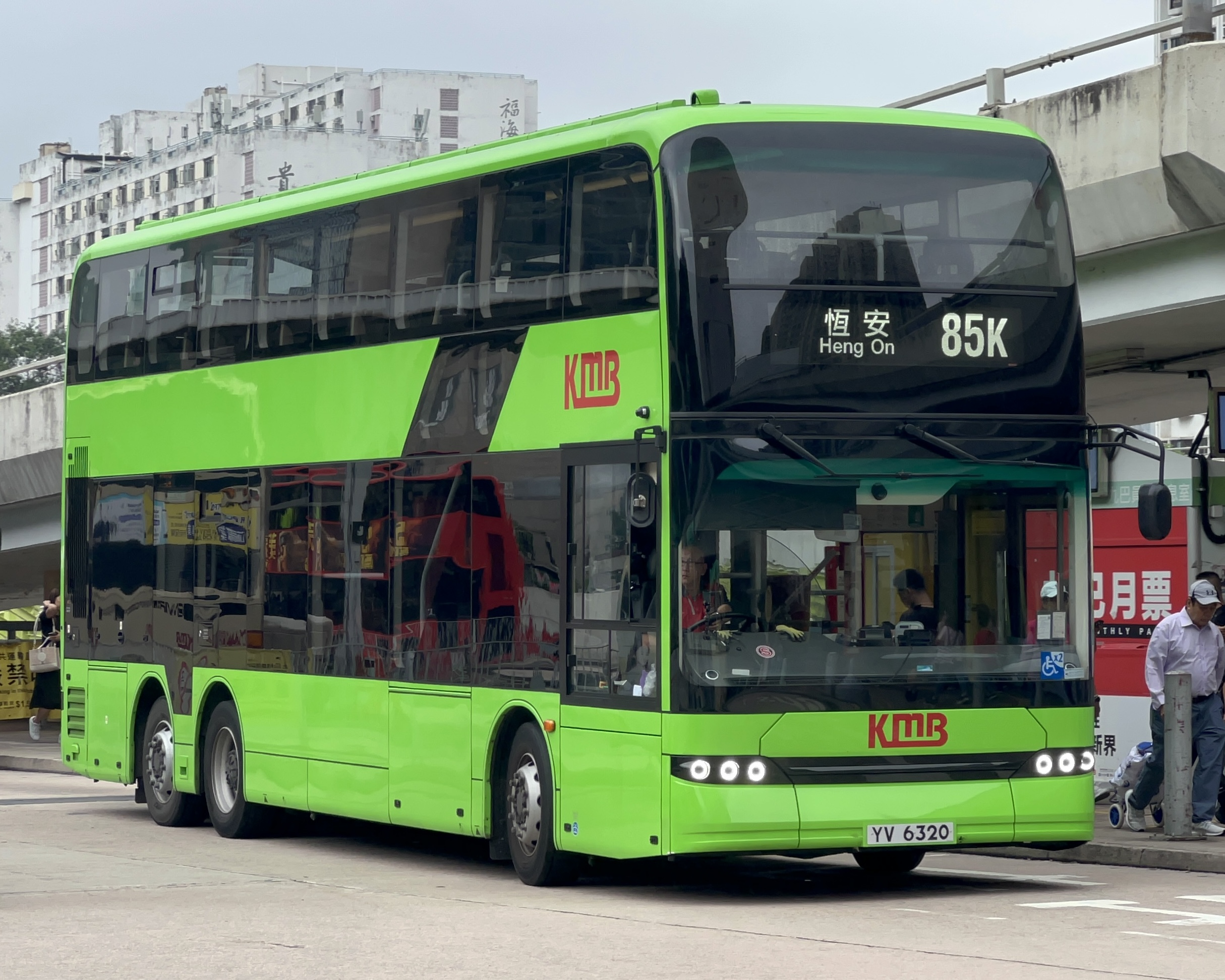
A battery electric double decker bus in Hong Kong

One of the most popular types of electric buses nowadays are battery electric buses. Battery electric buses have the electricity stored on board the vehicle in a battery. As of 2024, battery electric buses could have a range of over 350 km with just one charge, although extreme temperatures, hills, driving style and heavy loads can reduce range.

City driving involves a great deal of accelerating and braking. Due to that, the battery electric bus is superior to diesel bus as it can recharge most of the kinetic energy back into batteries during braking, which reduces brake wear. The use of electric over diesel propulsion reduces noise and pollution in cities.

When operating within a city, it is important to minimize the unloaded and rolling weight of the bus. This can be accomplished by using aluminium as the main construction material. Composite paneling and other lightweight materials can also be used. According to Finnish bus manufacturer Linkker, its fully aluminium bus construction is about 3000 kg lighter than comparably sized modern steel buses, which have a curb weight of 9500 kg. Reducing weight allows for a greater payload and reduces wear to components such as brakes, tires, and joints, achieving cost savings for the operator.

=== Charging ===
Commonly, metropolitan electric busses are charged on-route with 6–8 minutes of charging at 450 kW for every hour of operation. Opportunity charging is available at bus stops with overhead chargers utilizing the SAE J3105 standard and at terminals at the end of the bus route. Slower, 50 kW to 175 kW overnight charging at plug-in chargers is utilized too. Sometimes wireless charging pads are utilized, but plug-in stations are more common due to the fact that are faster and more efficient.

Wireless inductive charging with a charging pad under each bus stop and at each stop light was trialed in Korea with the Online electric vehicle project. Commercialization of the technology has not been successful, leading to controversy over the continued public funding of the technology in 2019.

The first solar powered microgrid for charging electric buses in the US is under construction in Montgomery County, MD, and scheduled for completion in fall of 2022.

=== Capacitors ===
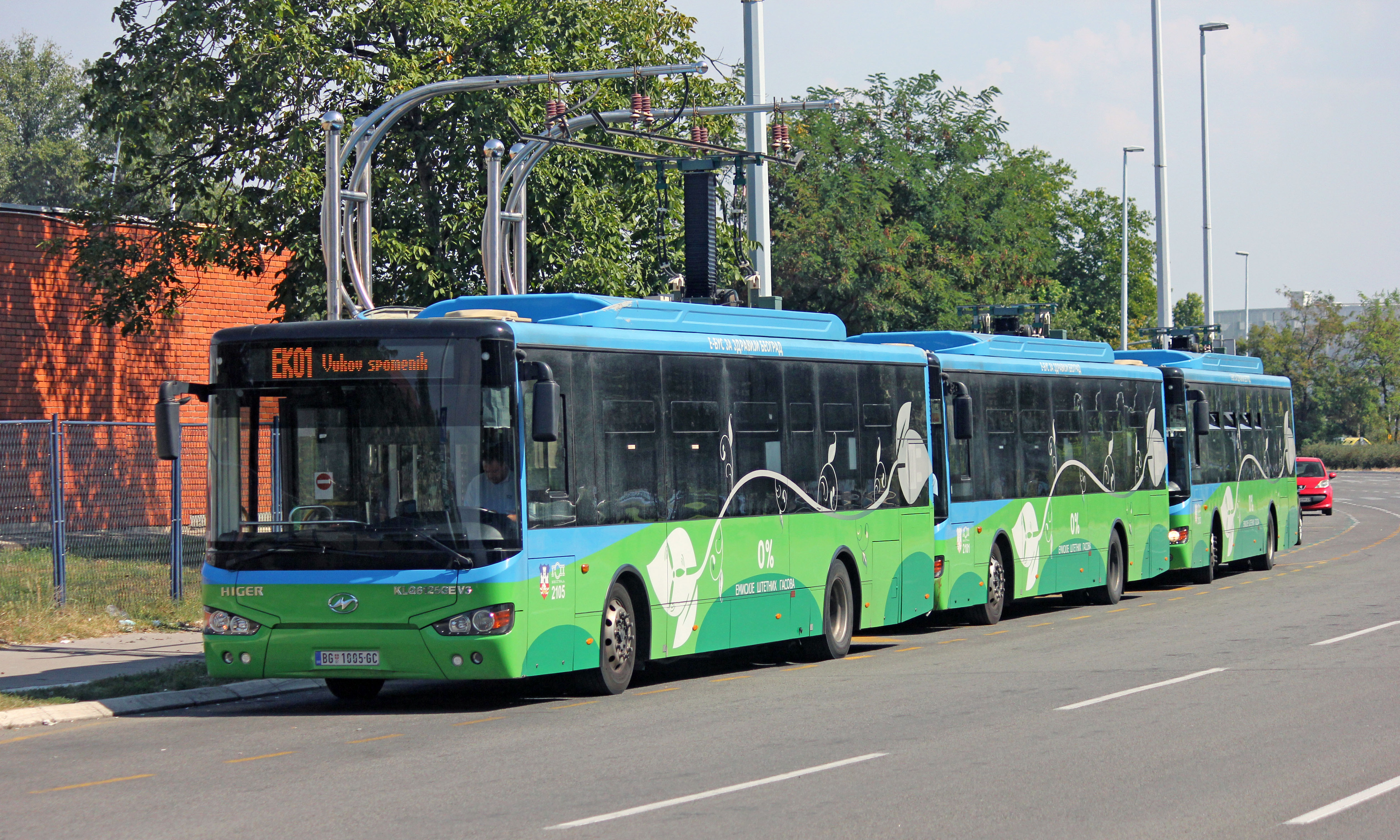
City Transport Company "Belgrade"

Buses can use capacitors instead of batteries to store their energy. Ultracapacitors can only store about 5 percent of the energy that lithium-ion batteries hold for the same weight, limiting them to a short distance per charge. However, ultracapacitors can charge and discharge much more rapidly than conventional batteries. In vehicles that have to stop frequently and predictably as part of normal operation, energy storage based exclusively on ultracapacitors can be a solution.

China is experimenting with a new form of electric bus, known as a capabus, which runs without continuous overhead lines by using power stored in large on-board electric double-layer capacitors, which are quickly recharged whenever the vehicle stops at any bus stop (under so-called electric umbrellas), and fully charged in the terminus.

A few prototypes were being tested in Shanghai in early 2005. In 2006, two commercial bus routes began to use electric double-layer capacitor buses; one of them is route 11 in Shanghai. In 2009, Sinautec Automobile Technologies, based in Arlington, VA, and its Chinese partner, Shanghai Aowei Technology Development Company are testing with 17 forty-one seat Ultracap Buses serving the Greater Shanghai area since 2006 without any major technical problems. Another 60 buses will be delivered early next year with ultracapacitors that supply 10 watt-hours per kilogram.

The buses have very predictable routes and need to stop regularly, every 5 kilometres (3 mi), allowing opportunities for quick recharging. The trick is to turn some bus stops along the route into charging stations. At these stations, a collector on the top of the bus rises and touches an overhead charging line. Within a couple of minutes, the ultracapacitor banks stored under the bus seats are fully charged. The buses can also capture energy from braking, and the company says that recharging stations can be equipped with solar panels. A third generation of the product, will give 32 kilometres (20 mi) of range per charge or better. Such a bus was delivered by Chariot Motors in Sofia, Bulgaria in May 2014 for 9 months' test. It covers 23 km in 2 charges.

Sinautec estimates that one of its buses has one-tenth the energy cost of a diesel bus and can achieve lifetime fuel savings of $200,000. Also, the buses use 40 percent less electricity compared to an electric trolley bus, mainly because they are lighter and have the regenerative braking benefits. The ultracapacitors are made of activated carbon, and have an energy density of six watt-hours per kilogram (for comparison, a high-performance lithium-ion battery can achieve 200 watt-hours per kilogram), but the ultracapacitor bus is also cheaper than lithium-ion battery buses, about 40 percent less expensive, with a far superior reliability rating.

There is also a plug-in hybrid version, which also uses ultracapacitors.

Sinautec is in discussions with MIT's Schindall about developing ultracapacitors of higher energy density using vertically aligned carbon nanotube structures that give the devices more surface area for holding a charge. So far, they are able to get twice the energy density of an existing ultracapacitor, but they are trying to get about five times. This would create an ultracapacitor with one-quarter of the energy density of a lithium-ion battery.

=== Drawbacks ===
As with other electric vehicles, climate control and extremely cold weather will weaken the performance of electric buses. In addition, terrain may pose a challenge to the adoption of electric vehicles that carry stored energy compared to trolleybuses, which draw power from overhead lines. Also, compared to trolleybuses, battery electric buses have lower passenger capacity because the weight of the batteries increases axle loads in jurisdictions where there are legal axle load limits on roads. Even when conditions are favorable, internal combustion engine buses are frequently diesel powered, and diesel is relatively inexpensive per mile. High local utility rates (especially during periods of peak demand) and proprietary charging systems pose barriers to adoption.

Some transit planners and authors question the logic of making an 100% electric fleet a high priority. Diesel-electric hybrid busses usually get about 4mpg. Spread over 50-150 passengers, hybrid busses can be over 10 times as efficient as gas cars. A frequent, fast, and filled transit system is an efficient one. Other system improvements such as BRT, metro rail, vanpool, trolleybuses, traffic calming, and bike lanes may offer greater cuts in emissions per dollar. This concern is likely to diminish as battery technology improves. Some buses have already been upgraded to cheaper and more powerful battery packs.

=== In-motion charging ===
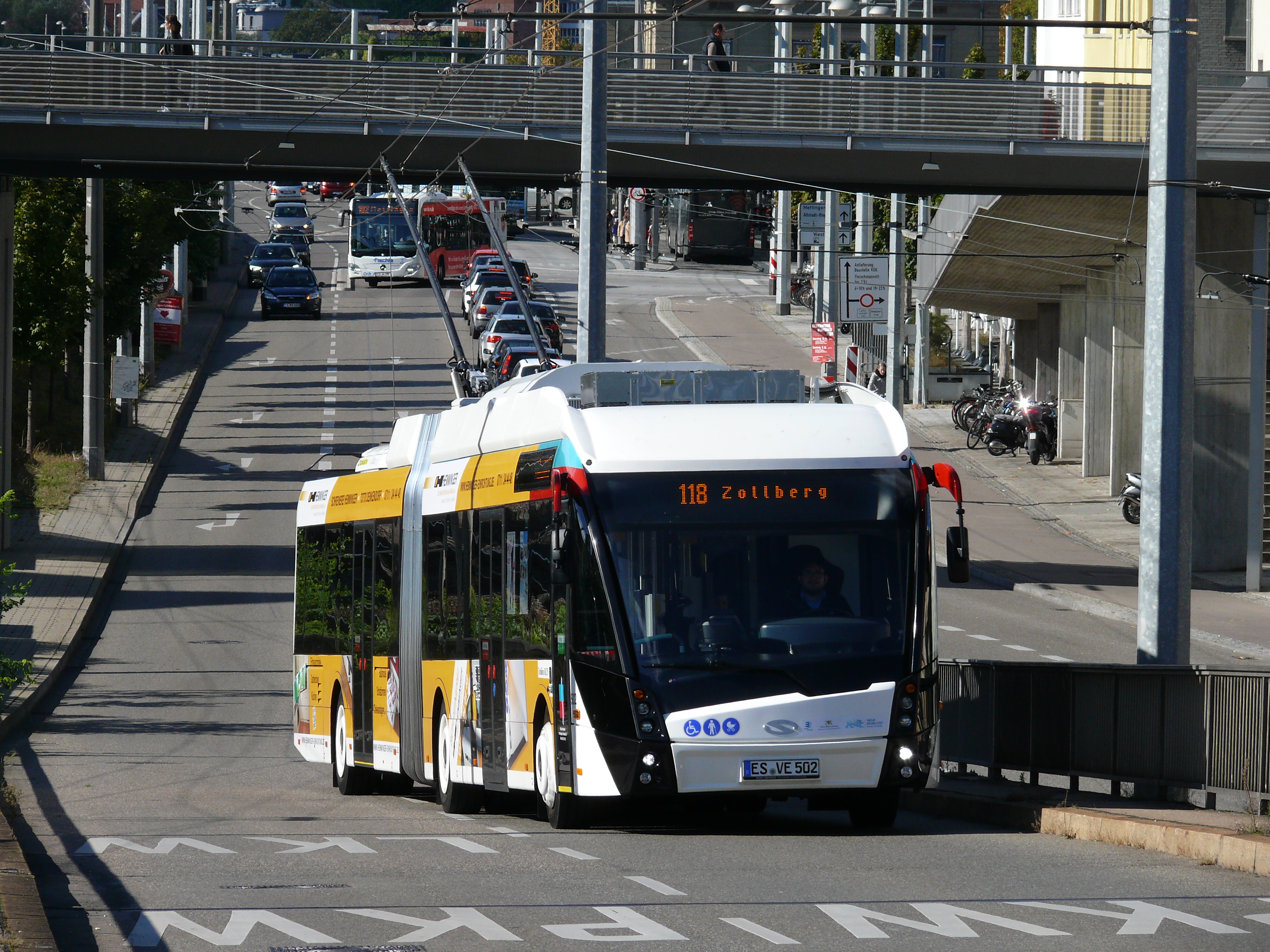
Solaris Trollino with IMC in Esslingen am Neckar, Germany.

Battery electric trolleybuses with In Motion Charging (IMC) technology electric buses that can charge dynamically via an overhead contact network and can run on batteries for up to half of their route. The on-board battery is charged while the vehicle is in motion under the overhead wires and then allows off-wire travel for significant distances, often between 15 to 70 kilometres (9.3 to 43.5 mi).

A study about wireless inductive electric road systems found, using data from BRTdata.org for the year 2025, that a wireless charging lane would not be cost-effective for most bus rapid transit (BRT) systems around the world, with the exception of the ones in Beijing, Xiamen, and Bogotá. Cost-effectiveness requires a combination of high fleet utilization and high traffic density: utilization is given by the ratio of traveling buses to the total available bus fleet, and density is given by the number of traveling buses per mile of bus lane. The study assumes a wireless power transfer efficiency of 90%, installation of the minimal length of wireless charging infrastructure required to meet fleet charging needs, and a fixed cost of $3M per wireless charging infrastructure mile and an additional cost of $10k per kW-mile. This gives, for example, a cost of $4M per mile for a 100 kW wireless charging system, where the 100 kW system is more expensive per mile than a 50 kW or 25 kW system, but requires less miles of charging lanes.

== Makers and models ==
Automobile-manufacturing conglomerates, such as BYD, Yutong, Zhongtong, Hyundai, Higer and Scania produce electric buses.

== School use ==
=== North America ===
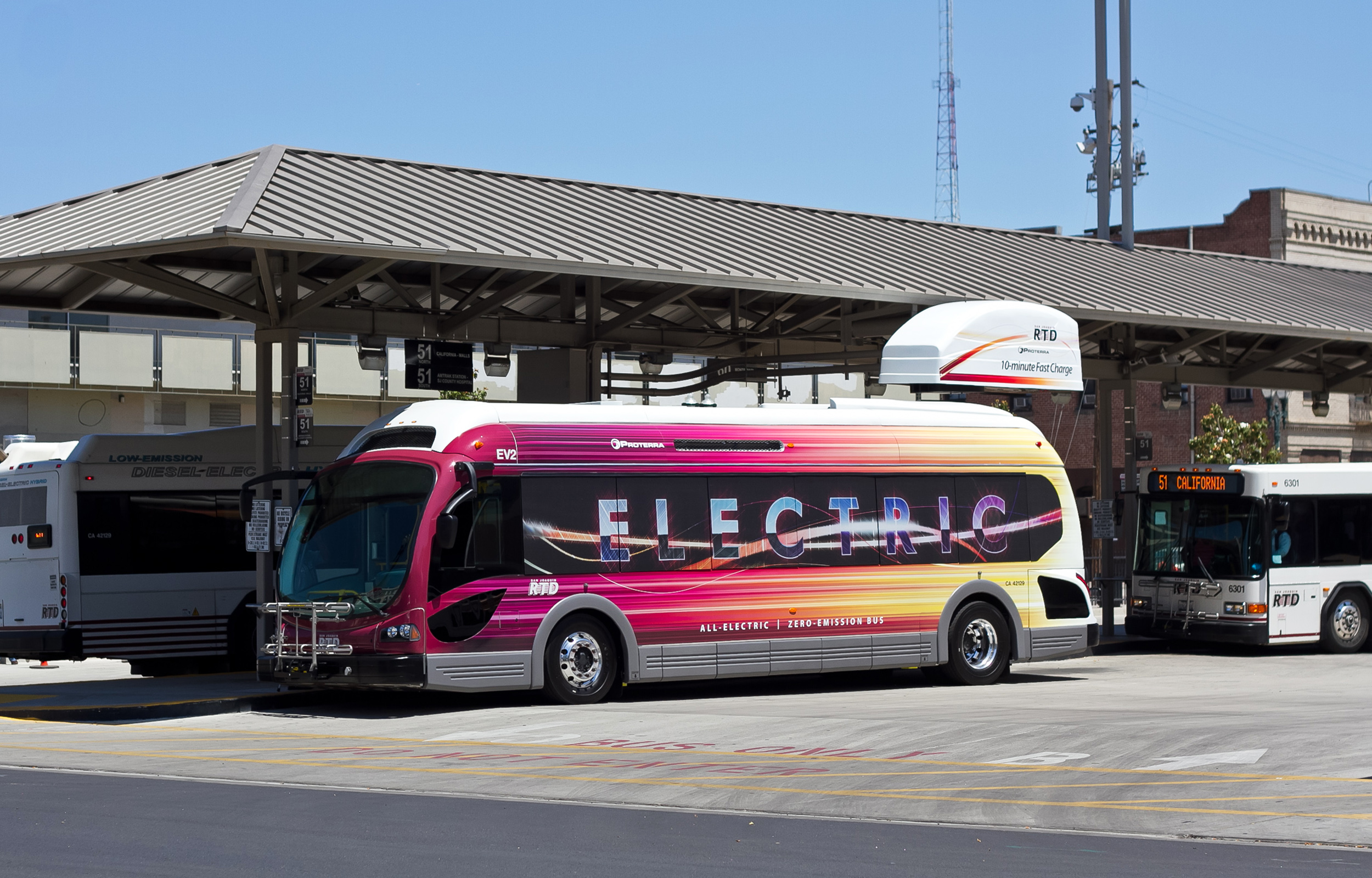
A Proterra BE35 bus operated by San Joaquin RTD beside its fixed charging station

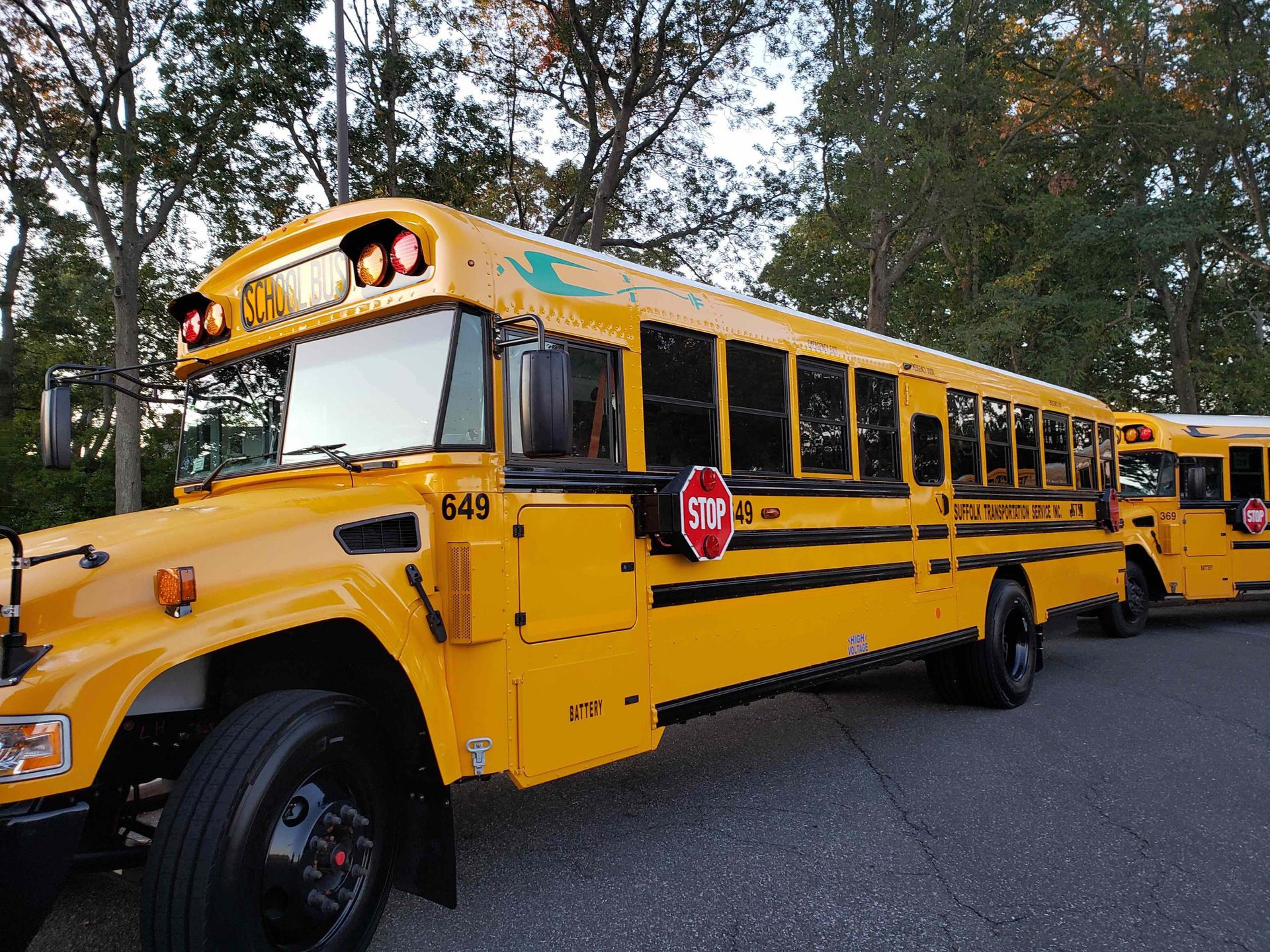
Bay Shore, New York, brand new all-electric Blue Bird school buses.

In 2014, the first production-model all-electric school bus was delivered to the Kings Canyon Unified School District in California's San Joaquin Valley. The Class-A school bus was built by Trans Tech Bus, using an electric powertrain control system developed by Motiv Power Systems, of Foster City, California. The bus was one of four the district ordered. The first round of SST-e buses (as they are called) is partly funded by the AB 118 Air Quality Improvement Program administered by the California Air Resources Board.

The Trans Tech/Motiv vehicle has passed all KCUSD and California Highway Patrol inspections and certifications. Although some diesel hybrids are in use, this is the first modern electric school bus approved for student transportation by any state.

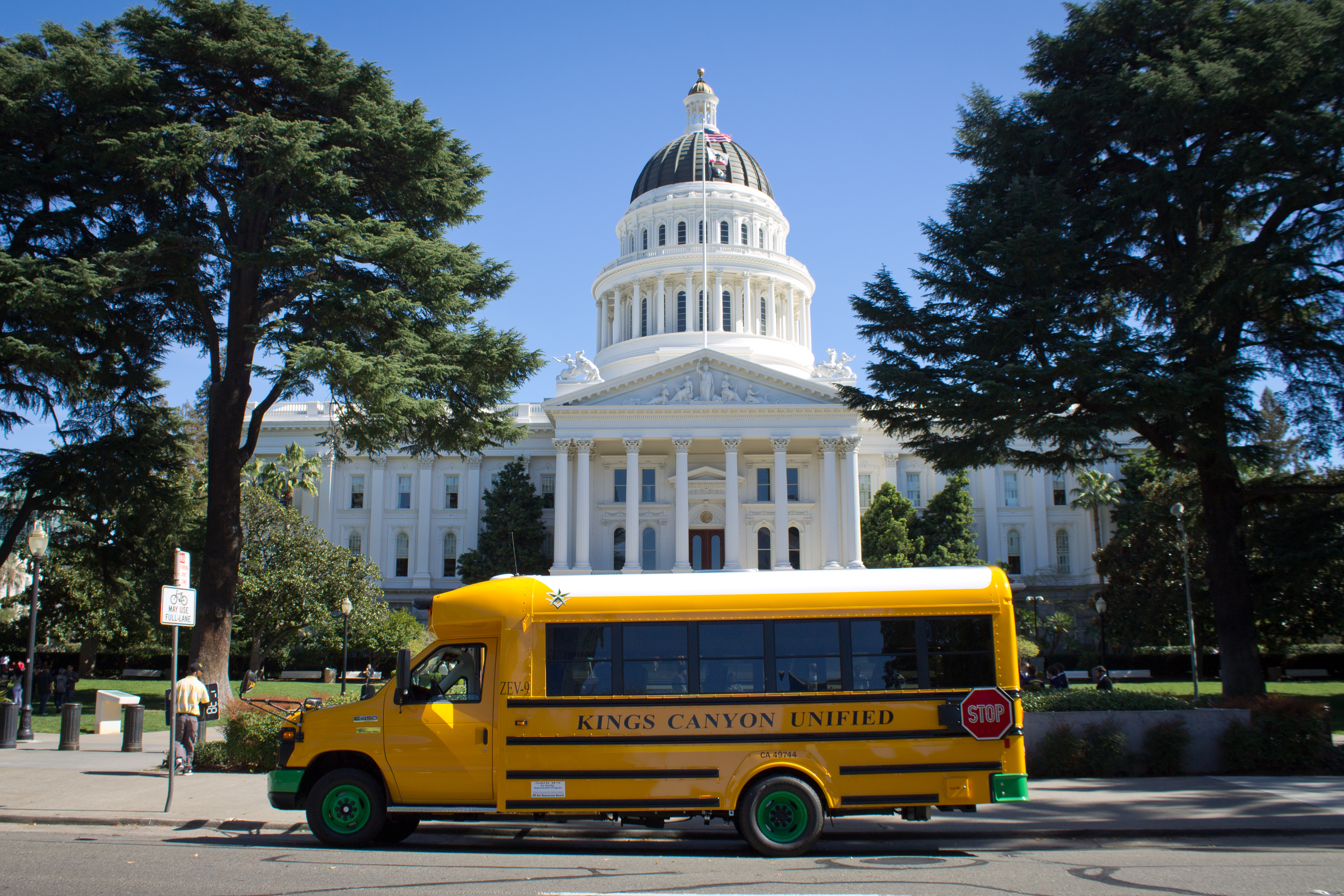
The first all-electric school bus in the state of California at the California capitol building in Sacramento.

Since 2015, the Canadian manufacturer Lion Bus offers a full size school bus, eLion, with a body made out of composites. It is a regular production version that is built and shipped in volume since early 2016, with around 50 units sold until 2017.

In February 2021, there were about 300 electric school buses in operation in the United States. That month, Montgomery County, Maryland approved a contract to transition its 1,400 vehicle school bus fleet to electric buses by 2035, with the first 25 buses arriving in fall 2021.

The 2021 Infrastructure Investment and Jobs Act included $2.5 billion in funding for electric school buses, to be distributed over five years.

By June 2022, 38 US states were using electric school buses. As of July 2023, 909 school districts and private fleet operators across all 50 states plus five tribal nations and territories had received funding for, ordered, taken delivery of, or were already operating electric school buses.

In September 2022, EPA funding for electric school buses was doubled, from $500 million to almost $1 billion, due to high demand. The improvement in air quality over diesel powered school buses is expected to be helpful for children with asthma. In addition, the BIDIRECTIONAL Act was introduced in the US Senate, to "create a program dedicated to deploying electric school buses with bidirectional vehicle-to-grid (V2G) flow capability."

== List of electric buses ==
Transit authorities that use battery buses or other types of all-electric buses, other than trolleybuses:

=== Africa ===
==== Egypt ====
- Alexandria
- Cairo:
  - Cairo Transportation Authority – 170 buses
  - Mowasalat Misr
  - Cairo Bus Rapid Transit
- Sharm El Sheikh

==== Kenya ====
- Nairobi: BasiGo electric buses from BYD

==== Morocco ====
- Marrakesh: BRT Marrakesh – eBRT (electric bus rapid transit as trolleybuses)
- Agadir: Agadir Mobility SA – eBRT (electric bus rapid transit)

==== Rwanda ====
- Kigali: BasiGo same company as Kenya electric buses from BYD

==== South Africa ====
- Cape Town: Golden Arrow Bus Services - 120 electric buses of BYD

=== Asia ===
==== Azerbaijan ====
Baku: Baku Transport Agency (BNA), BYD bus was launched on September 26, 2023, the first electric bus in Baku

==== China ====
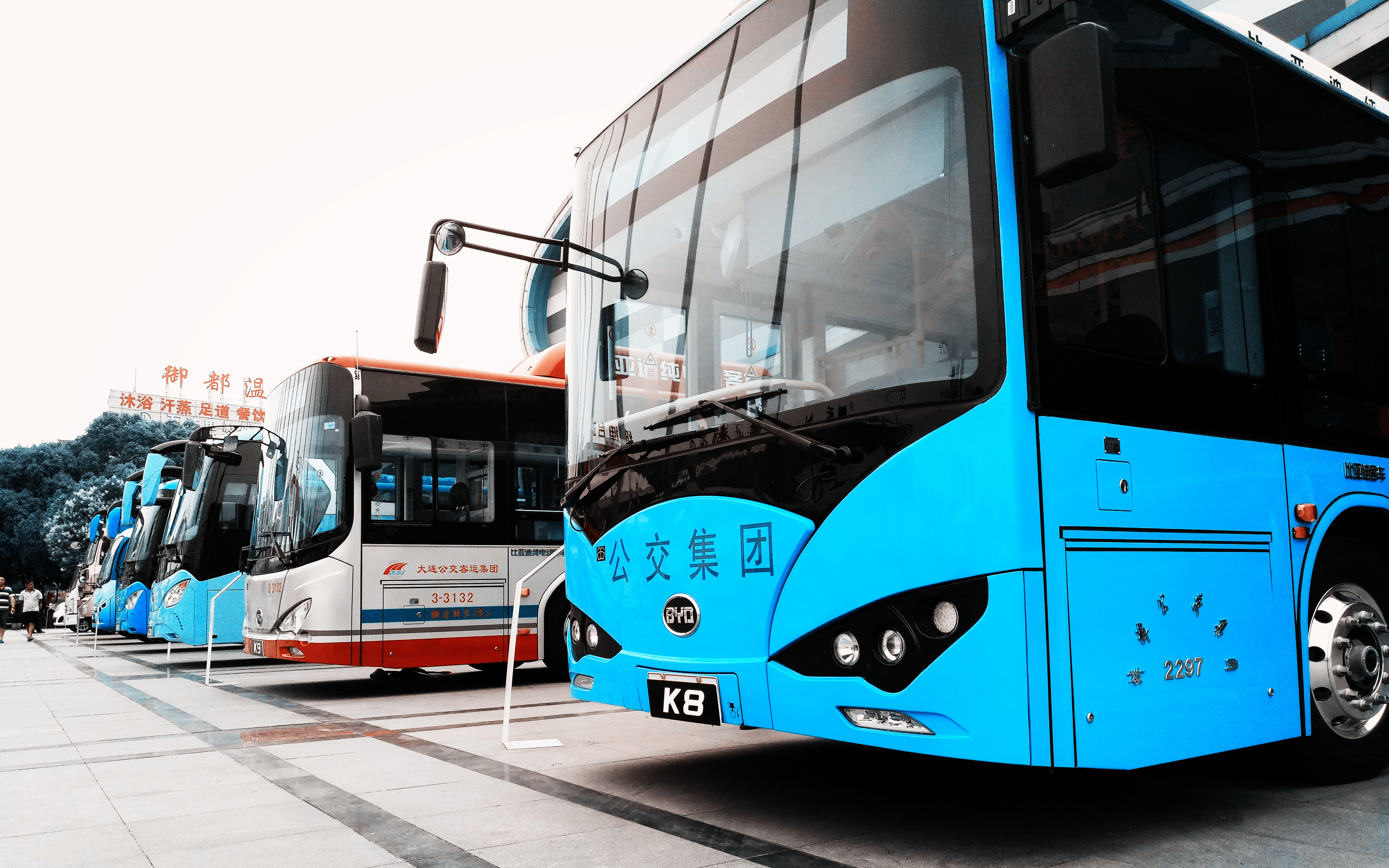
BYD K8A, K9FE, C9, C8, K6, T8SA, T3 in Bengbu, Anhui, China

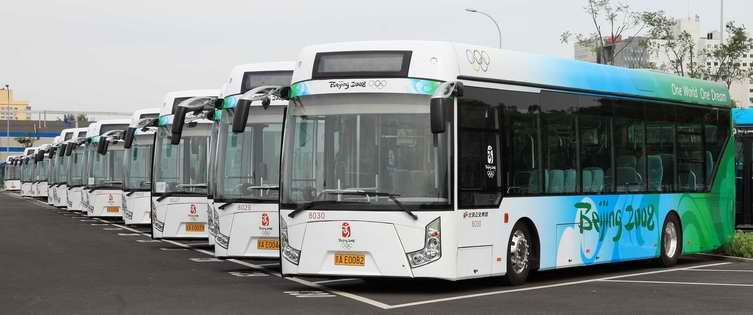
Beijing's electric bus fleet in service during the 2008 Olympics

As of 2016, 156,000 buses are being put into service per year in China. As of the end of 2020, 378,700 electric buses were in operation, accounting for 53.8% of the total amount of buses.

- Beijing
- Bengbu
- Changsha (BYD x 180 vehicles)
- Haikou
- Lhasa, First solar powered public bus in 2015
- Shanghai (capabuses)
- Shaoguan (BYD)
- Shenzhen (BYD x 16,359 vehicles). As of 1 January 2018, every bus in Shenzhen is battery-electric.
- Tianjin (BYD)
- Xi'an (BYD)
- Yancheng
- Bengbu (BYD x 638 vehicles)
- Zhengzhou (Yutong)
- Fujian

==== Indonesia ====
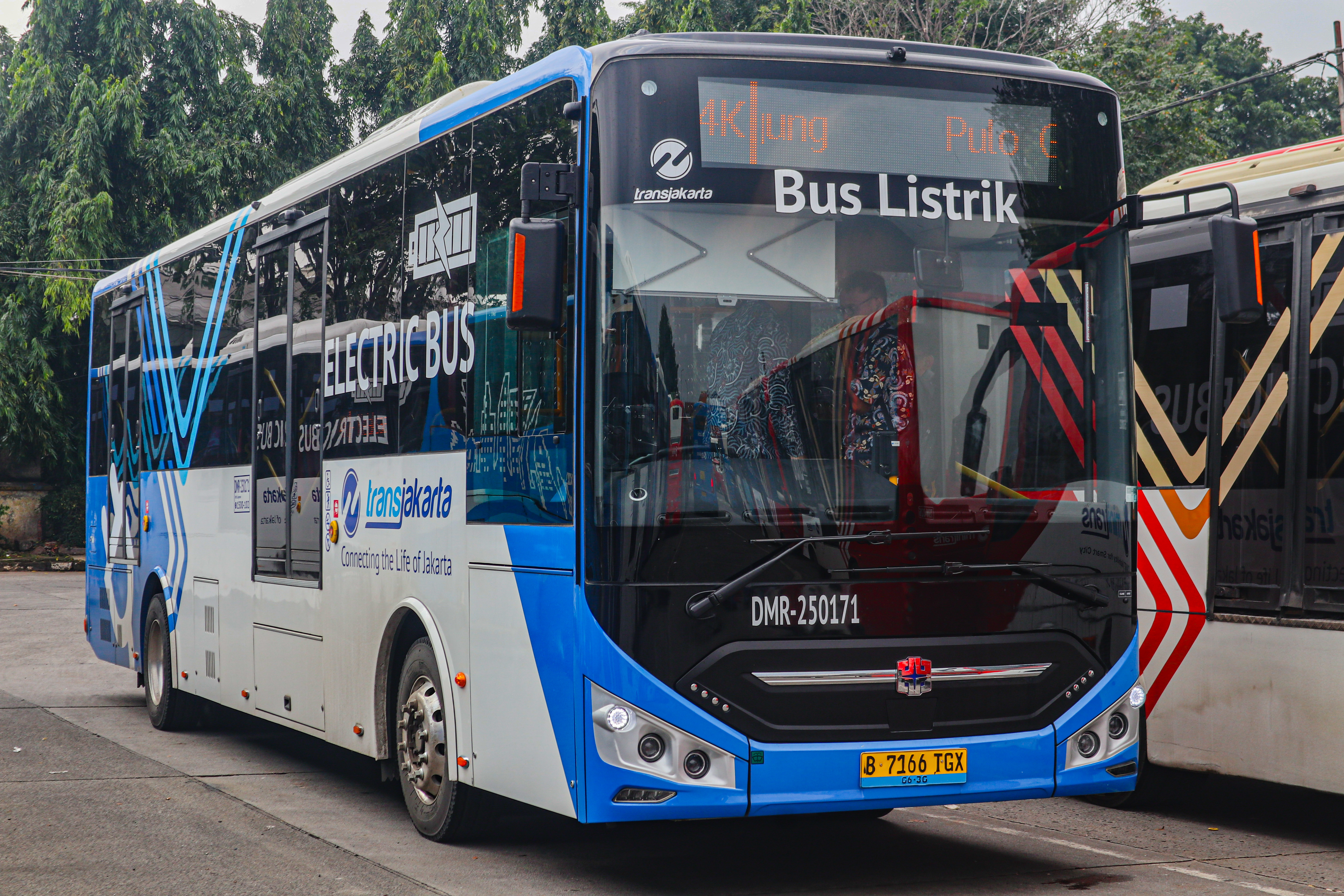
A Zhongtong DMR-250171 electric bus operated by Transjakarta in Jakarta

- Transjakarta plans to replace aging fleet with newer battery electric buses. Available candidates are locally made MAB buses and imported BYD buses. Technical trials started by September 2019. In June 2022, TransJakarta ordered electric buses from three brands: SAG, Zhongtong, and Skywell.
- Paiton Energy took delivery of the first locally produced electric bus made by PT MAB.
- INKA electric bus is used by BRT to Trans Metro Pasundan in Bandung and Trans Semanggi Suroboyo in Surabaya.

==== India ====
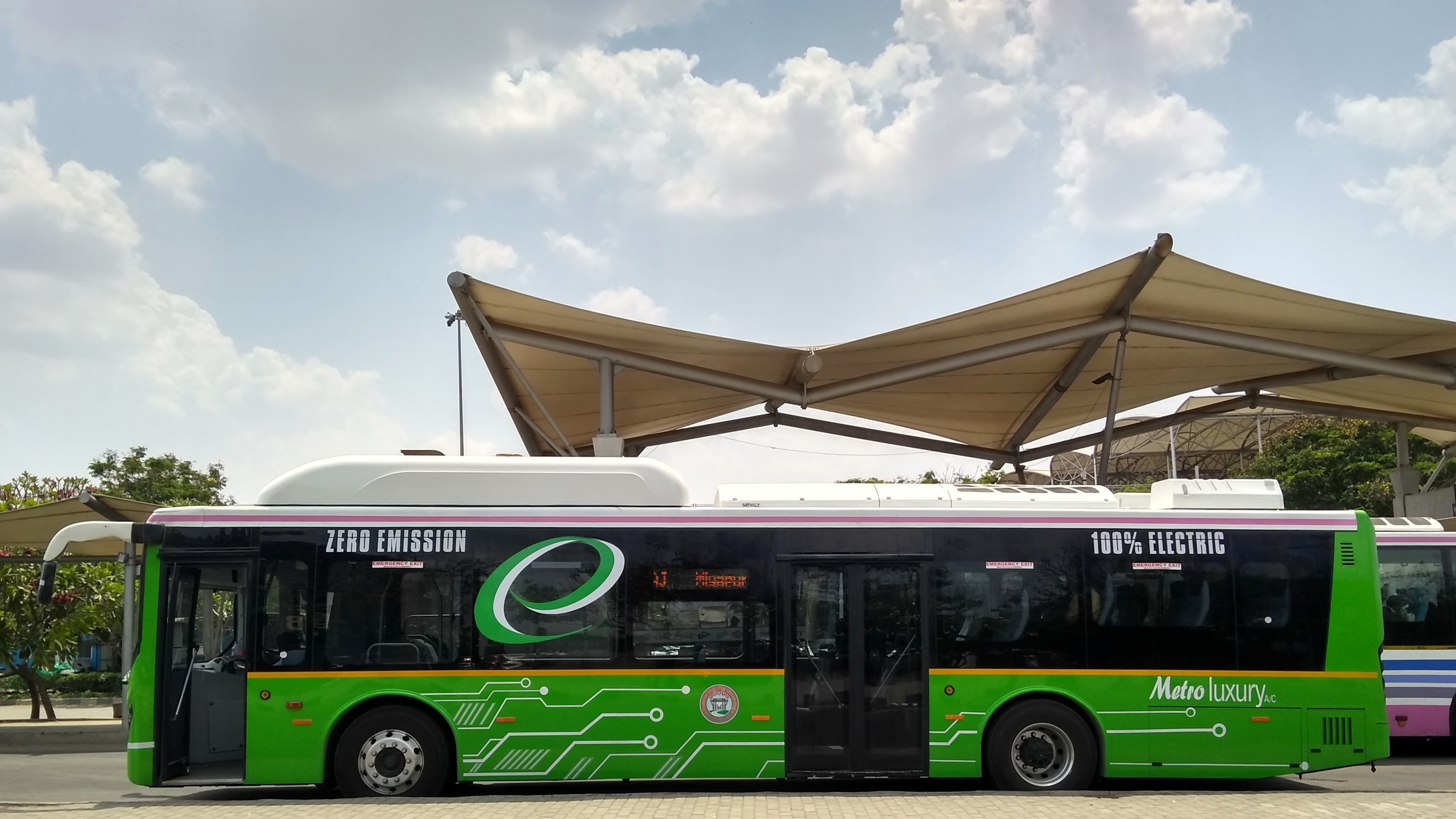
An electric bus in Hyderabad, India

Highlights:

- On 6 March 2014, India's first intra-city e-bus was launched in Bengaluru.
- On 17 October 2016, Ashok Leyland unveiled India's first indigenous e-bus.
- On 8 August 2019, Government of India sanctioned 5,595 e-buses to 64 cities and state transport undertakings.
- On 5 September 2019, India's first inter-city e-bus service, from Mumbai to Pune, was launched.

Cities using electric buses include:

- Ahmedabad, Gujarat
- Bangalore, Karnataka
- Bhubaneswar, Odisha
- Chandigarh
- Cuttack, Odisha
- Delhi NCR
- Hyderabad, Telangana
- Mumbai Metropolitan Region
- Pune, Maharashtra
- Nagpur, Maharashtra
- Kolkata, West Bengal
- Patna, Bihar
- Rajgir, Bihar
- Chennai, Tamil Nadu

==== Iran ====
- Iran's first electric bus was launched in Tehran in 2021 with the brand name of SHETAB. It is the vehicle designed with PLM technology in Iran.

==== Israel ====
- Israel has more than 100 electric buses, out of a fleet of ~13,000 buses.
- Dan, a public transport operator in Tel Aviv, launched e-bus operations on 15 September 2016 with five Chariot ultracapacitor e-buses on Route 4. After 2017, Dan put other four Chariot e-buses with 32 kWh ultracapacitors into service. In late 2018 and 2020, it put 19 and 10 new ultracapacitor e-buses with 40 kWh ultracapacitors into service. By late 2020, 37 Chariot electric buses operated in Tel Aviv.

==== Japan ====
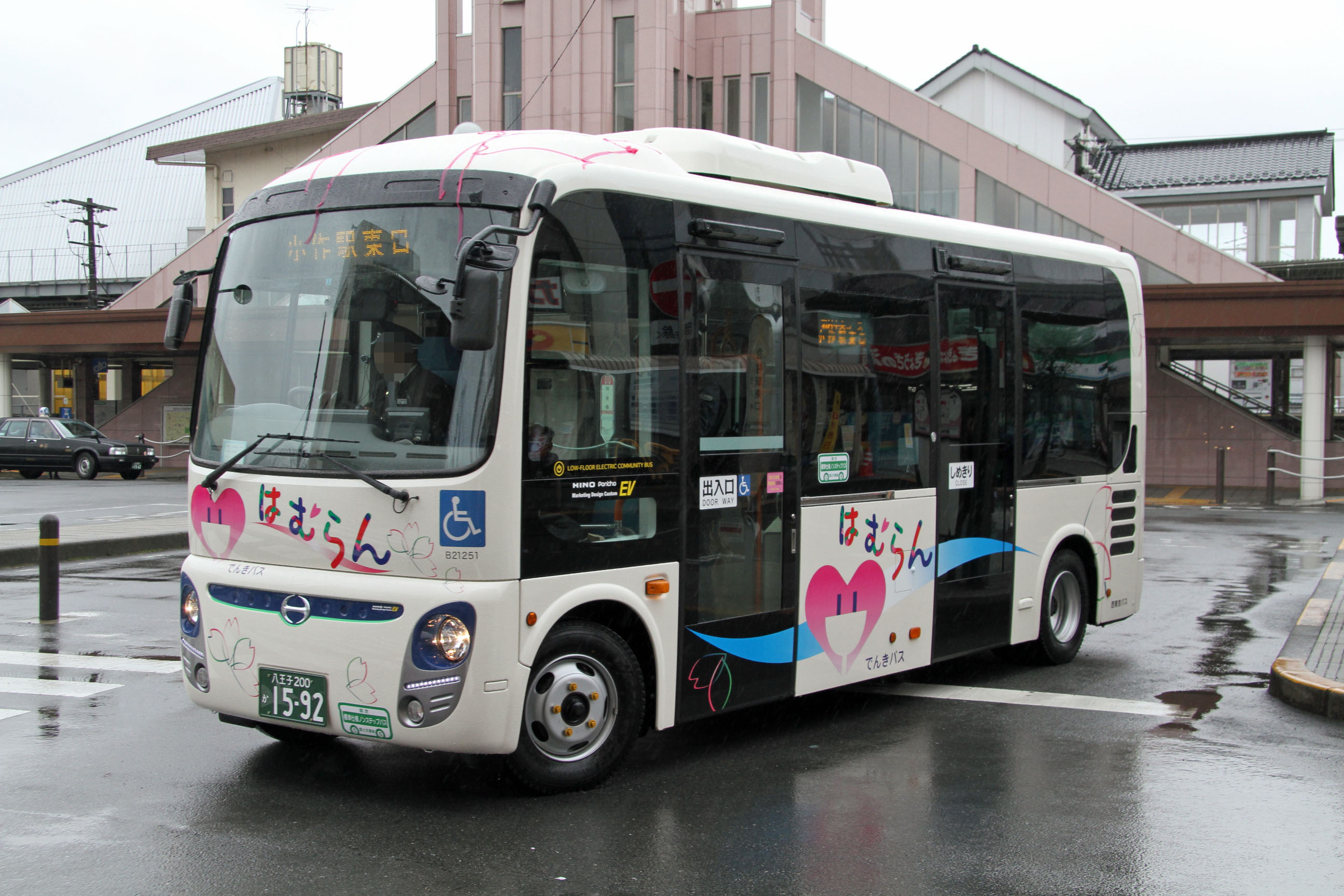
Community Bus "Hamurun"

- Community Bus "Hamurun" (Operated by Nishi Tokyo Bus) in Hamura, Tokyo since 10 March 2012
- Community Bus "Sumida Hyakkei" (Operated by Keisei Bus) in Sumida, Tokyo since 20 March 2012
- Kitakyushu City, Japan.

==== Malaysia ====
- Bandar Sunway
- Kuala Lumpur
- Putrajaya
- Melaka City
- Selangor
- Kota Kinabalu (coming soon 2018)
- Kota Bharu (coming soon 2018)
- Kuching (on trial since 1 March 2019)

==== Pakistan ====
400 Yutong electric buses are in service in Punjab, Pakistan as of October 2025. Trials and feasibility studies was conducted in January 2025. Currently these buses are operating in major cities, Lahore, Rawalpindi, Gujranwala, Multan, Sahiwal, Faisalabad and Mian Wali. Trackless electric Tram in Lahore city is also set to launch in February 2026. Successful on-road trials were completed in July–August 2025. Karachi city is also set to rollout elctric buses citywide.

==== Qatar ====
741 electric buses are operated by Mowasalat (Karwa) the country's public transit system.

==== Singapore ====
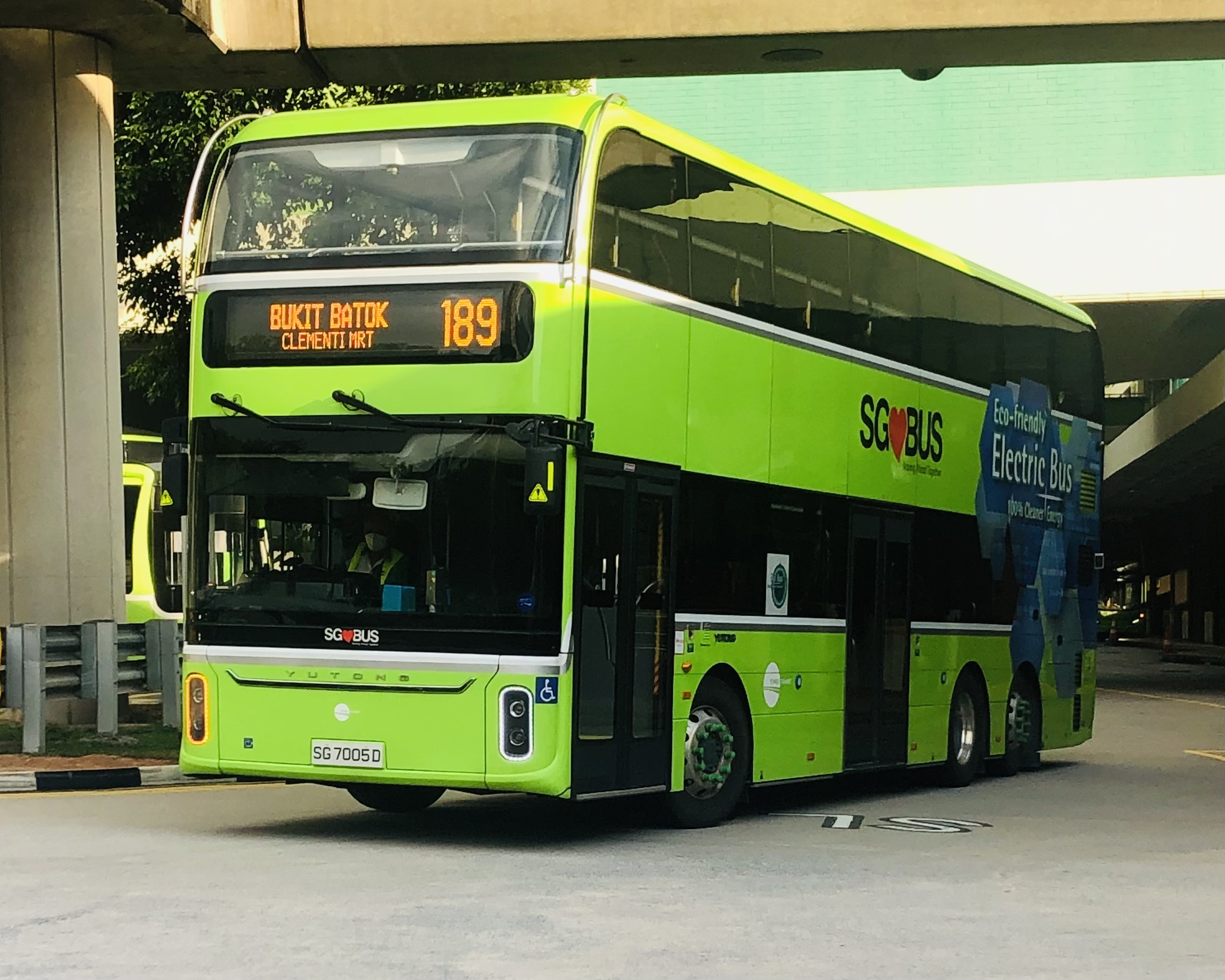
A Yutong ZK6125BEVGS E12DD electric bus operated by Tower Transit Singapore

- On 24 October 2018, the Land Transport Authority procured 60 fully electric buses — 20 BYD K9 buses, 20 ST Engineering-Linkker LM312 Electric Buses, 10 Yutong E12 single-decker buses and 10 Yutong E12DD double-decker buses, for $50.64 million total.
- On 17 October 2019, SMRT Buses began deploying BYD C6 electric minibuses on Bus 825, marking the launch of Singapore's first fully electric public minibuses.
- On 3 April 2020, Go-Ahead Singapore, Tower Transit Singapore and SMRT Buses began deploying Yutong E12 electric buses, marking the start of the rollout of 60 electric buses procured by the Land Transport Authority and the launch of Singapore's first batch of single-decker electric buses.
- On 29 July 2020, SBS Transit began deploying BYD K9 Gemilang-bodied electric buses. EV chargers based at the Seletar Bus Depot (SEDEP).
- On 27 October 2020, Go-Ahead Singapore, Tower Transit Singapore and SMRT Buses began deploying Yutong E12DD electric double-decker buses, marking the launch of Singapore's first batch of double-decker electric buses.
- On 25 August 2021, SBS Transit and SMRT Buses began deploying ST Engineering Linkker LM312 electric buses, marking the launch of Singapore's Opportunity Rail Charging Electric buses for Bedok and Bukit Panjang Bus Interchanges.
- On 25 November 2023, the Land Transport Authority procured 360 electric buses — 240 BYD BC12A04 and 120 Zhongtong N12 buses, for $166.4 million total. On 23 October 2024, LTA's announced that it had exercised this option for procuring more 60 electric buses from BYD Auto.
- In 2025, these BYD and Zhongtong three-door buses have new low-floor design, 2 handicap (with rear-facing foldable seats), and a rear emergency exit hatch window. 300 BYD BC12A04 units and 120 production batch Zhongtong LCK6126EVG N12 units was in total of 420 electric vehicles, were operated by SBS Transit and SMRT Buses. All buses began deployment revenue service debuts. EV chargers were deployed locates an Sengkang West, Gali Batu and East Coast Integrated Bus Depots. latest the next tender of 660 three-door electric buses were procured by Land Transport Authority, Comprising 360 single-deck buses and 300 double-deck buses on 14 March. we also have newer ones that are second production batch of double-decker electric buses. the tender original contract closed on 22 May 2025, in afternoon (4.00pm), but has since been extended on 26 June 2025. These electric buses are began deployment revenue services, will be replace the older diesel buses. All the EV chargers were deployment services. On 15 December 2025, the Mandai Depot & Bus Interchanges use the EV charger stations (installed at Pasir Ris, Beauty World, Kallang & Tampines North) under Contract BD405 & awarded to four Chinese vehicle manufacturers ST Engineering Mobility Service, BYD, Yutong & Cycle and Carriage Automotive Private Limited (partnered with Zhongtong Bus) under Contract PT602.

==== South Korea ====
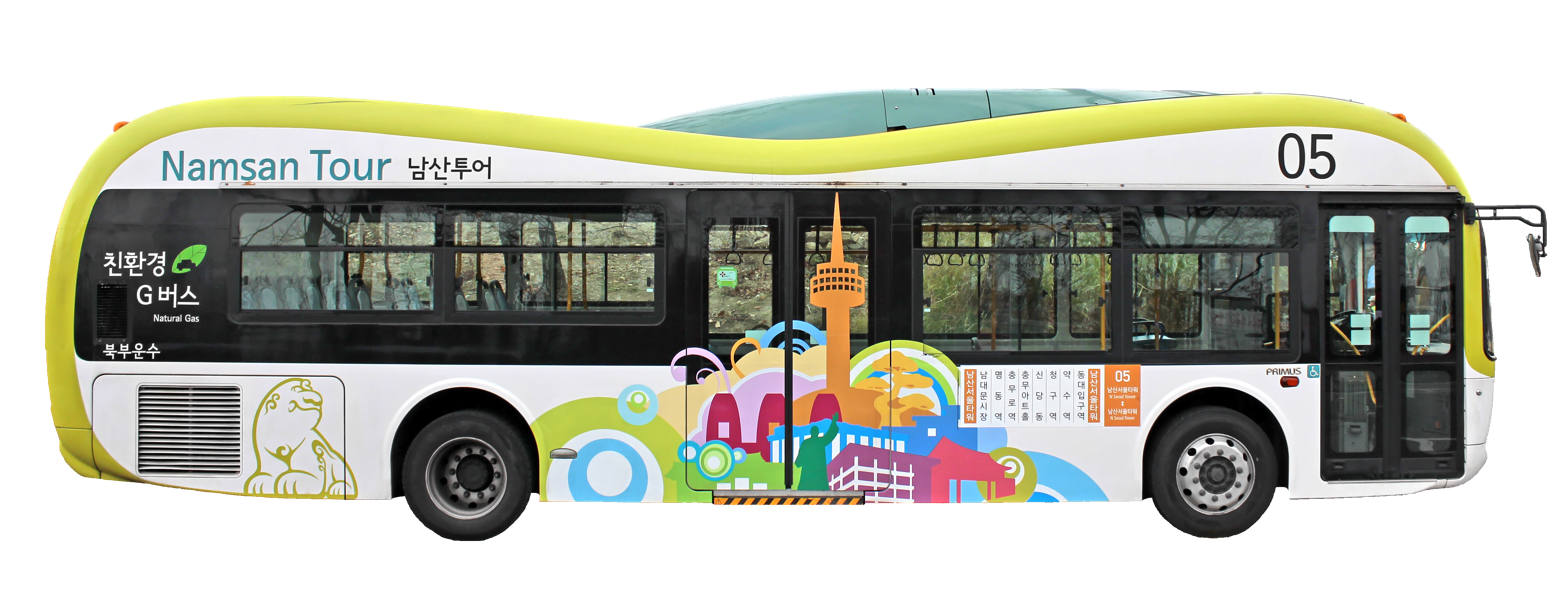
Seoul's "Peanut Bus" at Mt. Namsan.

- Seoul has 15 electric buses nicknamed "Peanut Bus" for their shape, transferring people from subway stations in downtown to the N Seoul Tower, circulating Mt. Namsan.
- Seoul's Gangnam District will have 11 electric buses in operation from February 2013 and 270 electric buses by the end of 2013, increasing to 400 buses by 2014. At least 3,500 electric buses will be introduced in phases until 2020, which will account for half of Seoul's bus fleet.
- Gumi will have the world's first wireless electric bus, known as Online Electric Vehicle, in operation from July 2013 developed by KAIST. Electricity is wirelessly fed into the bus from the tracks.
- Pohang will have automatically battery switching electric buses in operation from July 2013. Unlike conventional plug-in charging buses, the battery pack is automatically swapped with a fully charged one before complete drainage.

==== Thailand ====
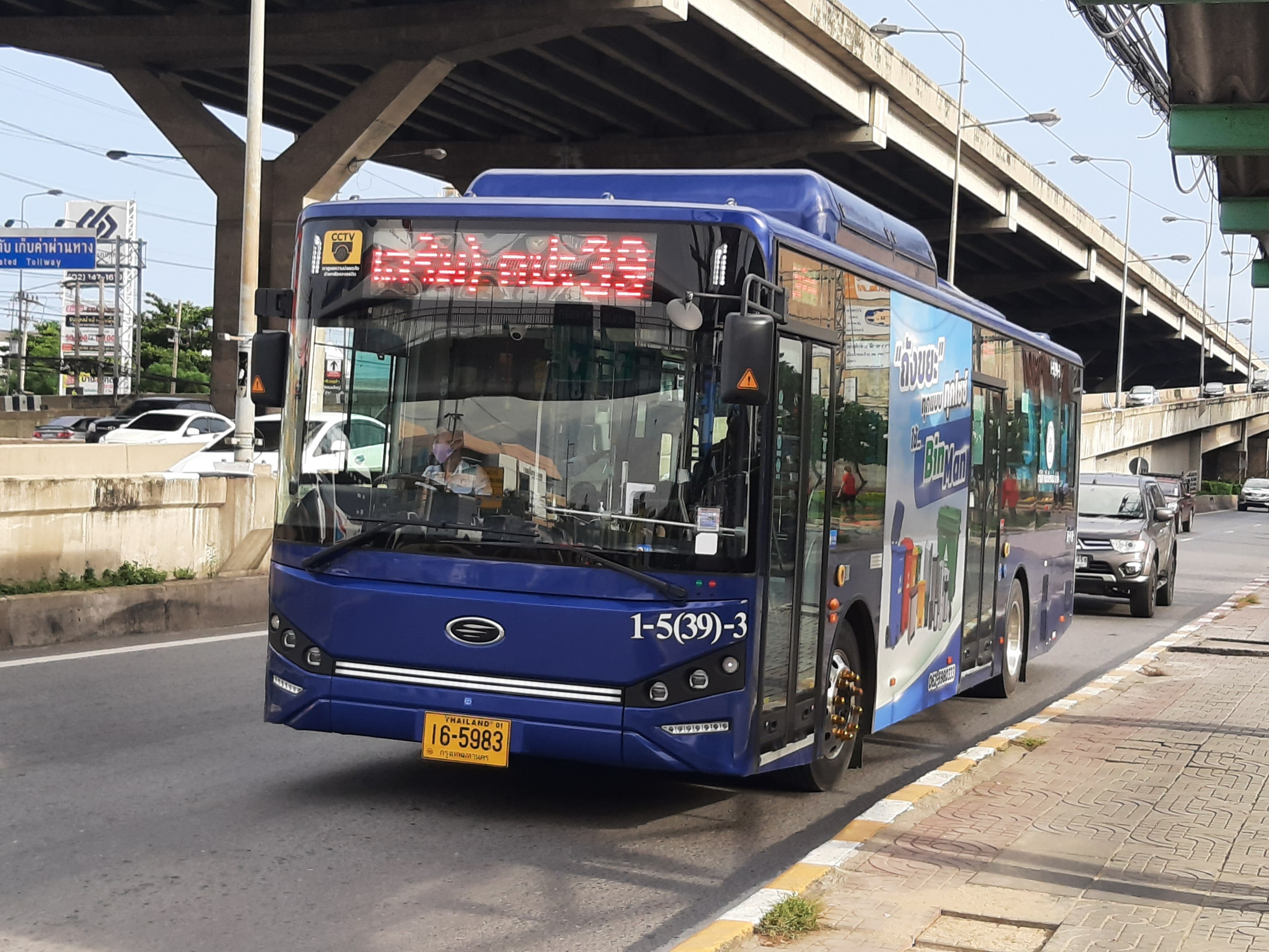
An electric bus in Bangkok, Thailand

- Thai Smile Bus Co., Ltd.

==== Turkey ====
- Anadolu Isuzu
- BMC
- Bozankaya
- Karsan
- Otokar
- Temsa

==== UAE ====
The UAE has recently introduced electric buses. These are public buses which serve Dubai.

==== Vietnam ====
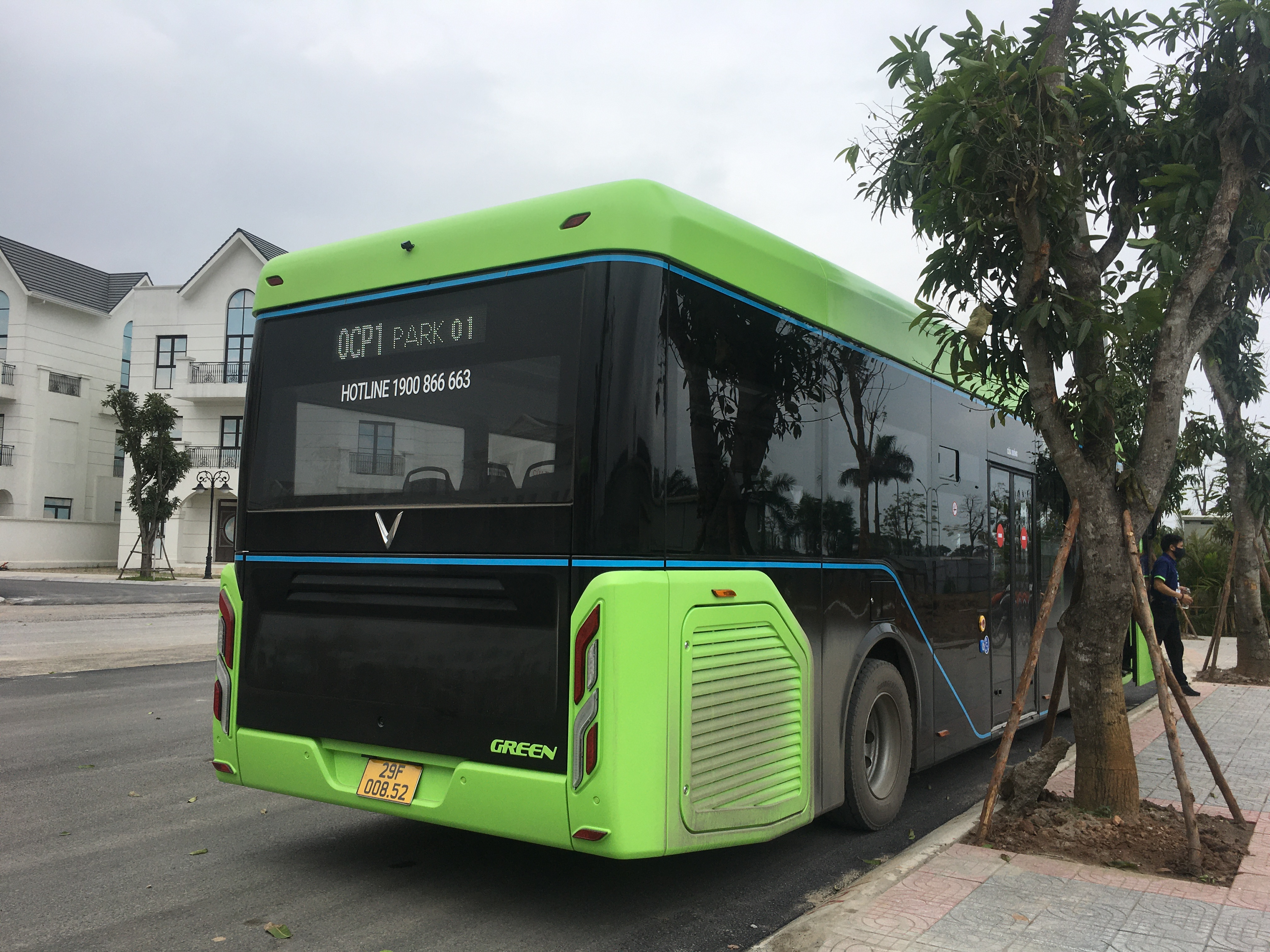
VinBus in Hanoi, Vietnam

- VinBus made by VinFast of Vingroup

=== Europe ===
==== Belarus ====
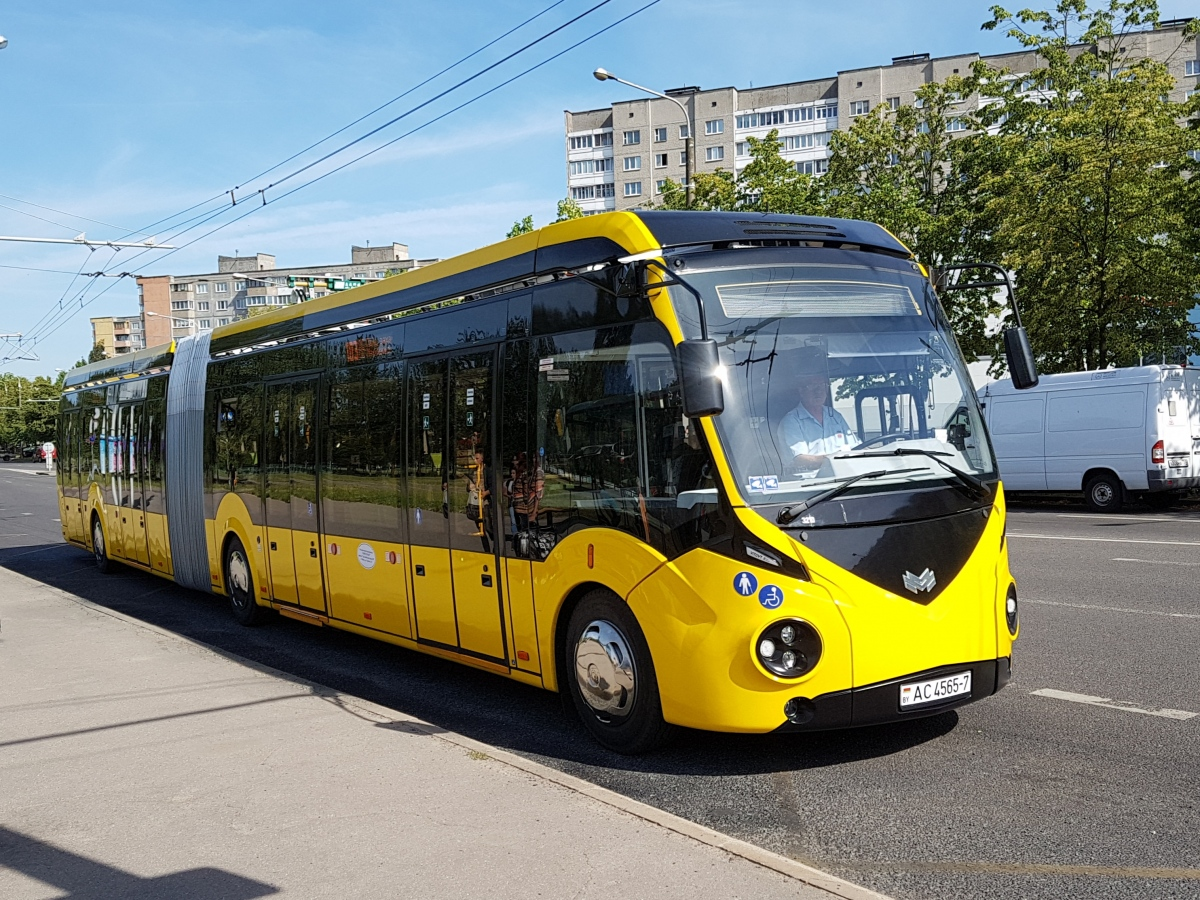
Vitovt Max Electro E-433 in Minsk

- Е433 «Vitovt Max Electro» (Minsk)
- E420
- E321

==== Belgium ====
The electrification of Belgium's buses is on a strong upward trend:

===== Brussels =====
- At the end of 2019 STIB/MIVB operated 800 buses, of which 184 (23%) of them were hybrids. Tenders for 50–100 electric buses are being prepared and the hydrogen option is also being examined.

As for fully electric buses, Belgium only had 4 in operation in 2019.

===== Flanders =====
- At the end of 2019 De Lijn operated 2,295 buses, of which 368 were hybrids. De Lijn introduced its first six fully electric buses in 2020, with seven more to follow. An order for 970 electric buses, which had been cancelled, is to be reissued. The Flemish coalition agreement states that city centres must be operated emission-free by 2025 and that all buses in Flanders must be zero-emission by 2035.

===== Wallonia =====
- At the end of 2019, OTW operated 1,769 of its own buses, of which 309 were hybrids.

==== Bulgaria ====
- Since 2018 Sofia operates a fleet of 20 Yutong battery electric buses
- Since 2020 Sofia operates a fleet of 15 Chariot-Higer supercapacitor-based electric buses. In 2021 the fleet was supplemented by 30 more electric vehicles of this type.
- Since February 2021 Kazanlak operates a fleet of 7 Alfabus battery electric buses
- Since February 2021 Gabrovo operates a fleet of 3 Chariot-Higer supercapacitor-based electric buses, delivered by Chariot Motors.
- Since July 2021 Ruse operates a fleet of 20 SOR battery electric buses.

==== Finland ====
- Helsinki Regional Transport Authority – 436 electric buses (34% of the total)

==== France ====
- RATP (Paris): Line 341 is the first line of 100% electric full-size Bluebuses.

==== Germany ====
- Berlin: Berlin public transport(Berliner Verkehrsbetriebe (BVG)) operator orders 90 new electric buses. It is still unclear which manufacturer the vehicles were ordered from. As the local German newspaper, the Tagesspiegel writes, the order is said to have gone to the Dutch electric bus and charging infrastructure manufacturer Ebusco. The delivery of all buses is scheduled for the end of 2022. This will increase BVG's fleet to 228 electric buses.
- Munich: The Dutch electric bus manufacturer Ebusco has received a follow-up order from public transport operator Stadtwerke München in Germany. The order is for 14 electric 18-metre buses of the type Ebusco 2.2. Delivery is scheduled for the first half of 2023. "After the 12-metre buses from Ebusco met the range expectation, we are looking forward to taking its big brother on the road," says Veit Bodenschatz, managing director and Head of Bus Operations at Münchner Verkehrsgesellschaft (MVG). In Munich, the aforementioned twelve Ebusco 2.2 are already in use as solo buses in the 12-metre version, as well as two Ebusco 3.0, which, as reported, were recently handed over to Stadtwerke.
- Konstanz: Stadtwerke Konstanz has purchased six new electric buses as a prelude to the long-term conversion of its bus fleet. The new Mercedes eCitaro e-buses have already been delivered and are scheduled to enter service on lines 6 and 14 in February. The municipal utility had already announced in October 2020 that it intended to purchase six e-buses in 2021 and to stop buying diesel buses in the future. The order was then placed with Mercedes-Benz last year, and the red-painted eCitaro buses have since arrived in Constance.

==== Italy ====
- Azienda Trasporti Bergamo — Bergamo
- Gruppo Torinese Trasporti — Turin, uses small capacitor vehicles on two routes ("Star1" and "Star2") through city center since early 2000.
- Azienda Trasporti Milanesi, the company responsible for public transportation in Milan, has ordered 250 electric buses in 2019, and plans to be fully electrified by 2030. As of 2019, there are 25 electric buses, 100 hybrid buses and 3 hydrogen buses in operation in the city.

==== Lithuania ====
- Municipal public transport company Klaipėdos autobusų parkas, Klaipėda, started using locally produced Dancer electric buses on Route 8 in April 2020.
- Municipal public transport company Kauno autobusai, Kaunas, operates electric trolleybuses since 1965. As of April 2020, the company operated around 100 Solaris Trollino 12AC and several Berkhof Premier AT18 trolleybuses on a network of 17 lines.
- Municipal public transport company Tauragės autobusų parkas, Tauragė in March 2019 announced the acquisition of electric Iveco Rosero 70C18 and Solaris Urbino Electric buses. A total of 5 electric buses were launched on three suburban routes in early 2020.
- Municipal public transport company Susisiekimo paslaugos, Vilnius, began using four Karsan Jest Electric buses on Route 89 in September 2019, making this route fully electric. This is an addition to the network of 19 routes, operated with 279 electric trolleybuses, mostly Solaris Trollino 15AC, Solaris Trollino IV 12, Škoda 14Tr, Škoda 14ТrМ, Škoda 15Тr and Amber Vilnis 12 AC, as of April 2020. Vilnius trolleybus network was launched in 1956.

==== Netherlands ====
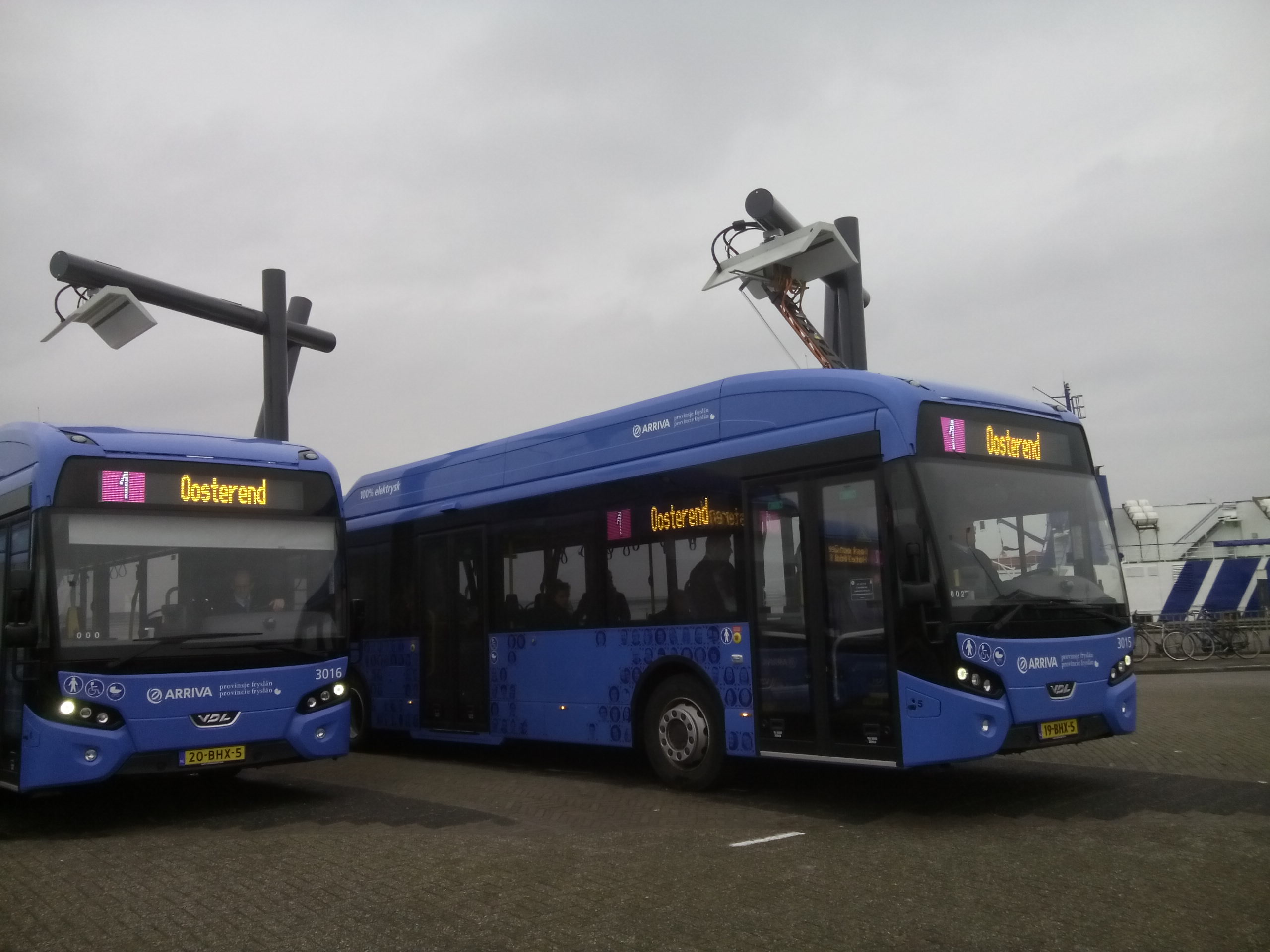
A VDL Citea Electric charging at the bus station of West-Terschelling, Netherlands

The Netherlands has the most electric buses of any European country. At the end of 2019 the number had reached 770, or 15% of the entire Dutch fleet of 5,236 buses. This is expected to grow to 1,388 by the end of 2020. In the provinces of Groningen and Drenthe 47% of buses are electric, in Limburg 37% and in North Holland 31%. The main manufacturers are VDL (486 of the existing 770) Ebusco (110), Heuliez (49) and BYD (44). In 2015, the Dutch public transport authorities agreed to buy only emission-free buses from 2025 onwards, and to make the entire fleet emission-free by 2030.

===== Amsterdam =====
In December 2018 GVB ordered 31 electric buses from VDL, with an option for 69 more buses. They entered service on 2 April 2020 on routes 15, 22 and 36, and are

- 9 Citeas SLF-120 Electric, with 216 kWh batteries
- 22 articulated Citeas SLFA-180 Electric, with 288 kWh batteries

The buses recharge through a pantograph from 31 8 MW Heliox fast chargers at the Garage West depot on Jan Tooropstraat and seven 45 kW chargers at Sloterdijk station. EBS (Egged Bus Systems), which primarily serves Waterland to the north of Amsterdam, has also ordered 10 electric buses from VDL.

===== Arnhem =====
Arnhem has the Netherlands's only trolleybus network, which opened in 1949 and operates 46 articulated buses on six routes.

===== Eindhoven =====
On 11 December 2016 Hermes introduced 43 fully electric VDL 18-metre buses in Eindhoven, driving a daily distance of 400 km each. In 2017 this was the biggest all-electric bus operation of Europe.

===== Haaglanden =====
For use on its Haaglanden network EBS is using 116 electric buses:

- 23 VDL Citea LLE 99 Electrics for Zoetermeer and Delft (10-metre [32 ft 9 3/4 in])
- 93 Mercedes-Benz Citaro NGT Hybrids for other routes (83 12-metre [39 ft 4 1/2 in] and 10 18-metre [59 ft 5/8 in] articulated)

===== Rotterdam =====
In 2018 Rotterdam ordered 55 electric buses from VDL and in 2019 obtained a European Investment Bank loan to buy a further 105 electric and 103 hybrids.

===== Schiphol =====
Since March 2018, 100 VDL Citea articulated electric buses operated by Connexxion have served Schiphol airport. The buses have a battery capacity of 170 kWh and a range of 80 kilometres. They are charged during the day by Heliox 450 kW fast chargers, taking between 15 and 25 minutes. Overnight, 30 kW slow charges take 4–5 hours. They are powered by 100% renewable energy, from wind power and solar panels at the depots. The buses serve two different networks:

- R-net: routes 242, 342, 347 and 347 with a total length of 78 km
- Schipholnet: routes 180, 181, 185, 186, 187, 190, 191, 194, 195, 198, 199 and 287.

Since 2016 a fleet of 35 BYD 12-metre battery buses has provided airfield services.

===== Utrecht =====
In Utrecht, Qbuzz has operated electric buses since 2017.

===== Wadden Islands =====
In April 2013 six all-electric BYD buses operated on the island of Schiermonnikoog. Arriva started running 16 electric buses on Vlieland, Ameland and Schiermonnikoog.

==== Poland ====
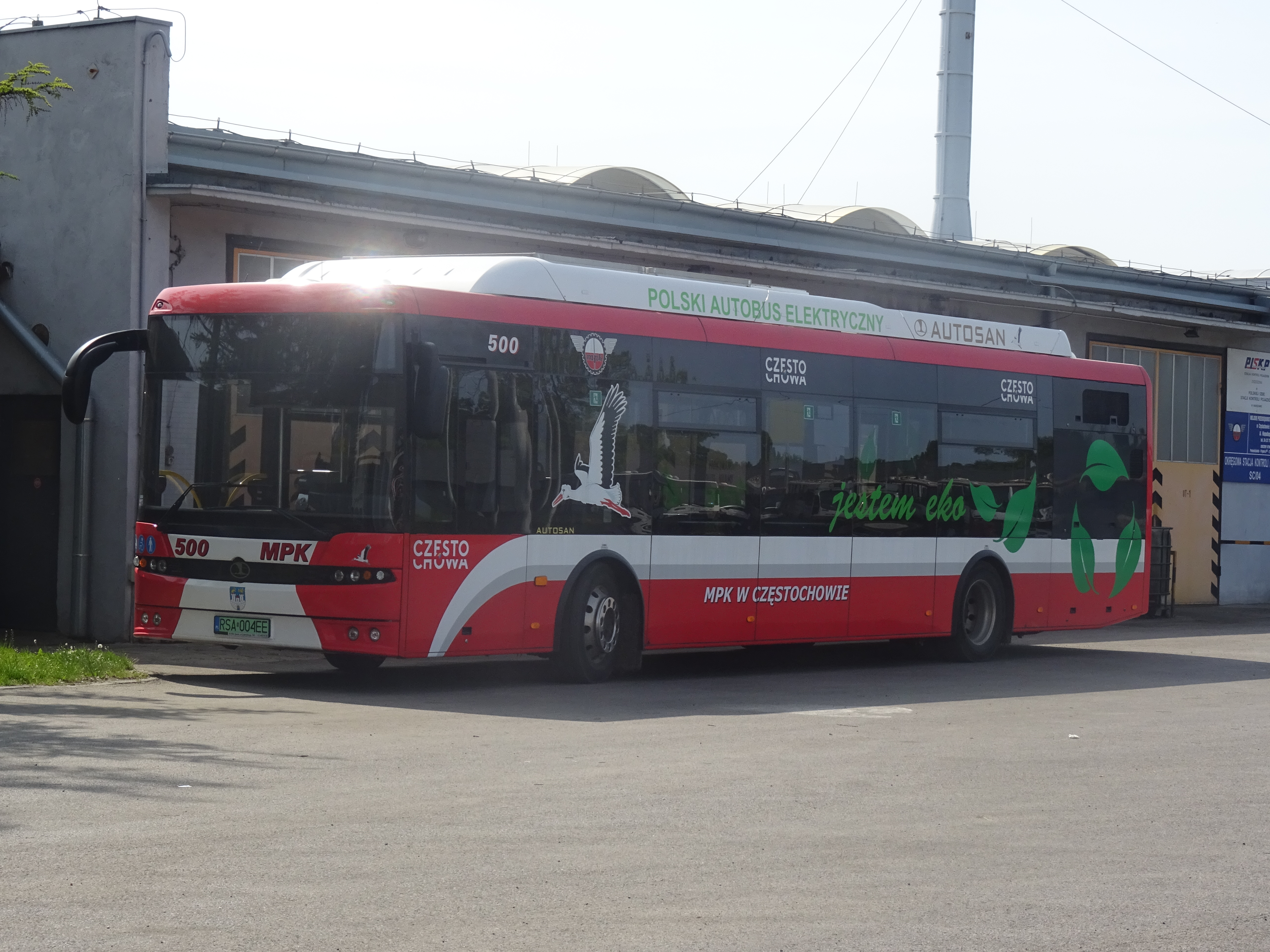
Autosan Sancity 12LFE in Częstochowa

Solaris Urbino 18 electric in Warsaw

- Kraków: In January 2016, first 2 Solaris Urbino 12 electric buses were delivered by Solaris Bus & Coach. In September 2016, further 4 Solaris Urbino 8,9 LE electric buses were delivered by the same manufacturer. A roadside charger was installed at a bus stop on Pawia street.
- Warsaw: In June 2015, Solaris Bus & Coach delivered 10 Solaris Urbino 12 electric buses. They are running on route 222. A further 20 electric buses are on order, first 10, manufactured by Ursus Bus, due to be delivered in summer of 2017 and further 10 Solaris Urbino 12 electrics by end of March 2018. There are also plans to purchase further 130 electric buses by 2020. 19 termini will be equipped with chargers, allowing buses to be topped-up using roof-mounted pantographs.
- Zielona Góra: In October 2017 MZK Zielona Góra order 47 electric buses Ursus City Smile 12E manufactured by Ursus Bus.
- Stalowa Wola: In September 2017 ZMKS Stalowa Wola order 10 electric buses Solaris Urbino 8,9 LE electric manufactured by Solaris Bus & Coach.

As of 2022, around 700 electric buses—not counting trolleybuses—from different manufacturers are operated in Poland, and there are plans to obtain another few hundred. The largest fleets are located in Warsaw (162 buses), Kraków (78 buses), Poznań (59 buses), Jaworzno (44 buses) and Zielona Góra (43 buses). Trolleybuses operate in Gdynia, Lublin and Tychy, with around 250–300 in service.

==== Portugal ====
Porto:

- STCP purchased 15 CaetanoBus e.CityGold in 2018, followed by 5 Zhongtong N12 (LCK6126EVB-2) in 2021, and 48 more of the same model in 2023, which they started service in 2024. The Caetano can be found in service on many bus lines from the Francos depot during rush hour times, due to low autonomy (rarely can be seen during service throughout the day, depending on the battery usage), the 5 2021 Zhongtong are uncommon on some services during the day, also from the Francos depot, and the 48 from 2023 can be seen regularly on many bus lines from the Via Norte depot, and these versions are equipped with camera mirrors, top view driving control, and were the first ones to be equipped with a new SAE system for STCP, which later applied onto the remaining bus fleet.
  - This bus company will receive 8 Zhongtong minibuses, plus 20 buses under a collaboration between CaetanoBus and CRRC, to enter service during the year of 2025. It is also planned for purchase 22 electric double-decker buses for 2028.
- Vianorbus, a bus group in service for the first area lot Unir, with the help from Viação Alvorada (bus company in service for Carris Metropolitana in Lisbon) provided many of their Zhongtong N12 for their regular bus service for Maia.
- NEX Continental/Alsa Porto, in service for the second area lot for Unir, has two second hand Irizar i2e buses, formerly buses from TMB Barcelona, in service, plus some Yutong ICE12 and E9-A (ZK6890B EVG). These buses are provided for the company by Auto Viação Feirense.
- Auto Viação Feirense, in service for the fourth area lot for Unir, has a fre Yutong ICE12 for intercity service, and dozens of the E9-A midibuses

Lisbon:

- CCFL Carris purchased in 2019 15 of their CaetanoBus e.CityGold for their fleet renovation. 20 more entered service gradually since 2023, along with 15 Karsan e-Jest.
- For Carris Metropolitana, many bus companies for their area lots purchased two batches of Zhongtong N12 and CaetanoBus e.CityGold for their regular service. Alsa Todi Metropolitana de Lisboa (Alsa/NEX Continental Setúbal), provided by Auto Viação Feirense, has a variety of Yutong electric buses in service, such as the E12LF, U12, ICE12 and E9-A. In 2020, before Scotturb became Viação Alvorada with Vimeca Transportes, has a CaetanoBus e.CityGold on their fleet, numbered 300.

Guimarães:

- Guimabus, bus company belonging to Vale do Ave, have 21 Irizar iebus and 5 Karsan Jest Electric.

==== Romania ====
- Cluj-Napoca: In May 2018, Solaris Bus & Coach delivered 11 Solaris Urbino 12 electric buses to the local operator CTP Cluj, Cluj-Napoca becoming the first city in Romania to use battery-electric buses in public transport. (Electric buses in the form of trolleybuses were already in use in Cluj and several other Romanian cities.) Another 19 buses are expected to be delivered in the future. The municipality's mayor, Emil Boc, announced that Cluj will have a fully electric public transport system by 2025.
- Brașov: In 2019 -2021, SOR delivered 60 electric buses ENS12 and EBN8 to Brasov. Also in 2022, Karsan delivered 12 articulated buses type E-ATA18.
- Iași: Solaris delivered in 2022 20 Solaris Urbino 12 Electric.
- Slatina: Operates since 2022 a fleet of 8 SOR ENS 12 and 10 Karsan E-ATA 10.
- Craiova: Operates since 2020, 20 Solaris Urbino 18 electric buses.
- Turda: Operates since late 2019 a fleet of 20 SOR electric buses, 10 SOR EBN 11 and 10 SOR EBN 9.5.
- Alba Iulia: Operates 13 SOR ENS 12 electric buses since 2023.
- Ploiești: Operates 9 SOR ENS 12 since 2023.
- Suceava: Operates both 15 Solaris Urbino 12 Electric and 25 ZTE City Roamer.
- Zalău: Operates 10 SOR ENS 12 and 10 SOR EBN 9.5 since 2020.
- Pitești: Operates 40 Solaris Urbino 12 Electric.
- Drobeta-Turnu Severin: is operating 6 SOR EBN 11 electric and 3 ZTE GRANTON.
- Constanța: Operates 20 BYD K9U electric buses.
- Bistrița: Operates 10 SOR EBN 9.5 electric buses.
- Buzău: Operates 4 Temsa Avenue Electron 12 and 9 BYD K9U Electric Buses.
- Arad: Operates 10 Temsa electric buses, 5 Temsa Avenue Electron 12 and 5 Temsa MD9 LE.
- Sibiu: Operates 5 Karsan Jest Minibuses and 9 Solaris Urbino 12 Electric.
- Mangalia: Operates 10 Karsan E-ATAK 8.5 meters.
- Focșani: is operating 7 Karsan Jest Electric and 9 Karsan E-ATAK.
- Timișoara: Operates 40 Karsan E-ATA 18.
- Rovinari: Operates 3 SOR EBN8.
- Segarcea: Operates 3 Karsan E-ATAK.
- Galați: will operate 20 Solaris Urbino 12 and 20 Solaris Urbino 9.5.

In Romania, except for the cities above, are operating more than 350 electric buses all over Romania, and their number is expanding. Most of the electric buses in Romania are delivered by: Solaris (Poland), SOR (Czech Republic), Karsan (Turkey), Temsa (Turkey), BYD (China), ZTE Bus in cooperation with BMC Trucks and Bus (Romania). The list above is incomplete, as more tenders for electric buses are being launched, and more buses and models continue to appear.

==== Russia ====
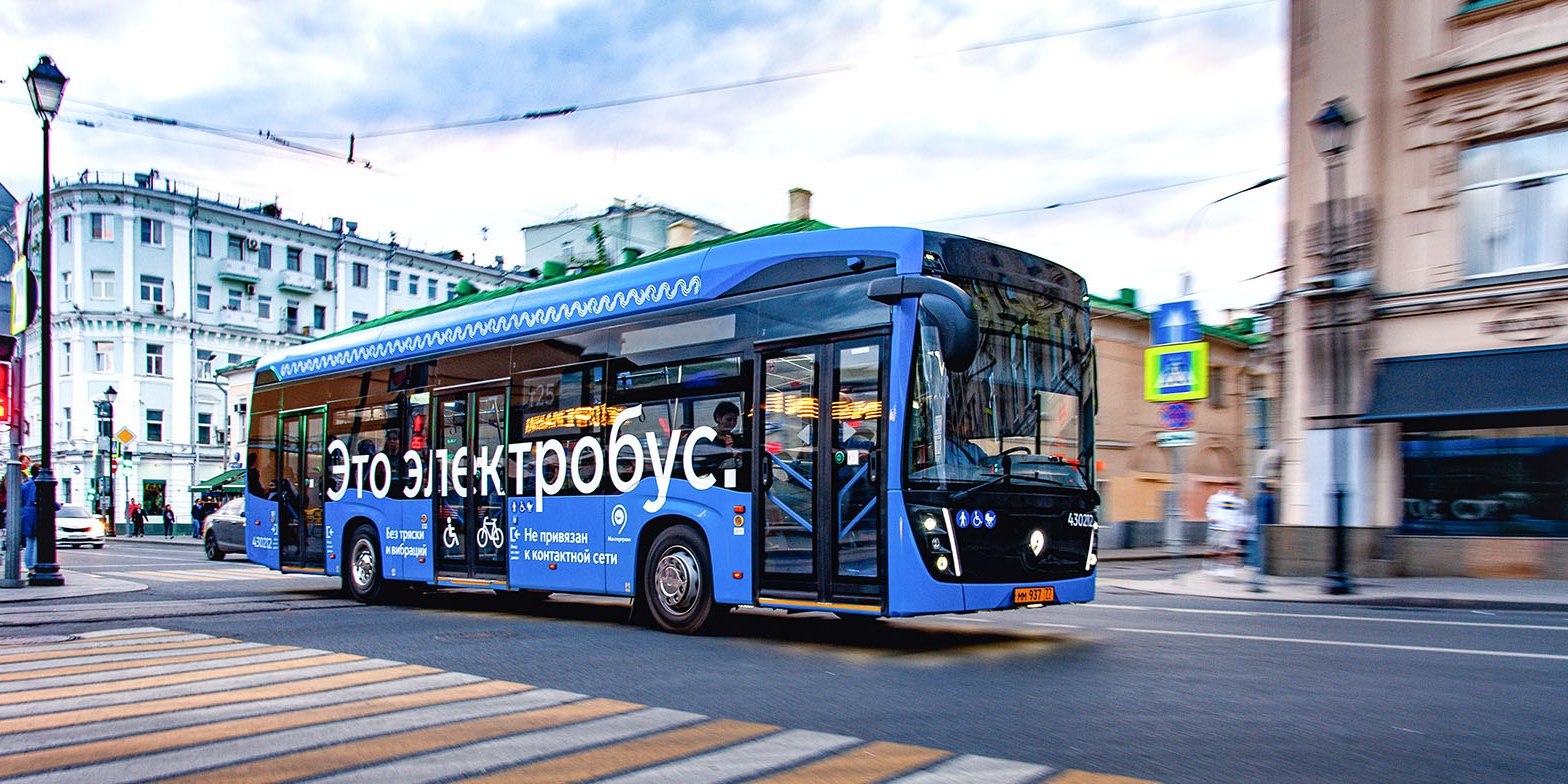
A Russian electric bus KamAZ-6282 on route in Moscow.

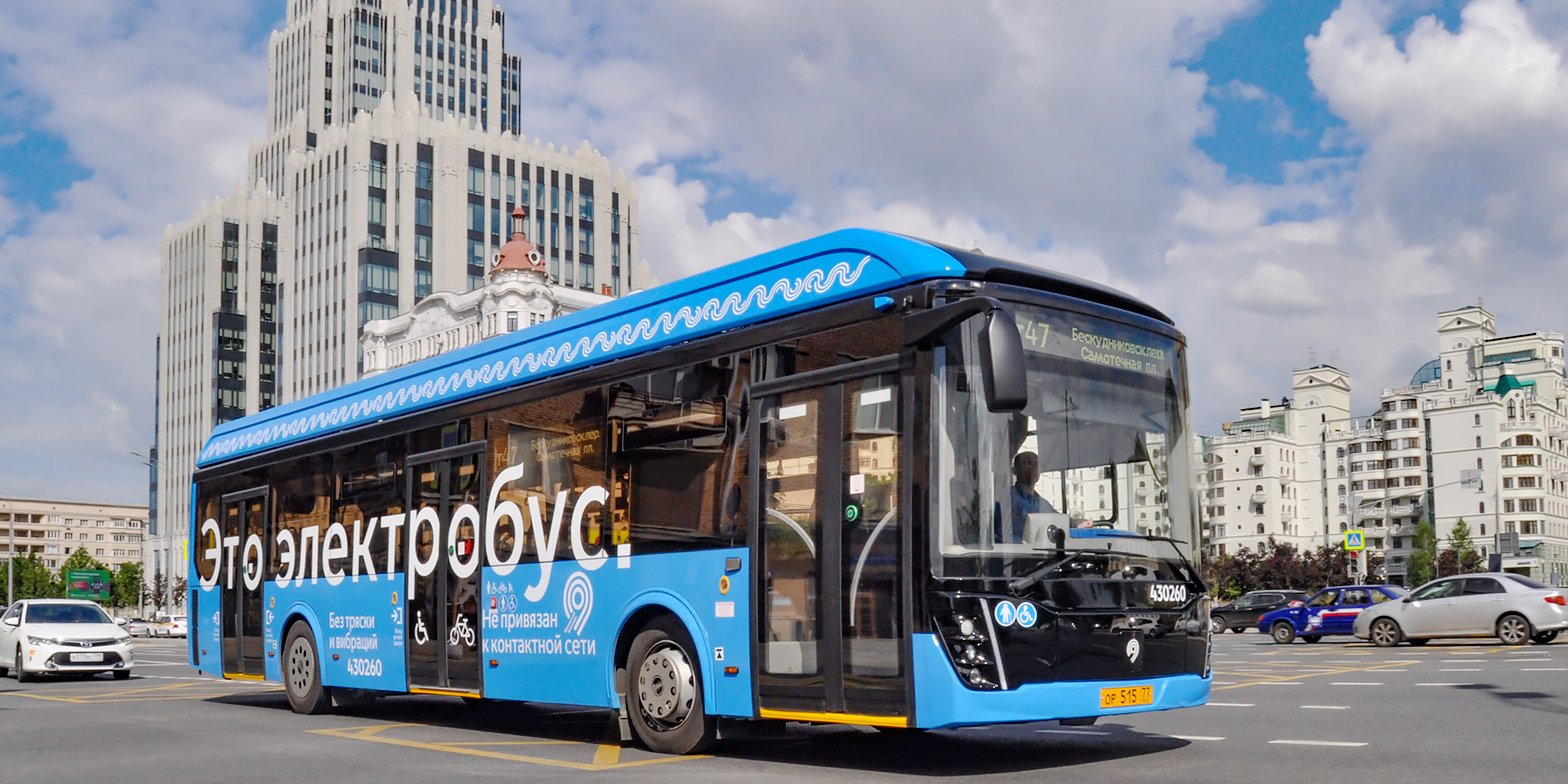
LiAZ-6274 is another common model in Moscow electric bus fleet.

- In 2014 battery-powered trolleybuses started operating in Chelyabinsk. The remodeled vehicles can run up to 30 km on routes that lack wires.
- In 2018 electric buses were introduced in Moscow. The city government has signed contracts with GAZ and Kamaz automobile companies to supply the city with 200 fast-charging electric buses. After 2021, only electric vehicles are to be purchased. With the purchase of the 100th electric bus in May 2019, Moscow became the city with Europe's largest electric bus fleet. As of March 2022, over 1000 electric buses are in operation in Moscow. Drive Electro company had provided batteries for 400 out of those 600 electric busses.
- Russian based Electric bus manufactures are LiAZ (GAZ Group), Trolza (PC Transport Systems) and Kamaz.

==== Serbia ====
- In 2016 GSP Belgrade, the public transport operator of city of Belgrade, launched dedicated electric bus line equipped exclusively with 5 electric buses, delivered by Chariot Motors. The line has a total length of 7.9 kilometres one-way and 13 bus stops.
- In 2022, the Belgrade public transport operator GSP Beograd put its 10 new Chariot e-buses into commercial operation, delivered by Chariot Motors and DAT holding.

==== Spain ====
- Málaga: Malaga Transport Company SAM (EMT), S.A.M
- Madrid: Empresa Municipal de Transportes de Madrid 20 all-electric and 20 hybrid diesel-electric buses and since February 2017 one Iziar ie2.
- Figueres: Councillor for the Environment
- León: Minibus Tecnobus Gulliver in El Ejido
- Seville

==== Sweden ====
- Västtrafik: is running 10 electric Volvo buses in Gothenburg on route 55
- VL: is running a fleet of electric Solaris buses in Västerås on route 1 to 7

==== Switzerland ====
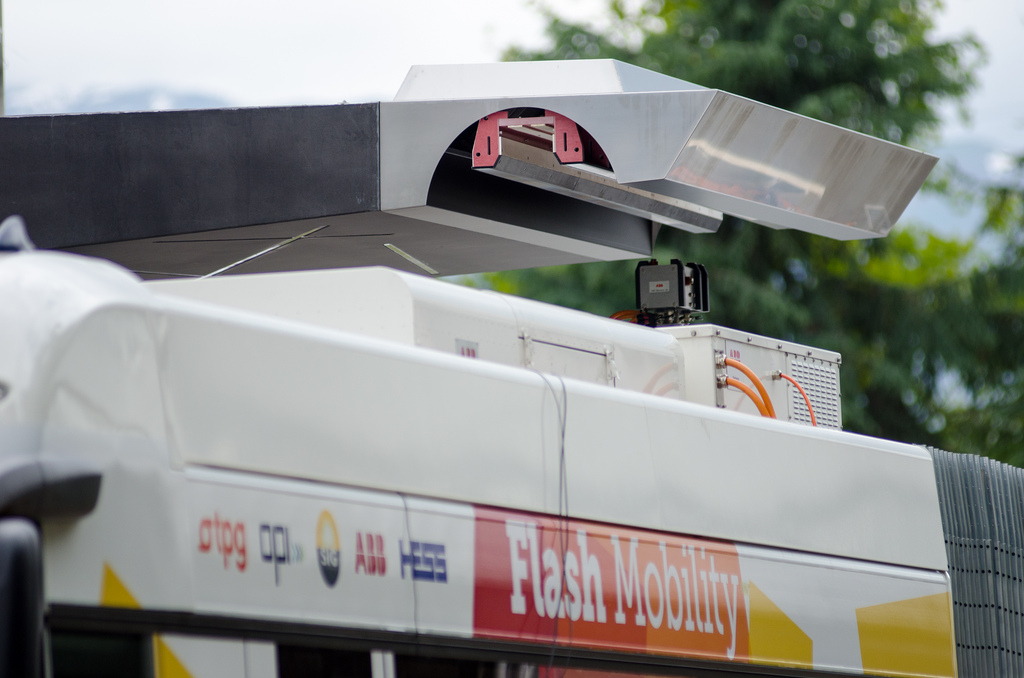
ABB TOSA Energy Transfer System

- transport public genève (tpg) introduce TOSA Flash Mobility, Clean City, Smart Bus a new system of mass transport with electric "flash" recharging of the buses at selected bus stops.
- Schaffhausen: Verkehrsbetriebe Schaffhausen, new electric bus replacement of trolleybus systems

==== United Kingdom ====
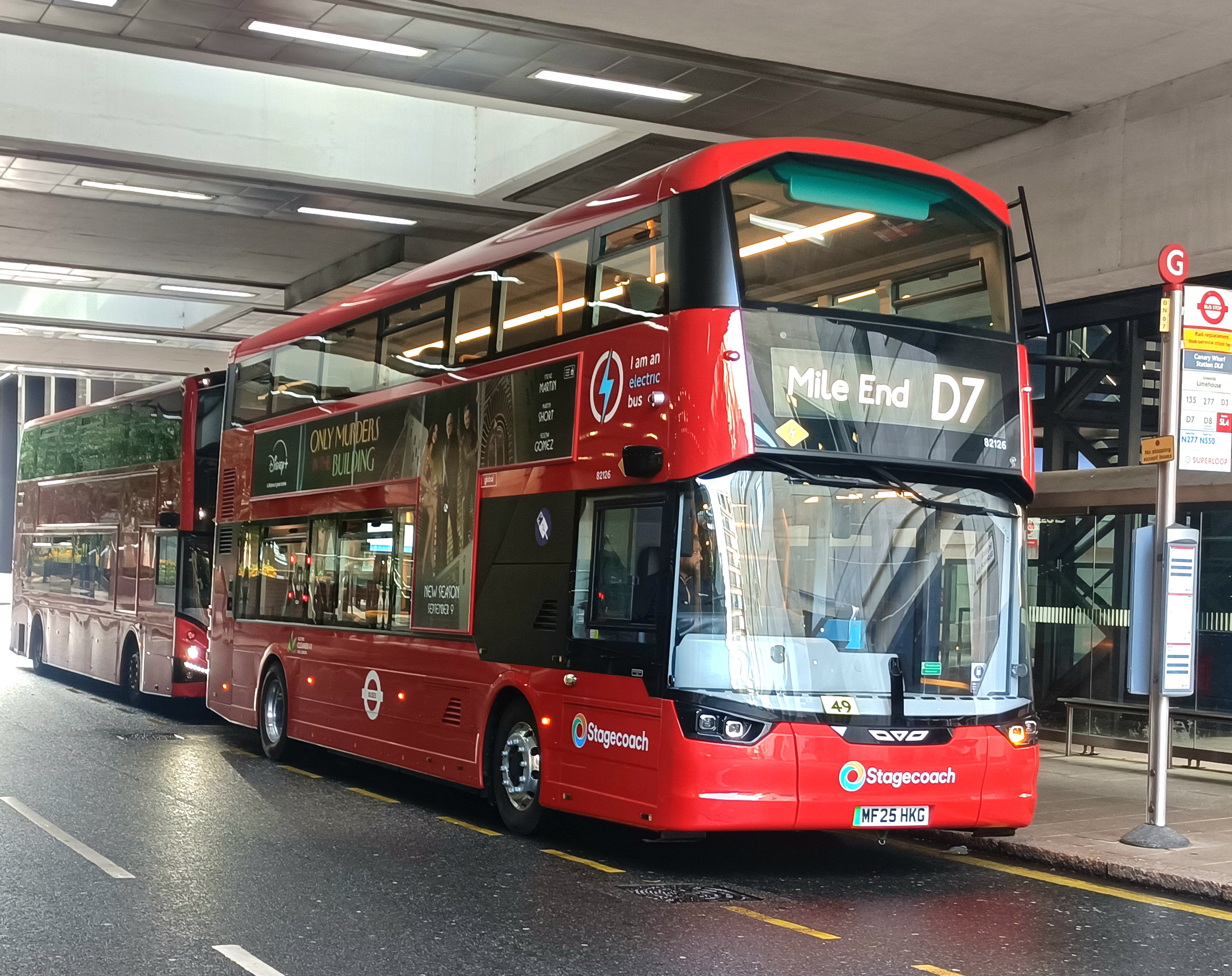
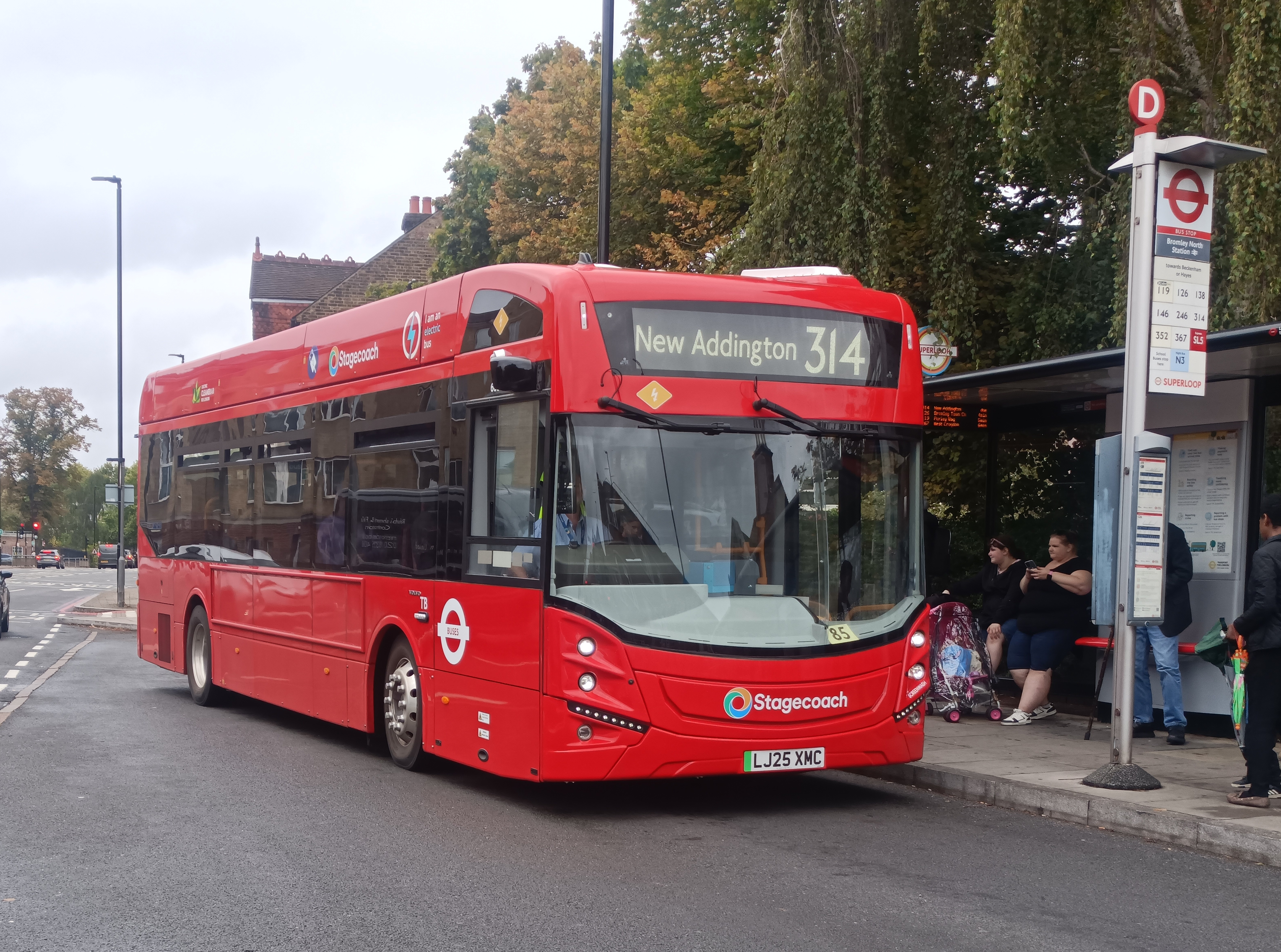
London has the 2nd largest electric fleet in Europe
- Birmingham: Since July 2020, National Express West Midlands has been operating 19 fully electric ADL/BYD double deckers on the 6 route from Birmingham to Solihull, via Hall Green and Shirley
- Bristol: Route 72 from City Centre to Frenchay UWE campus
- Coventry: Since September 2023, National Express Coventry has been operating 140 fully electric ADL/BYD double deckers on various routes, which occupied 80% of their fleet.
- Durham: Cathedral and City Centre loop
- Glasgow: Strathclyde Partnership for Transport runs battery-powered electric buses on one route in Glasgow, between George Square and the Transport Museum.
- Greater Manchester: Stagecoach plans to buy 105 electric buses for use in the Greater Manchester area by 2020.
- Guildford: Introduced a fleet of electric buses on its Park and Ride services on 7 January 2019.
- Inverness: Stagecoach North Scotland operates 5 Optare solo EVs.
- Leicester: First Leicester and Leicester Arriva Midlands operate Wright StreetDeck Electroliner BEVs and Wright GB Kite Electroliner BEVs and Yutong E12 and Yutong E15 BEVs.
- London: As of August 2023, 1000 zero-emission buses operate in London, the 2nd largest fleet in Europe.
- Milton Keynes: Route 7
- Newcastle upon Tyne: Go North East started operation of Yutong E10s under the Voltra brand name on routes 53 and 54 in June 2021.
- Norwich: Since November 2023, First Eastern Counties operates 60 Wright StreetDeck Electroliner BEVs and 15 Wright GB Kite Electroliner BEVs
- Nottingham: CT4N operate a fleet of electric Optare Solos, Versas and BYD K9UR buses on contract services for Nottingham City Council

=== North America ===
==== Aruba ====
- Oranjestad: (BYD)

==== Canada ====
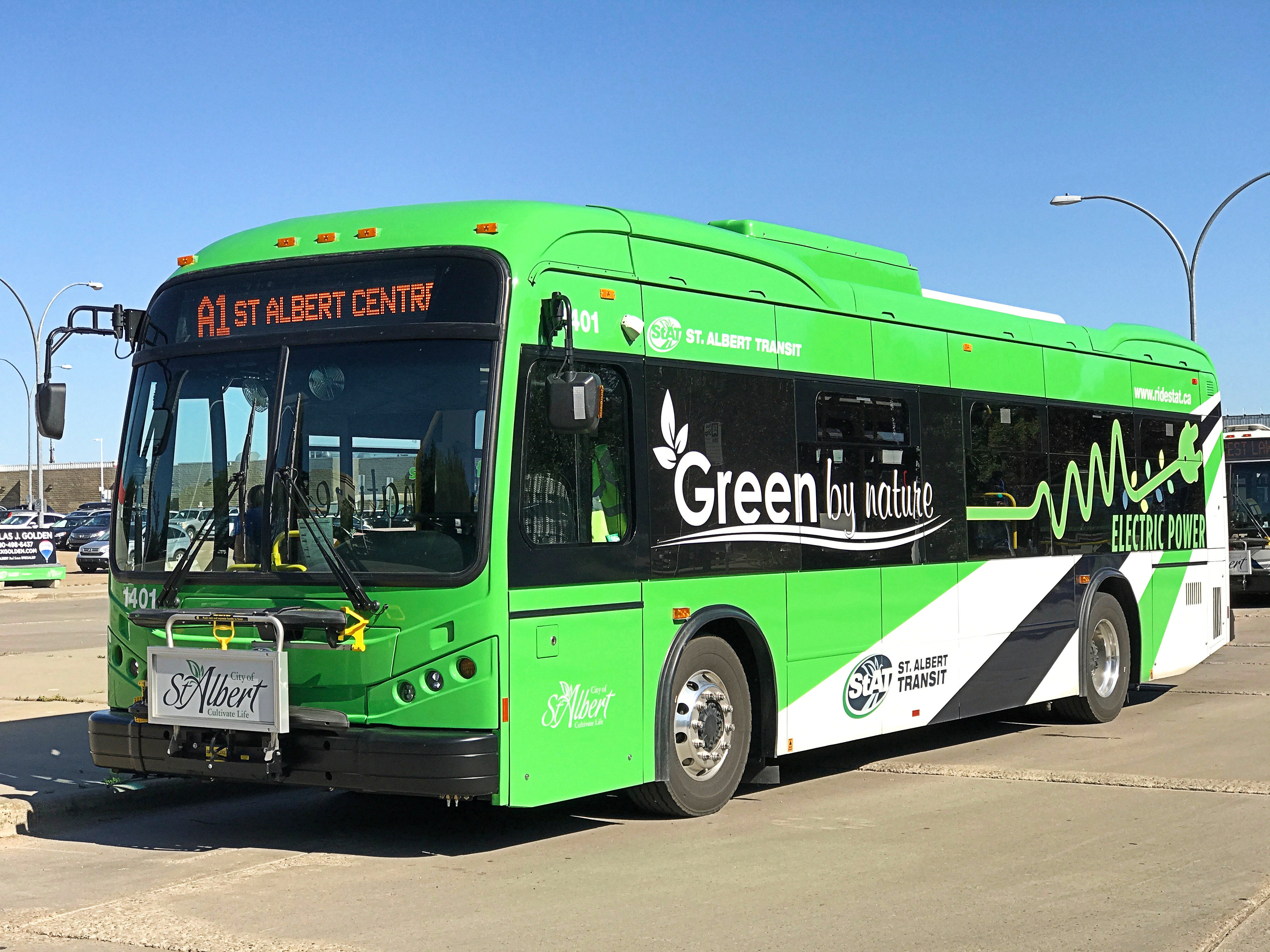
St. Albert in Canada's oil producing province of Alberta.

===== British Columbia =====
- Vancouver electric buses have been in operation since 1948; TransLink operates 260 of them.
- Victoria – CVS Tours currently deploys North America's first all-electric double decker bus made by GreenPower Motor Company.

===== Ontario =====
- Toronto (Proterra, New Flyer, BYD)
- Windsor (BYD)

===== Québec =====
- Réseau de transport de la Capitale, Quebec City's public transit authority, has integrated 8 electric buses to its fleet in 2008 to serve the Old City. The Tecnobus Gulliver buses can carry up to 20 passengers and run on $3.25 worth of electricity per day.
- Société de transport de Montréal, Montreal, bus fleet going all-electric or hybrid by 2029. 2017 – Cité-Mobilité project : 7 electric buses on line 36 with high-speed charging.

==== United States ====
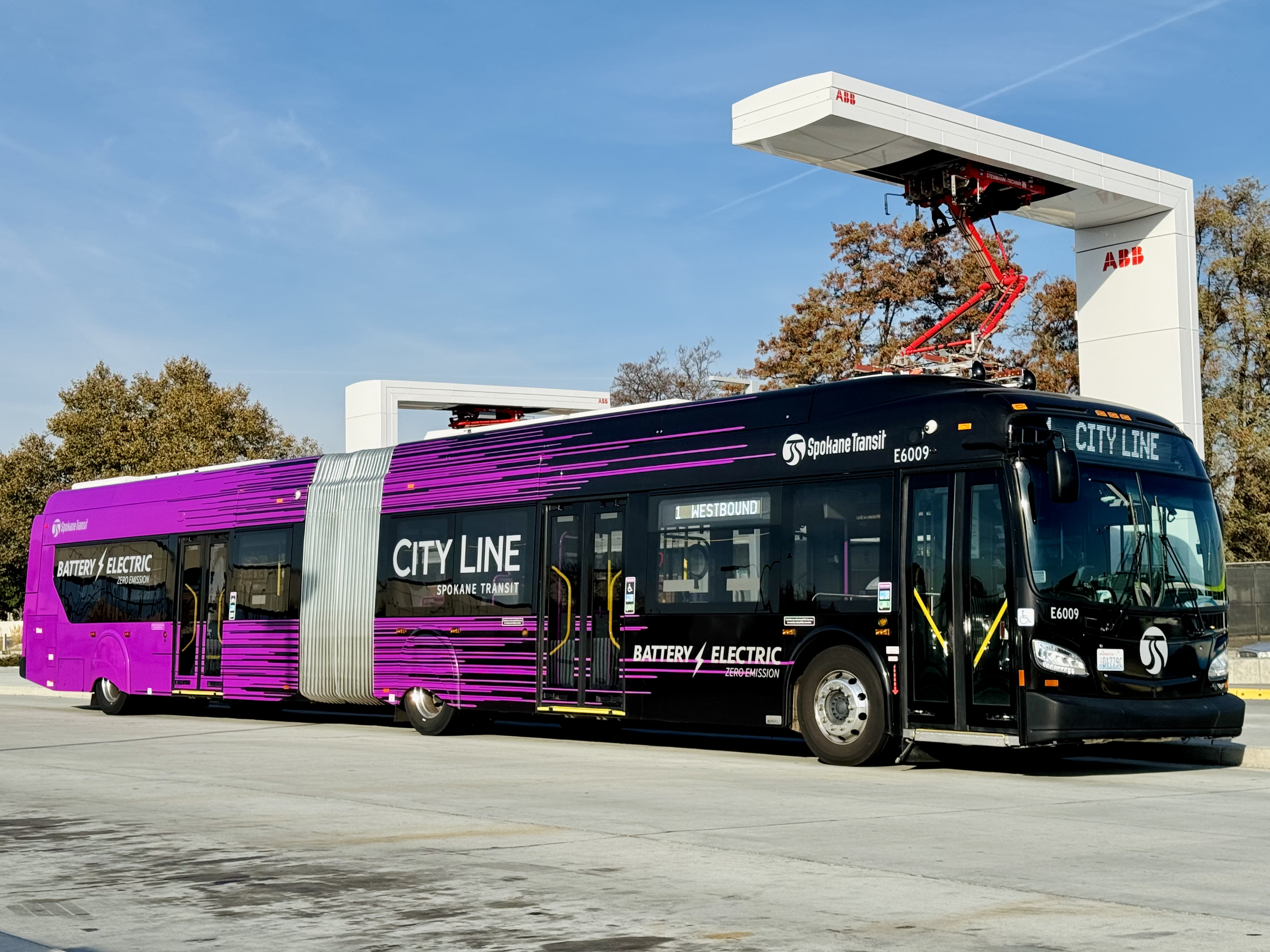
Spokane Transit City Line at charging station

In November 2019, orders for new electric buses had outpaced manufacturing capacity.

The 2021 Infrastructure Investment and Jobs Act included $2.5 billion in funding for electric school buses, to be distributed over five years. By June 2022, there were commitments to 12,275 electric school buses in 38 states.

A 2022 study by National Grid and Hitachi Energy indicates that installing charging infrastructure for fleet electrification will require location-specific upgrades to the US electrical grid.

In 2022, there were 5,269 battery electric buses.

Cities using electric buses include:

- Anaheim, California
- Atlanta, Georgia (at Emory University)
- Cambridge, Massachusetts
- Chattanooga, Tennessee – CARTA
- Chicago, Illinois
- Colorado Springs, Colorado
- Dallas, Texas
- Dayton, Ohio
- Denver, Colorado – RDT Free MallRide
- Frederick, Maryland
- Greenville, South Carolina
- Gulfport, Mississippi
- Hampton, Virginia
- Indianapolis, Indiana
- Ithaca, New York
- Lexington, Kentucky
- Los Angeles, California
- Louisville, Kentucky
- Miami Beach, Florida
- Mobile, Alabama
- Nashville, Tennessee
- New Haven, Connecticut
- New York City
- Pomona, California
- Portland, Maine
- Portland, Oregon
- Philadelphia, Pennsylvania
- Providence, Rhode Island
- Reno, Nevada
- Santa Barbara, California
- San Antonio, Texas
- San Diego, California
- San Francisco, California
- Seattle, Washington
- Seneca, South Carolina
- Spokane, Washington
- Stockton, California
- Tallahassee, Florida
- Worcester, Massachusetts
- Wichita, Kansas

===== California =====
Since 2000, the California Air Resources Board has had a Fleet Rule for Transit Agencies, which requires transit agencies to reduce emissions. In 2018 it issued the Innovative Clean Transit rule, which requires all new transit buses purchased after 2029 to be zero-emissions buses.

Long Beach, California and the Antelope Valley Transit Authority charge some of their buses on special wireless charging pads located along bus routes.

By 2019, more than 200 e-buses were in service in California. Several hundred more e-buses for California were in backlogged orders.

In 2023, Oakland, California introduced the first major fleet of electric school buses in a U.S. school district. These buses not only serve as a mode of transportation for students but also contribute 2.1 gigawatt-hours of electricity annually to the power grid, which is sufficient to power between 300 and 400 homes. This initiative holds particular importance in Oakland, a community where many students come from low-income families that are disproportionately affected by industrial pollution. The electric buses are projected to reduce carbon dioxide emissions by about 25,000 tons each year, thereby improving both the environment and health conditions within the community.

=== Total operating cost per mile ===
NREL publishes zero-emission bus evaluation results from various commercial operators. NREL published following total operating cost per mile: with County Connection, for June 2017 through May 2018, for an 8-vehicle diesel bus fleet, the total operating cost per mile was $0.84; for a 4-vehicle electric bus fleet, $1.11; with Long Beach Transit, for 2018, for a 10-vehicle electric bus fleet, $0.85; and with Foothill Transit, for 2018, for a 12-vehicle electric bus fleet, $0.84.

=== States without plans for e-buses ===
In 2019, "only five states, Arkansas, New Hampshire, North Dakota, South Dakota and West Virginia, ... [had] no transit agencies planning to operate electric buses or hydrogen fuel cell buses."

=== Oceania ===
==== Australia ====
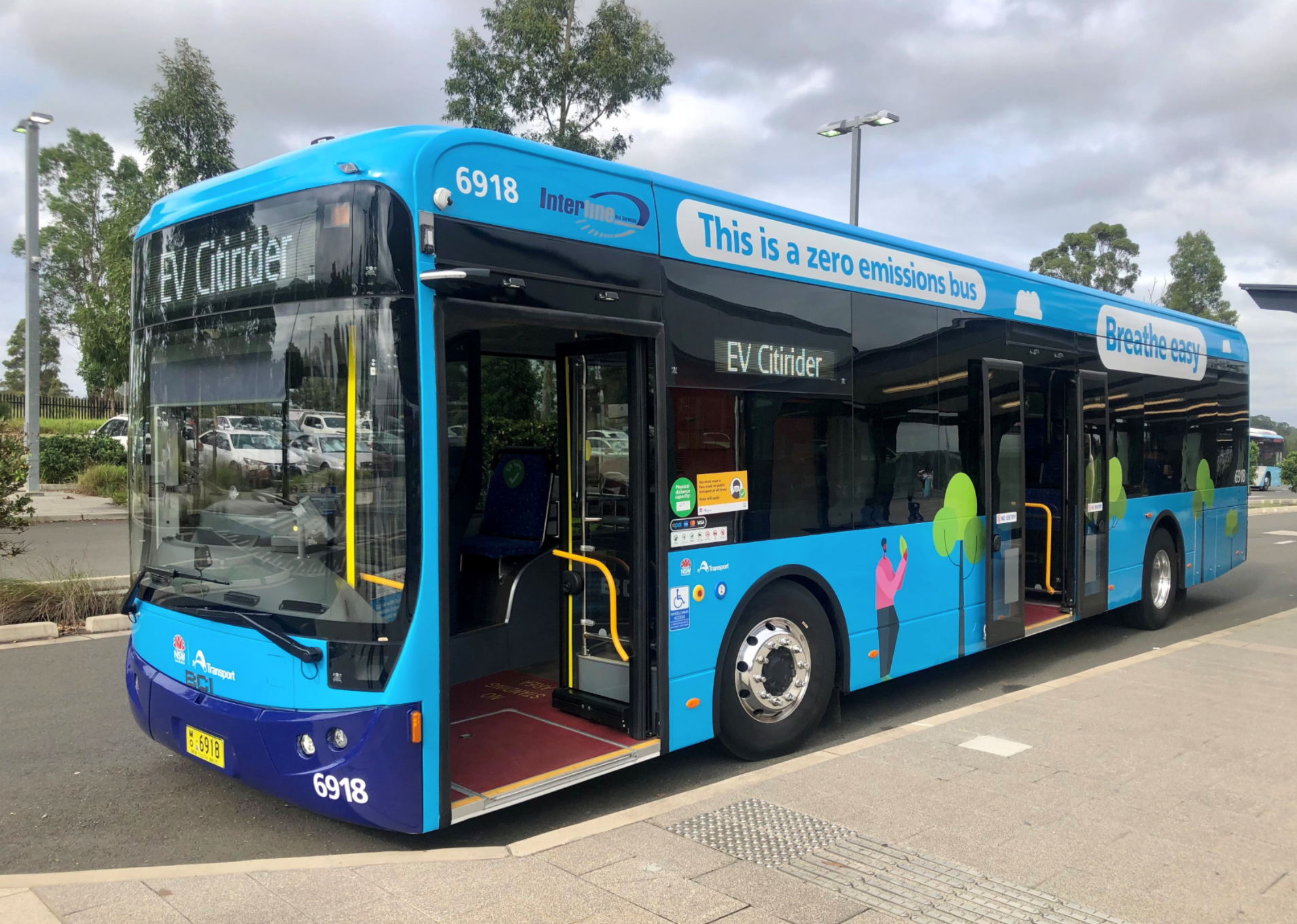
Interline Bus Services electric bus in Sydney, Australia

===== Australian Capital Territory =====
- In September 2017, Transport Canberra began operating two electric buses based at its Tuggeranong depot.
- In December 2020, the reelected ALP government announced that it would purchase 90 new electric buses for in 2021 with the aim to have Canberra's entire bus fleet converted to electric by 2024. Upgrades to bus depots would be completed during this time with Woden bus depot being the first to be upgraded.

===== New South Wales =====
- In 2016 Carbridge procured a fleet of six BYD electric buses to replace its diesel car park shuttles at Sydney Airport.
- Transport for NSW began a trial of electric buses on the South Coast before conducting a more expansive trial in region 6 in Sydney in 2019.
- In December 2020, the NSW government announced that it would roll out 120 electric buses across Sydney in 2021. Transport minister Andrew Constance also announced a goal to transition the entire state's 8,000 strong bus fleet to battery electric by 2030.
- Sydney, November, 2021: A new rollout of zero emissions buses has begun as part of an ARENA-supported project. The buses will be charged from a solar array installed on the roof of the Leichhardt depot, storing energy in onboard batteries capable of holding up to ten times as much energy as an electric car.

===== Queensland =====
- Brisbane's new Brisbane Metro rapid bus system uses a fleet of 60 bi-articulated electric buses that visually resemble light rail vehicles. These were supplied by Swiss-based manufacturer Carrosserie Hess.
- Kinetic Sunshine Coast has 11 electric buses on the Sunshine Coast, and Kinetic Cairns and Kinetic Sunshine Coast 26 total in Cairns and on Gold Coast operating contracts for Translink.

===== Western Australia =====
- In July 2020, the Public Transport Authority announced that it would trial four Volvo electric buses on Perth's Joondalup CAT bus route.

===== Victoria =====
- Melbourne's first fully electric bus began carrying passengers on Transdev Melbourne route 246 in October 2019. The body construction and fit out for the new bus was carried out in Dandenong by Volgren.
- In February 2024, Ventura became the first operator in Melbourne to operate an entirely electric fleet from one of its depots. The depot in Ivanhoe was converted to operate 27 electric buses built by Volgren.

==== New Zealand ====
- In April 2018, Auckland Transport began a trial with two electric Alexander Dennis Enviro200 buses. These buses run on the City Link service around Auckland's central business district. The trial continues as of February 2019.
- In July 2018, Tranzurban introduced 10 electric double Decker buses in Wellington. 22 more buses are expected to be in service by 2021. NZ Bus have ordered 67 single Decker buses which will enter service between 2021 and 2023.
- In June 2019, Red Bus introduced three Alexander Dennis Enviro200 bodied BYD K9 electric buses for use on the 29 Airport route.

=== South America ===
==== Argentina ====
- Buenos Aires: Starting May 2025, 12 units made by Asiastar and imported by Agrale began covering a 7 kilometer journey between Lezama Park and the Retiro railway station, operated by the local government.

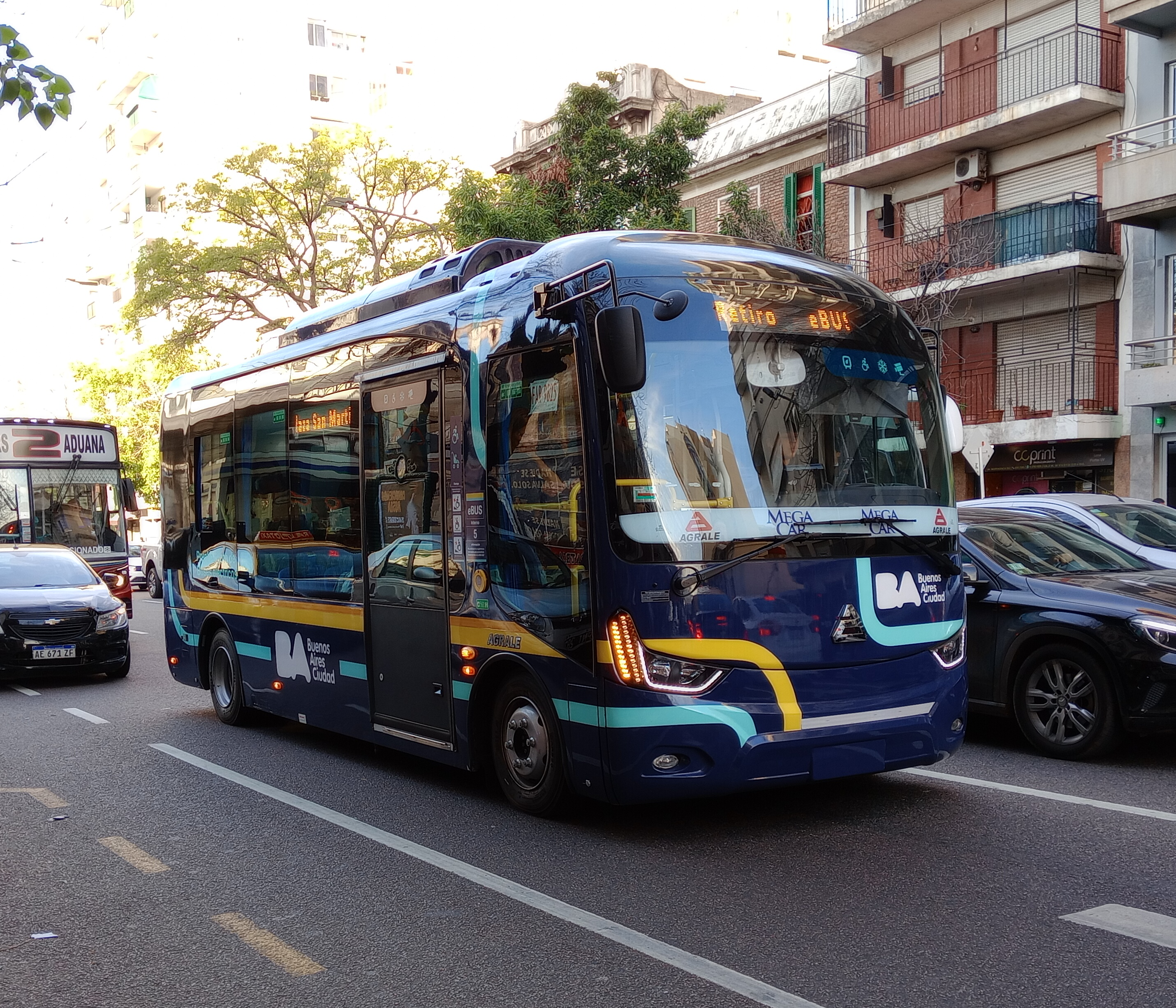
Electric minibus in Buenos Aires

==== Brazil ====
- São Paulo: (BYD, Higer, Eletra, MBB)
- Campinas: (BYD)
- São José dos Campos: (BYD)

==== Chile ====
- Santiago: According to official stats, Santiago has 1580 electric buses, being the city with the biggest electric bus fleet outside of China. (BYD, Yutong, Foton, King Long, Zhongtong)
- Valparaíso: (BYD)

==== Colombia ====
- Bogotá: The Transmilenio and the Sistema Integrado de Transporte de Bogotá have 1485 electric buses, made by BYD and Yutong.

==== Uruguay ====
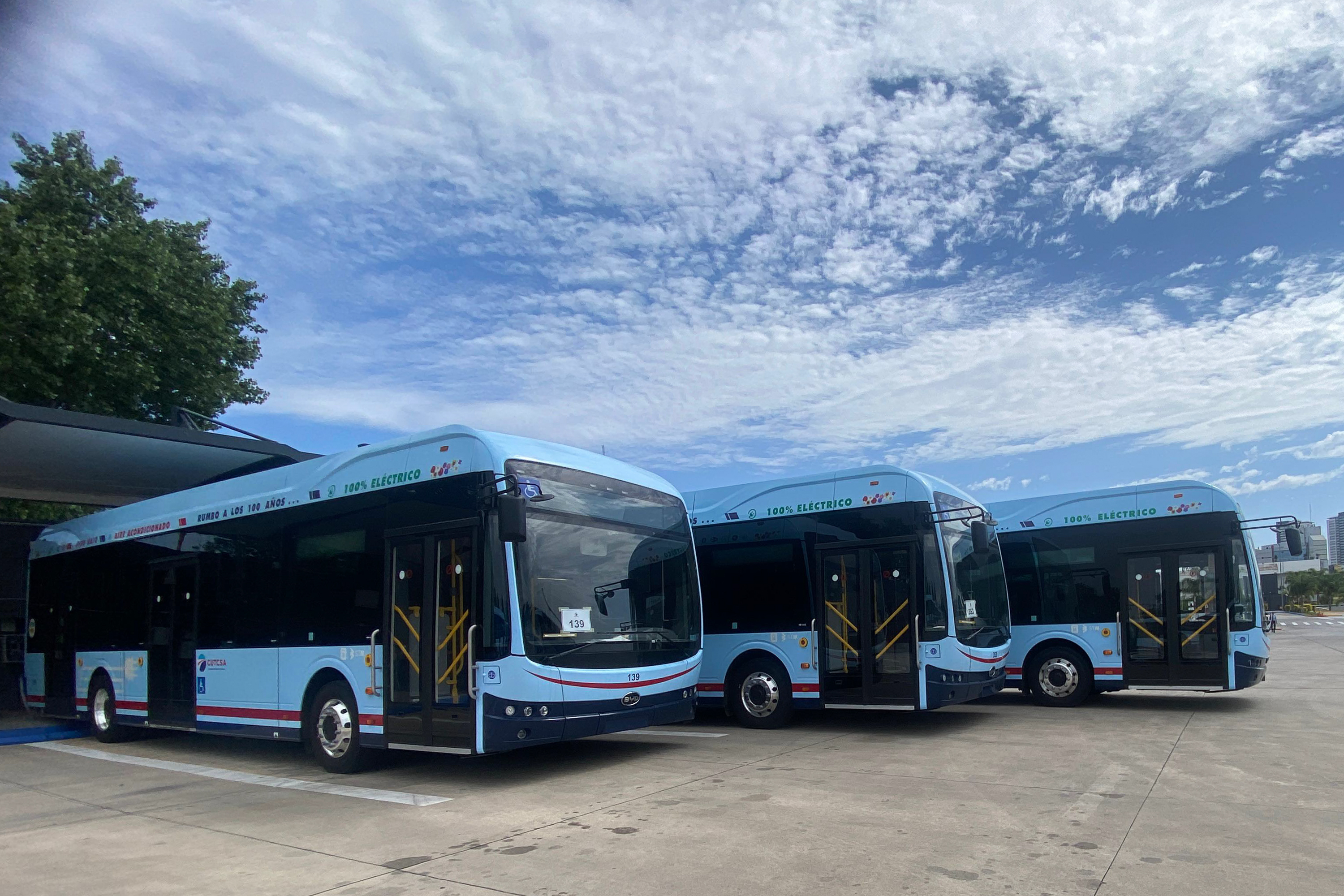
Montevideo has 177 electric buses, comprising 11.4% of the total fleet of the city

- Montevideo: as of October 2025 the city has 177 electric buses, which makes 11.4% of the total fleet of buses. 60 more are expected to arrive in the following months.

Montevideo's largest urban and sub-urban transit bus operator CUTCSA announced in 2024 their plans to electrify 50% of their fleet by 2030, 70% by 2035 and 100% by 2040.

- Canelones-Las Piedras: (Ankai × 6). Since 2019 the bus operator Compañia del Este o Codeleste has been buying Ankai electric low-floor buses for use in general lines of different models.
- Durazno: (Ankai × 2). The bus operator Nossar (which has operated urban and suburban bus services in the department since 1925, and interdepartmental services since 1987) bought 2 Ankai units for urban services, these units arrived at the Montevideo port and were driven about 200 km to Durazno by members of the Nossar family (owners of Nossar since its foundation).

== See also ==
- Battery electric bus
- Battery electric vehicle
- Capacitor electric vehicle
- Conductive charging
- Electric road
- Electric truck
- Electric vehicle
- Electromote
- Gyrobus
- List of buses
- List of electric bus makers
- In-motion charging electric bus
- List of bus operating companies
- Online electric vehicle
- Public transport
- Plug-in hybrid
- Revo Powertrains
- Solar bus
- Trolleybus
- Vehicle Automation:Passenger Shuttles
- Wrightspeed X1
