= List of electric bus makers =

List of electric bus makers lists makers of battery-powered all-electric buses. Makers of trolleybuses are listed separately at List of trolleybus manufacturers.

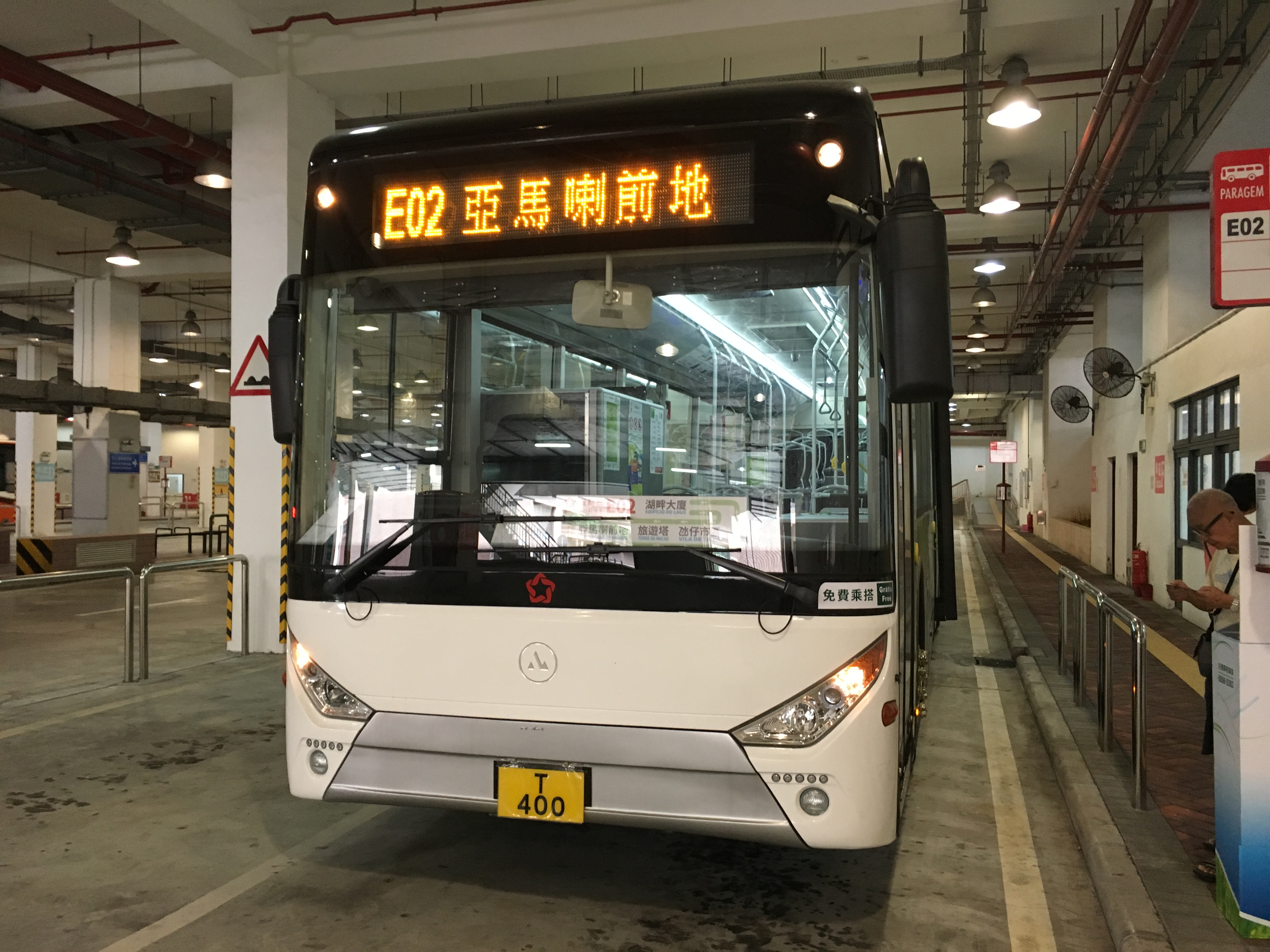
AVASS Matilda full electric city bus with a range of up to 600 km on a single charge

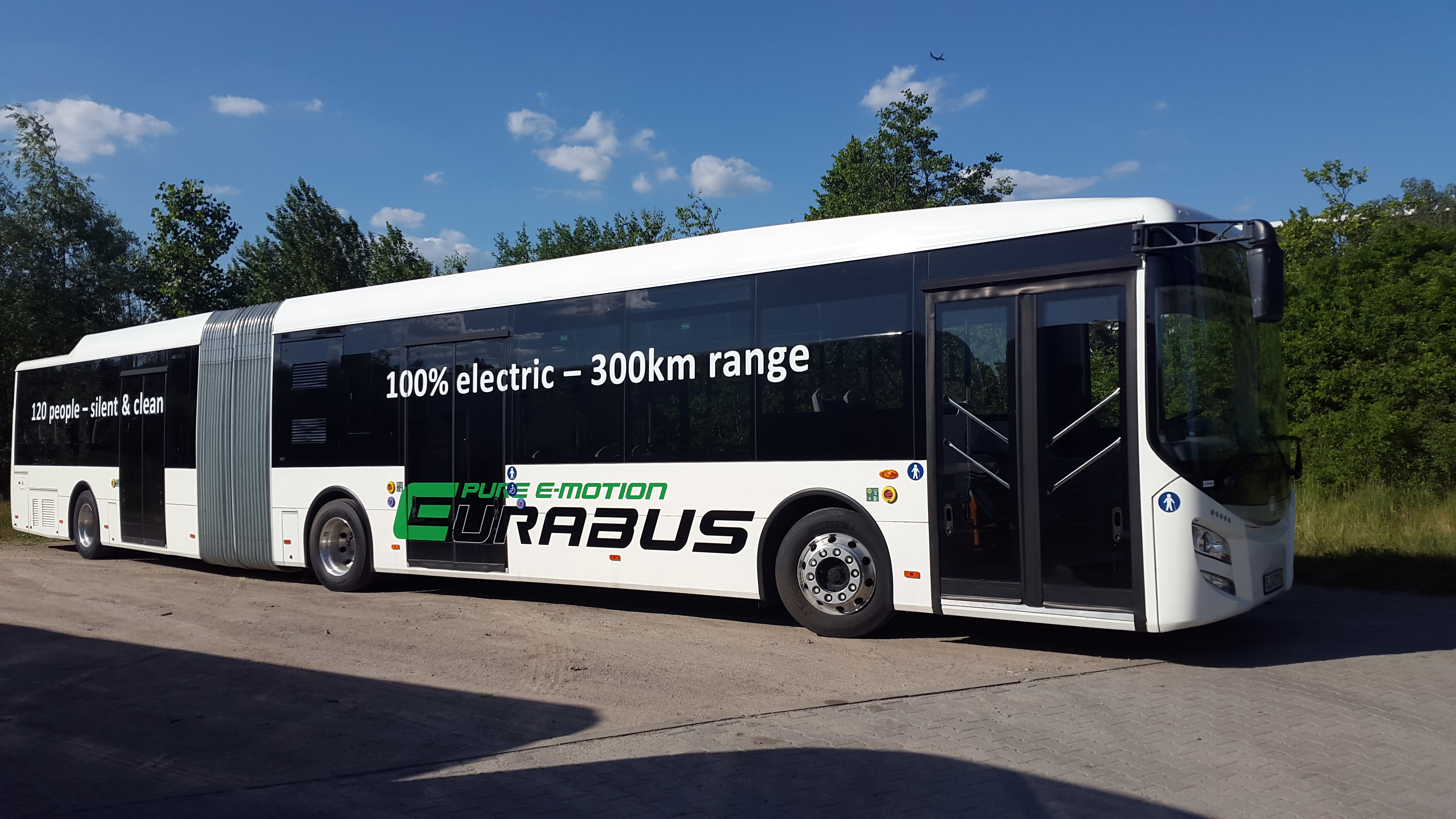
Eurabus 2.0 – 18-meter articulated bus

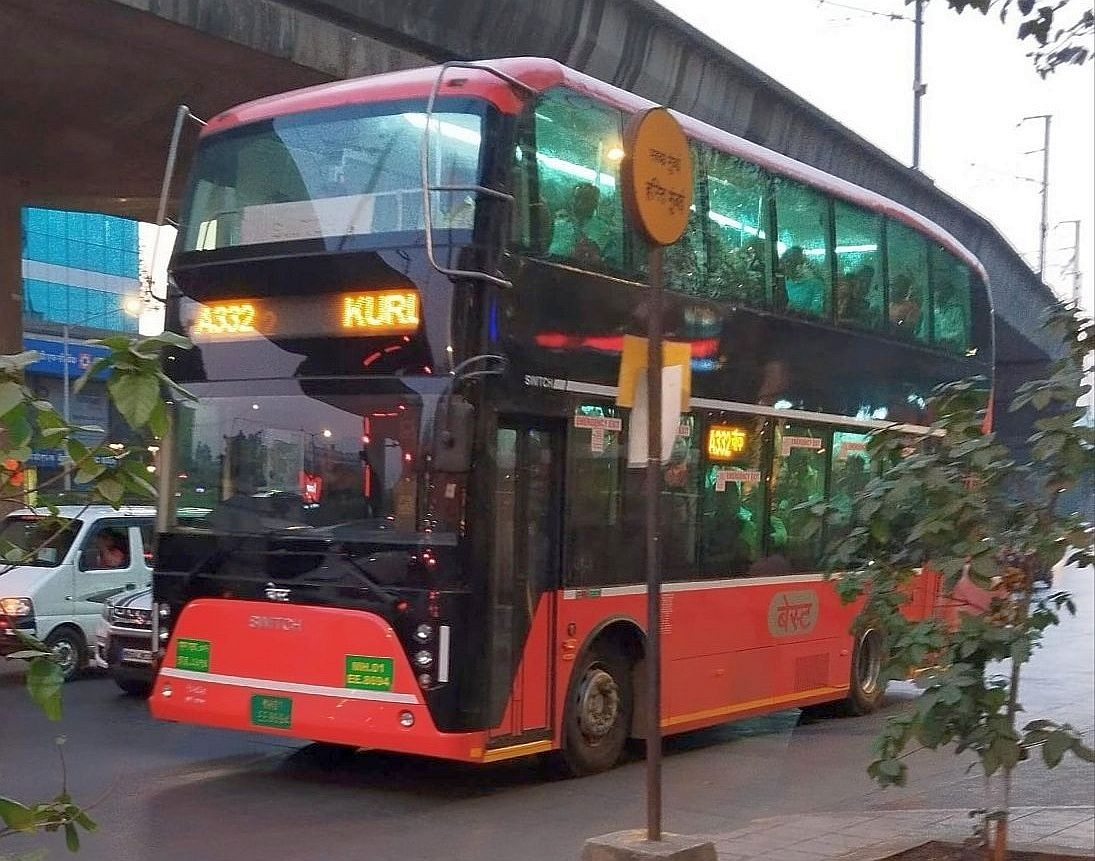
BEST Switch EiV 22 in January 2024 in Mumbai

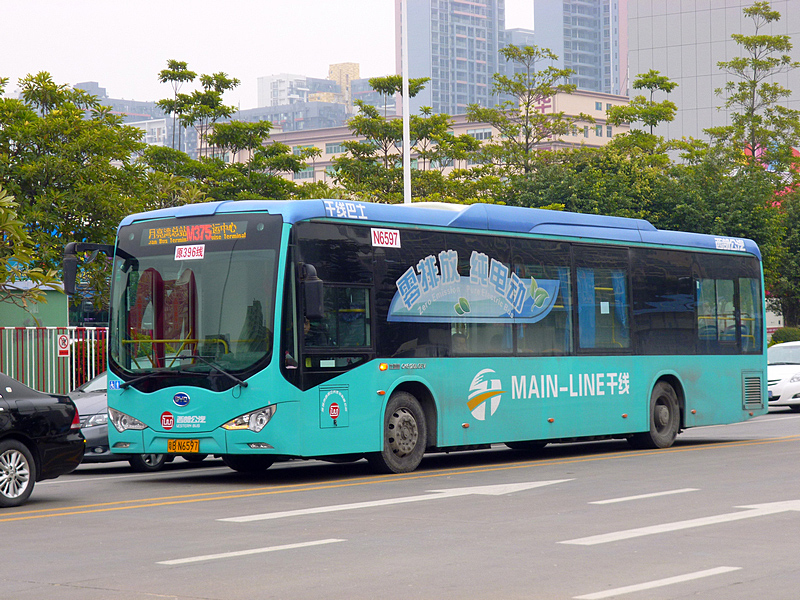
The BYD K9 all-electric bus allegedly has the longest drive range of 250 km (155 miles) on one single charge under urban road conditions.

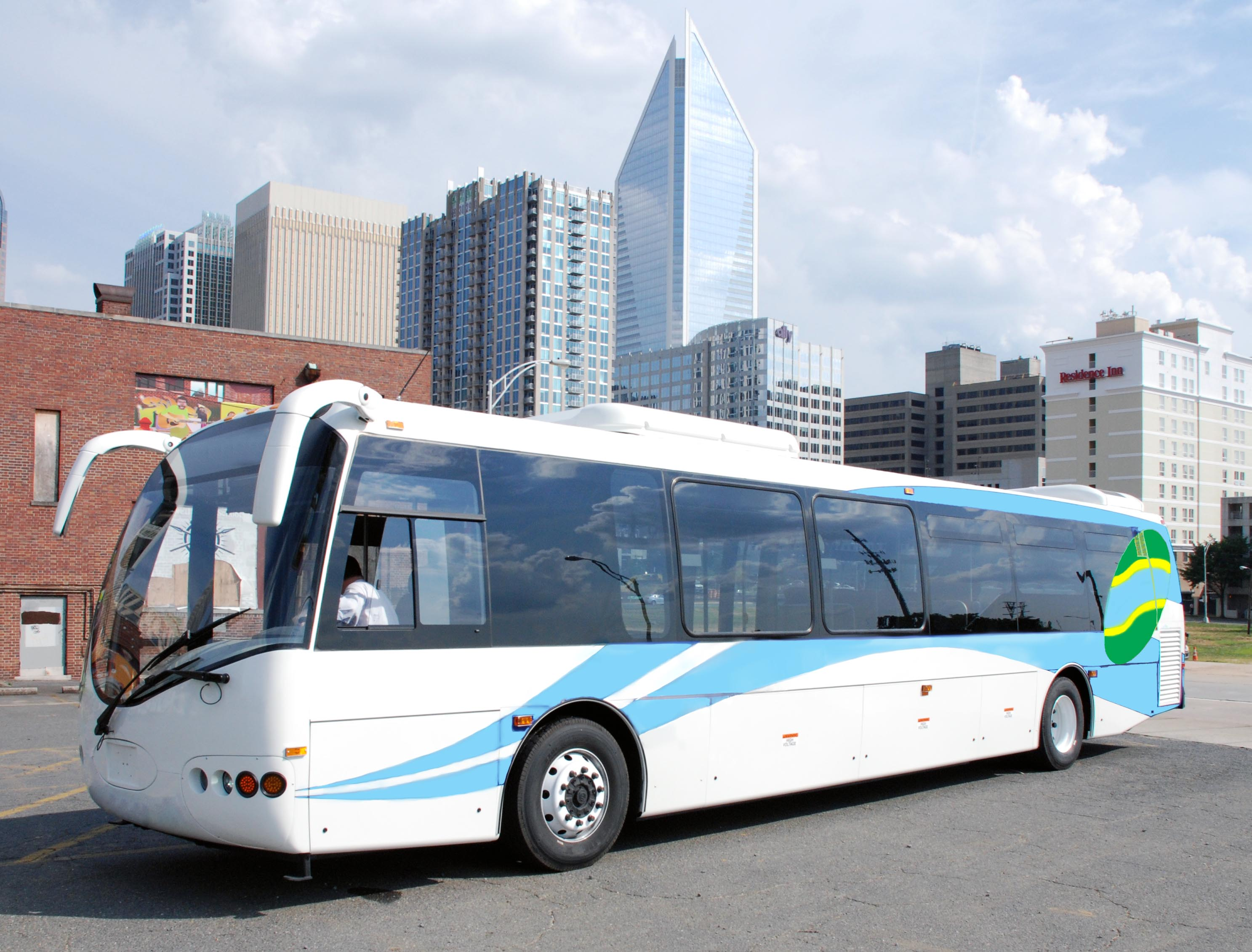
EPV EcoSmart

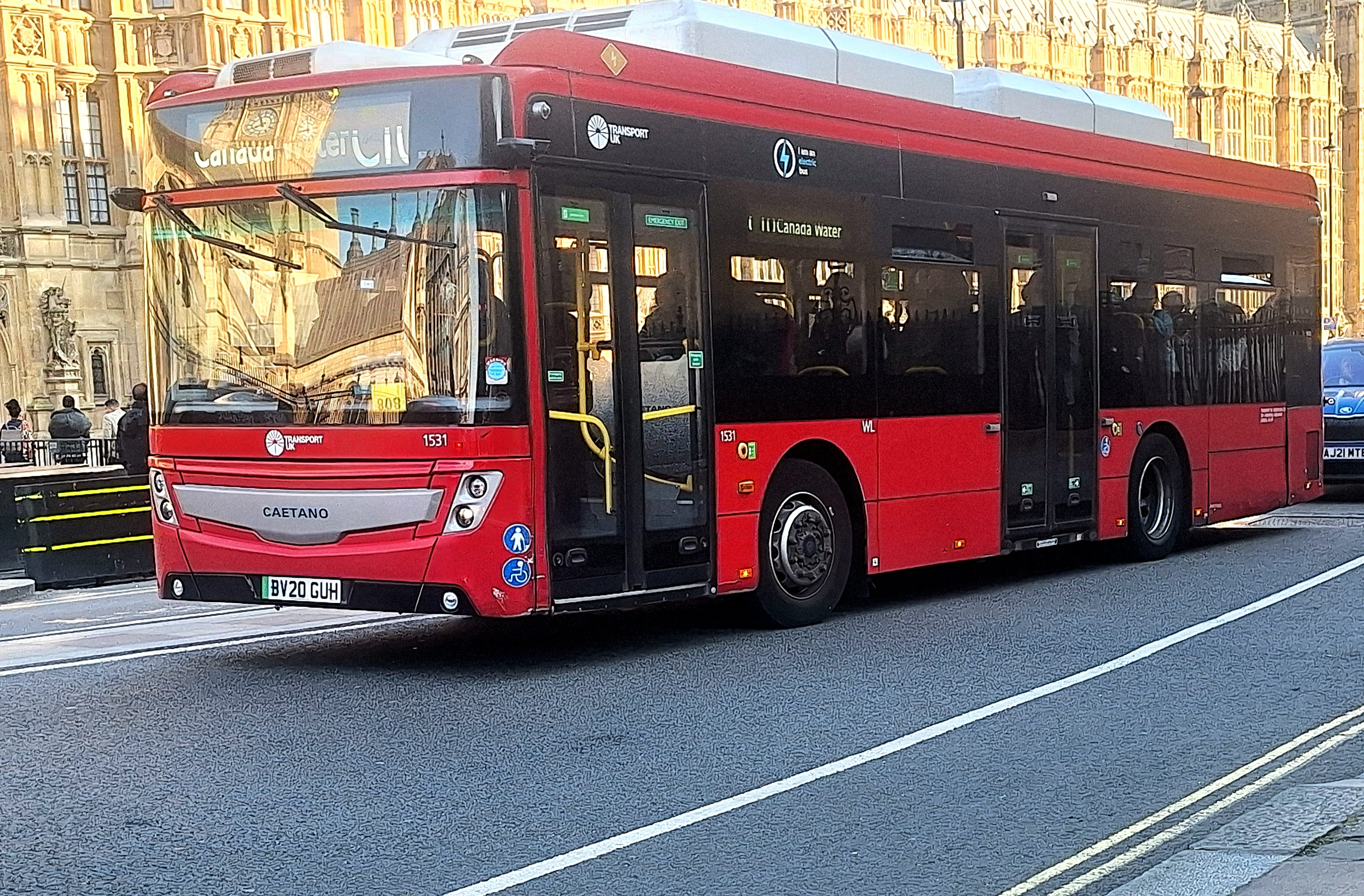
A Salvador Caetano e.City Gold battery electric bus in Westminster, London

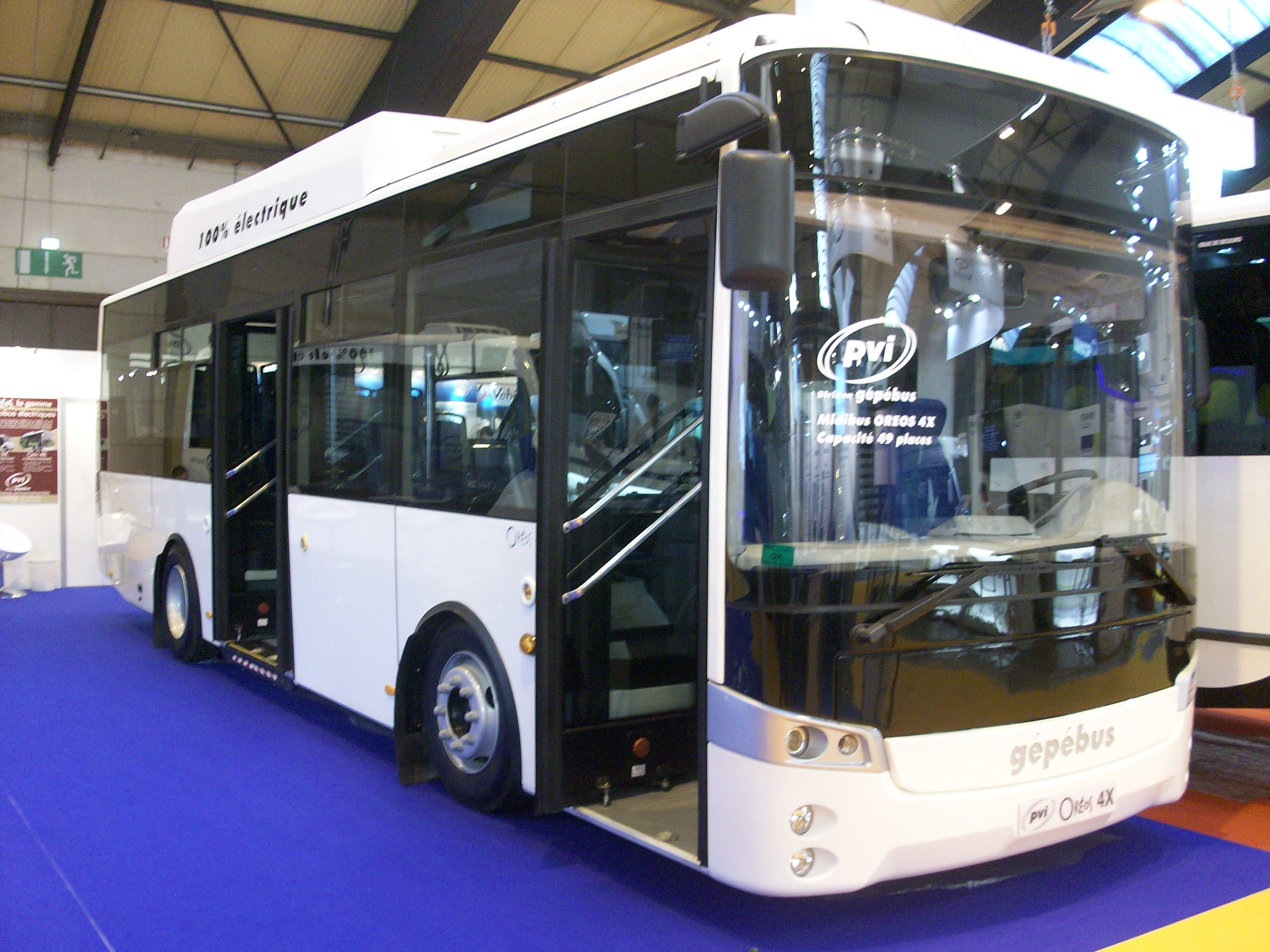
Gépébus Oreos 4X

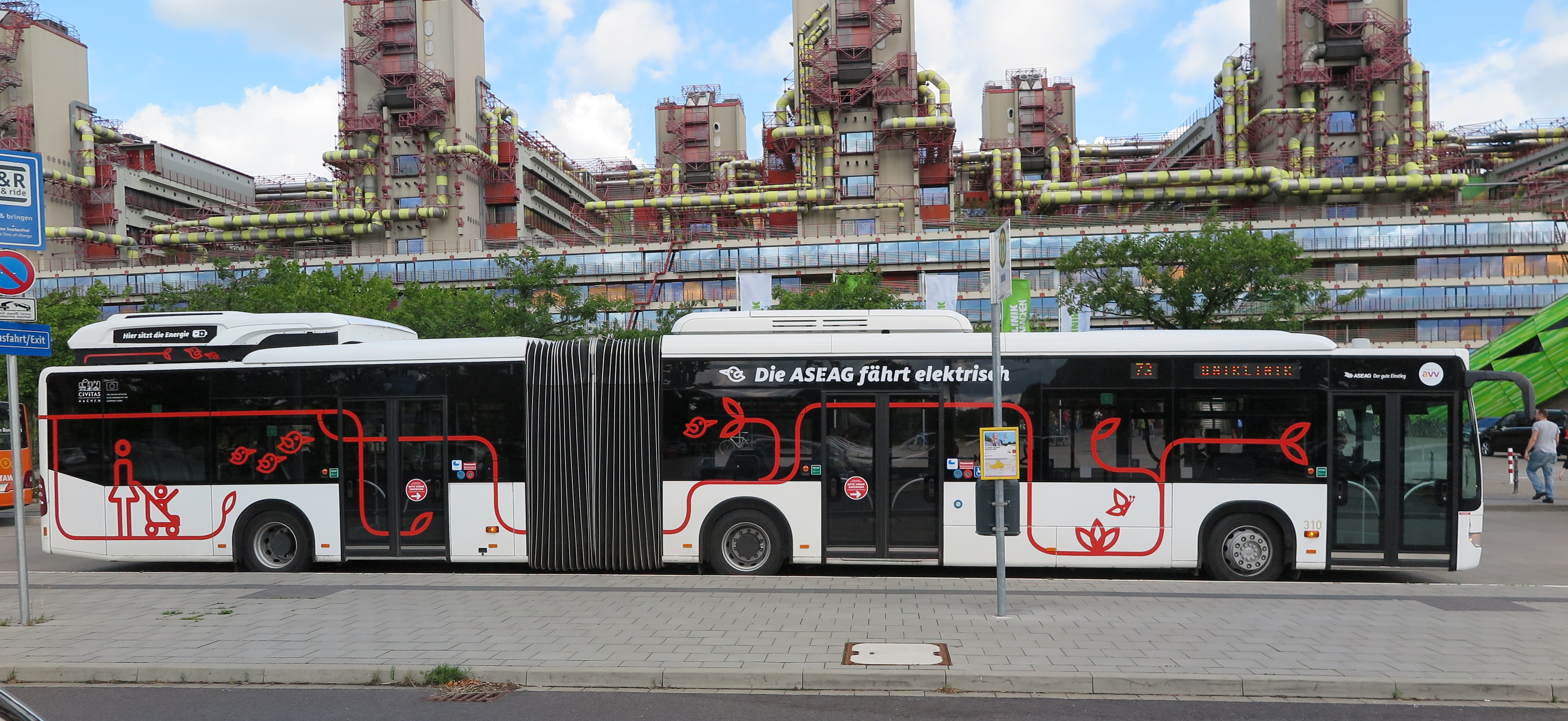
Battery-powered Mercedes-Benz Citaro in Aachen, Germany

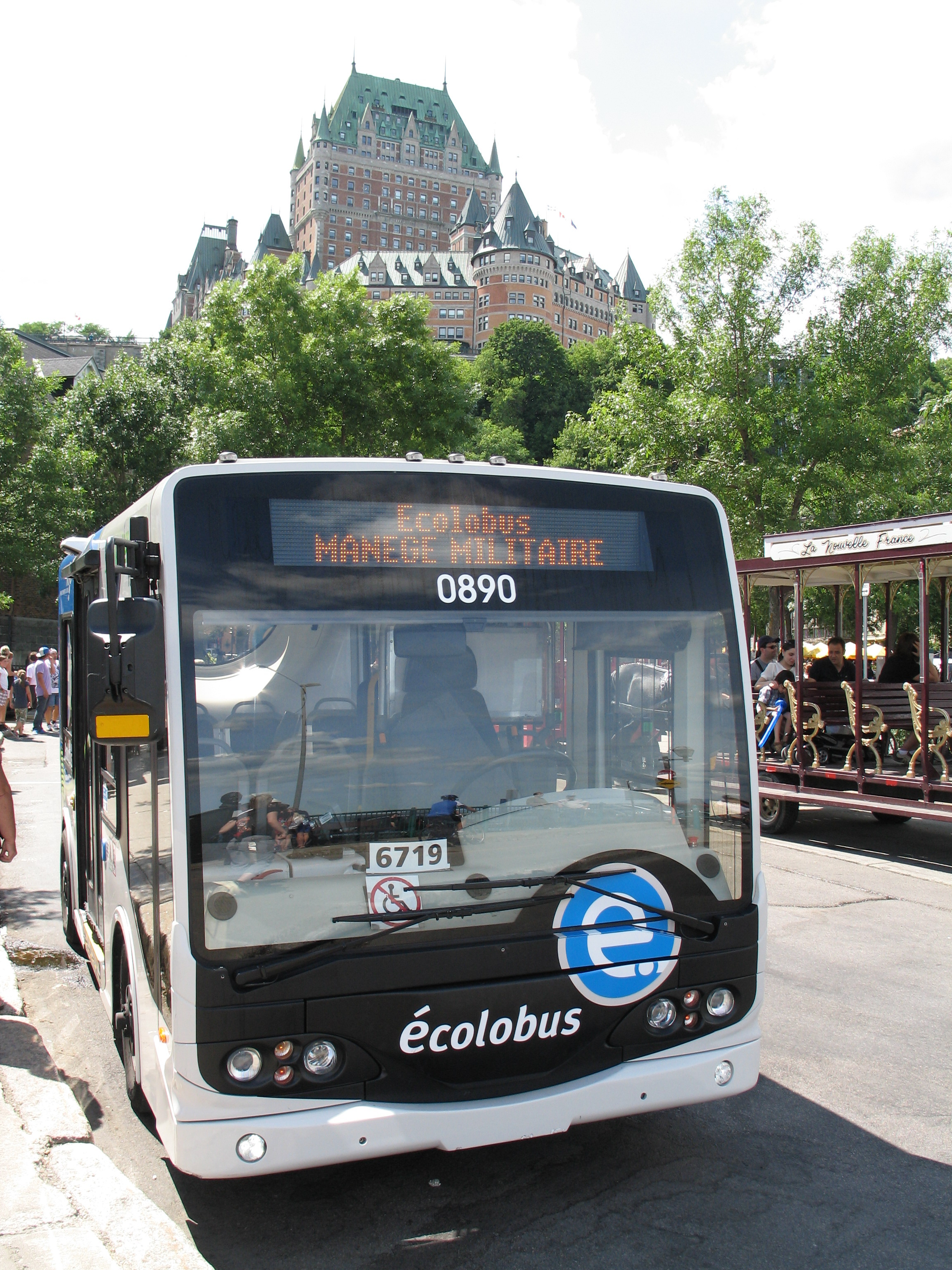
A fleet of eight Tecnobus Gulliver has been operated from 2008 to 2015 by the Réseau de transport de la Capitale, in Québec City.

== Americas ==
=== Brazil ===
- Marcopolo Attivi, low-floor electric battery-powered bus, Rio Grande do Sul, Brazil.

=== Canada ===
- GreenPower Motor Company manufactures several high-floor and low-floor battery-powered bus models.
- New Flyer currently offers battery-electric buses in 35, 40, and 60 foot configurations, and trolleybuses in 40 and 60 foot configurations.
- Nova Bus, in Québec, Canada, produces an electric version of its LF Series

=== United States ===
- APS Systems, Oxnard, CA, shuttle buses in partnership with Enova Systems and Saft
- Astonbus, Marina del Rey, CA: E-city midi and full-size models, with a range between 250 and 500 km. Astonbus is the Zonda Electric bus sole distributor in all EU states.
- Ebus, in Downey, California, minibuses: 22 feet (6.7 m) buses.
- Proterra in Greenville, SC: Proterra manufactures 35 and 40 foot (11 and 12 metre) versions of the ZX5. Previously, they manufactured the Catalyst model.
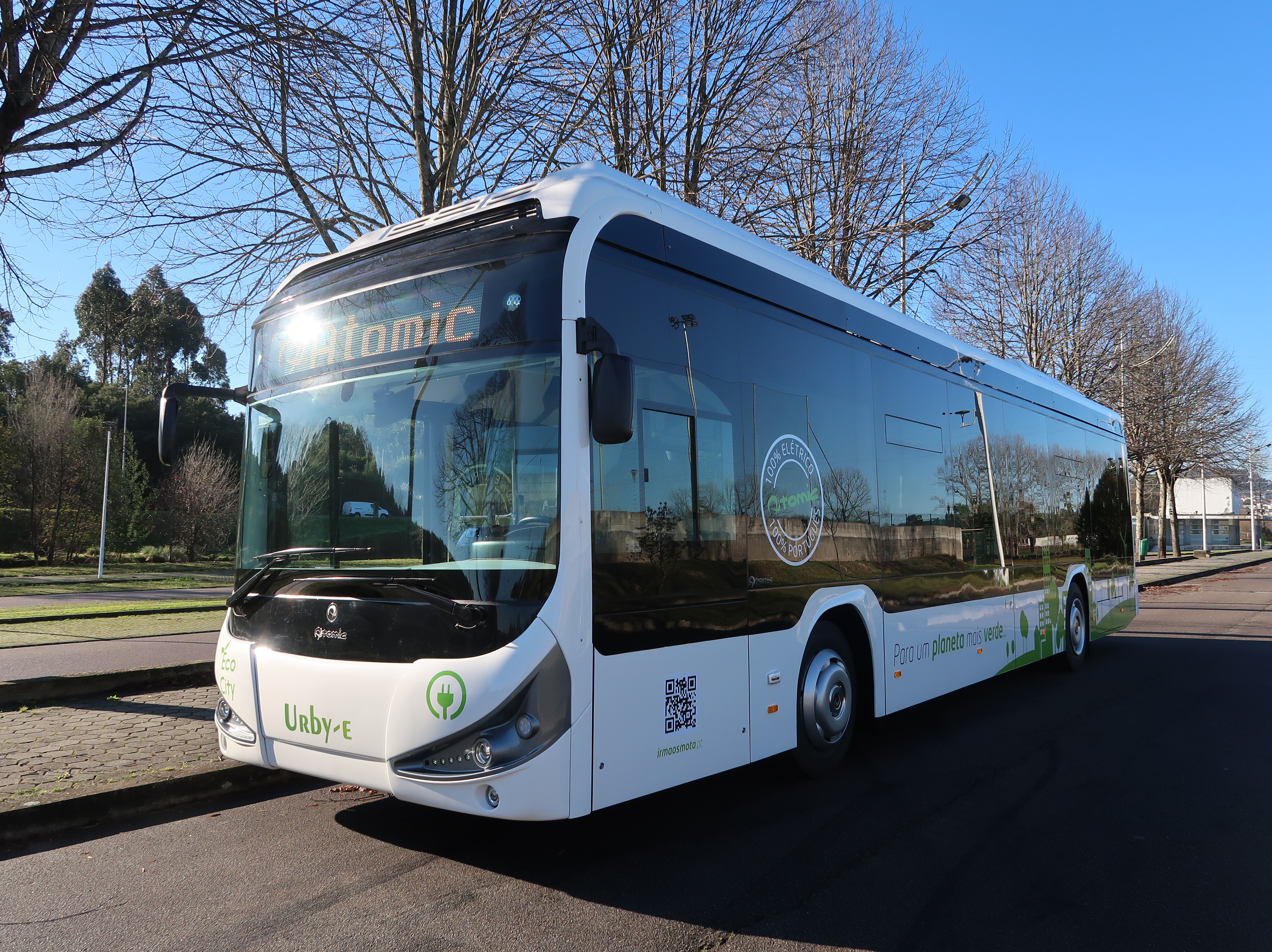
  Atomic Urby-e, electric bus developed and manufactured by Irmãos Mota, S.A.
- Smith Electric Vehicles, Kansas City, Missouri, Speedster and Edison electric minibuses.
- Specialty Vehicle Manufacturing Corp. (SVMC) in Downey, CA.
- Gillig manufactures a battery-electric version of their Low Floor Plus model, and a trolleybus version of their BRTPlus model.
- Complete Coach Works remanufactured electric bus in Riverside, CA.
- Thomas Built Buses Inc. in High Point, NC.

== Europe ==
=== Belarus ===
- Belkommunmash, in Minsk, Belarus. Models E420 "Vitovt Electro" and Е433 "Vitovt Max Electro".

=== Czech Republic ===
- Ekova, in Ostrava, Czech Republic. Design and production of electric low-floor buses, trams and trolleybuses.
- Škoda Electric, Czech Republic - electrical equipment only with Temsa and other bus builders as subcontractors for bodies and chassis

=== Finland ===
- Linkker, Finland. Design and production of battery-electric buses that use opportunity charging (3-5min fast charging). Highest energy efficiency in the market. Initial development together with VTT Technical Research Nrch Centre of Finland.

=== France ===
- Gépébus, France: Oréos 55E midibus in the 1990s and 2000s, Oréos 4X midibus launched in 2010.
- PVI, near Paris, France : Oreos 2X, Oreos 4X distributed under the brand Gepebus
- Heuliez, in France: 12-metre standard GX 337 Elec bus, 18-metre articulated GX 437 Elec bus
- Bolloré, in Brittany, France : Bluebus SE available as a standard 12-metre bus or an 18-metre articulated bus, and the 6-metre Bluebus 22.

=== Germany ===
- Eurabus, owned by Ram Tumuluri through Causis Group, who acquired the company in 2021 from Eurabus Group.
- Mercedes-Benz Citaro, battery-powered articulated bus in Aachen, Germany

=== Italy ===
- BredaMenarinibus in Bologna, Italy. Zeus M-200 E model, with Ansaldo Electric Drive motor and 288V – 200 Ah lithium-ion batteries.
- Iveco, in Turin, Italy: EuroPolis model.
- Tecnobus, in Frosinone, Italy. The Gulliver model is currently used in several cities in Canada, England, France, Germany, Italy, Portugal and Spain.

=== Netherlands ===
- Ebusco. Currently producing the 2.2 version in various styles and 3.0 lightweight bus is under development
- VDL Bus & Coach is marketleader of electrical buses in Europe (Sept 2017), with the largest fully electric fleet in the EU. The project of 43 SLFA-181 electrical buses in late 2016 was the biggest transition to zero emission within Europe. Currently the fleet consists of 204 articulated and 12-meter e-buses, with over 4,5 million kilometers done.

=== Poland ===
- City Smile electric bus designed and manufactured by AMZ-Kutno in Poland.
- Solaris Urbinos 8.9, 12 and 18 meters with about 100 km (60 miles) range and about 120 kWh battery pack, introduced in September 2011. Optional pantograph inductive.
- URSUS in Lublin, Poland, produces a range of electric buses and trolleybuses under the brand of its subsidiary Ursus Bus.

=== Portugal ===
- e.City Gold electric bus manufactured by Salvador Caetano in Portugal.with variants of 8.5m, 12m and 18m.

=== Russia ===
- KAMAZ, Naberezhnye Chelny, Russia: KAMAZ-6282 model production launched in 2018.
- LiAZ, Likino-Dulyovo, Russia: LiAZ-6274 model production launched in 2018.
- Volgabus, based in Volzhsky, Russia manufactures Volgabus-5270.E0 electric bus.
- Trans-Alfa, in Vologda, Russia, as of 2024 has two models of electric buses, Sirius and Orion, former being operated in Rybinsk and ordered by Saint Petersburg while latter hasn't been put into serial production yet.

=== Spain ===
- Irizar e-mobility, in Aduna, Gipuzkoa, Spain: Comprehensive turnkey electromobility solutions for cities. Manufacturer of the ie bus, ie tram and the ie truck

=== Sweden ===
- Scania, near Stockholm, Sweden. Scania Citywide BEV
- Volvo, based in Gothenburg, Sweden, manufactures battery electric buses.

=== Switzerland ===
- ABB TOSA Flash Mobility, Clean City, Smart Bus, Geneva, Switzerland, A mass transport system with electric "flash" partial recharging of the buses at selected bus stops.

=== Turkey ===
- Karsan, a Turkish commercial vehicles manufacturer, produces and sells Peugeot and Hyundai.
- Otokar
- Temsa in Turkey, 50% owned by Škoda Transportation developed two electric buses; one model with a high capacity battery pack and one model with quick charge capability. Also supplies bodies for Škoda Transportation.

=== Ukraine ===
- Electron in Lviv, Ukraine. Electrobus Е19101.

=== United Kingdom ===
- Alexander Dennis: Enviro100EV midibus, Enviro400EV two axle double-decker, Enviro500EV three axle double decker
- Kleanbus Limited: retrofits
- Optare: Solo EV, Versa EV.
- Mellor Coachcraft: Orion E low-floor electric minibus based on Fiat Ducato chassis
- Wrightbus: StreetDeck Electroliner, GB Kite Electroliner and existing Wrightbus retrofits; Rightech RB6 midibus and RB9 single-decker

== Asia ==
=== China ===
- BYD manufactures a wide range of electric buses, ranging from the 30-foot K7M to the 60-foot K11M. In addition, they manufacture coaches and double-decker electric buses.
  - The K9 is their flagship transit bus (with K9 and K10 chassis/powertrain also used by other bus makers e.g. Alexander Dennis as a basis for localised EV transit buses), and the C9 is their flagship coach bus.
- Jiangsu Alfa Bus company, Jiangsu, China, delivered in Italy by Rama Company.
- Wuzhoulong, based in Shenzhen, manufactures a range of urban battery electric buses
- Thunder Sky Energy Group of Shenzhen, China (near Hong Kong) builds lithium-ion batteries and has four models of electric buses, the ten passenger EV-6700 with a range of 260 km (160 mi), the TS-6100EV and TS-6110EV city buses (top speed 80 km/h), and the 43 passenger Thunder-Sky-EV-2008 highway bus (top speed 100 km/h), which has a range of 300 km (190 mi). The batteries can be recharged in one hour or replaced in five minutes. The buses are also to be built in the United States and Finland.
- Yinlong Energy Co., LTD, China, manufactures commercial bus and specialty EV vehicles
- Yutong, China, Largest EV bus manufacturer in the world.
- Zonda Bus, in Jiangsu, China: YCK6128HEC (12 m), YCK6118HEC (11 m) and the Zonda Bus New Energy (with a 500 km only-electric range and a battery lifespan of above 500,000 km).

=== South Korea ===
- Hyundai Motor Company manufactures 11-meter standard and 13-meter Double-decker bus derivatives of the electric Low-floor bus model, Elec City.

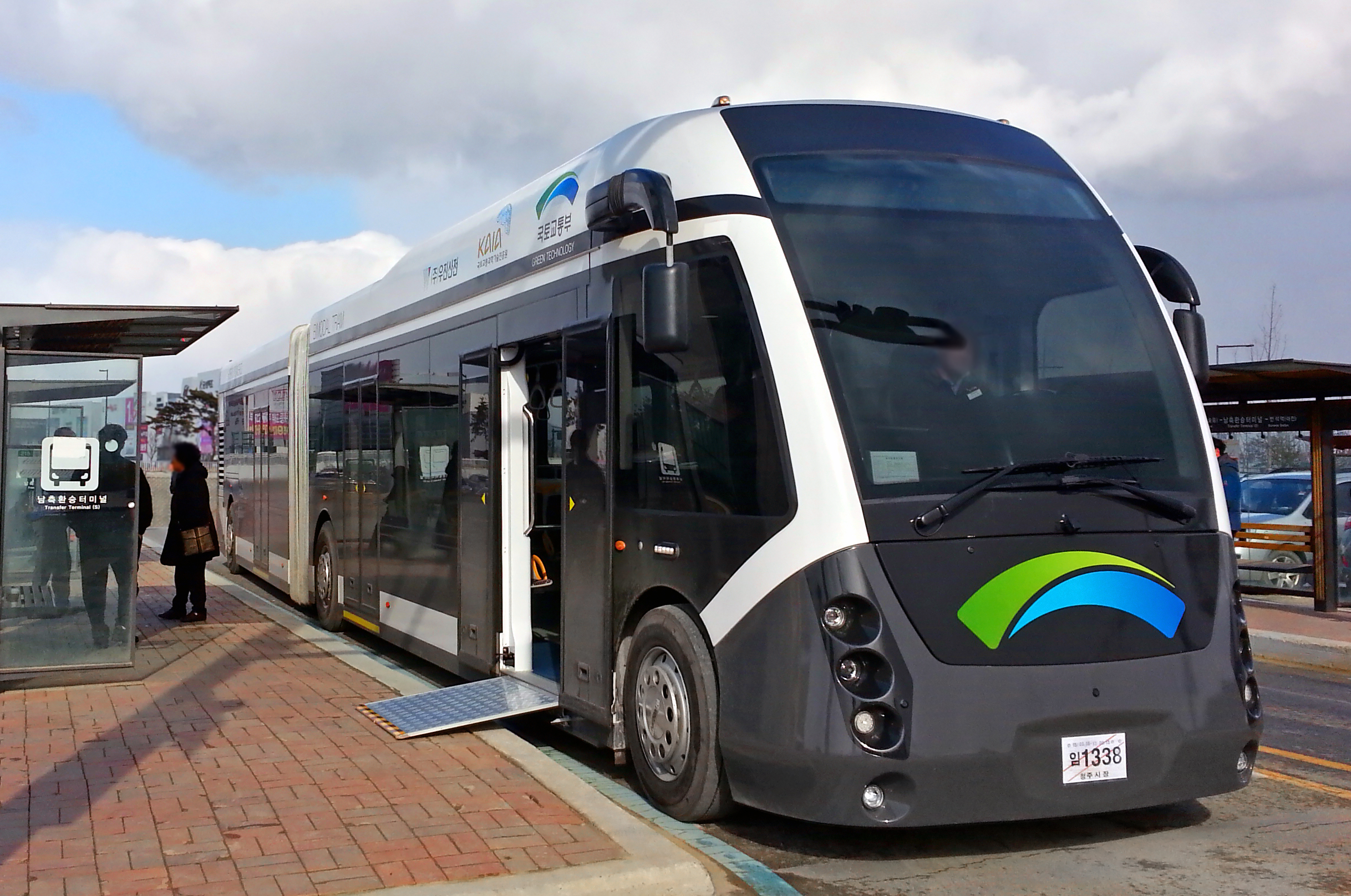
Woojin Apollo

- Woojin Industrial Systems, based in Goesan County, South Korea (Apollo 900 (9-meter low-floor), Apollo 1100 (11-meter low-floor))
- KGM Commercial based in Seoul

=== Vietnam ===
- THACO in District 2, Ho Chi Minh City.

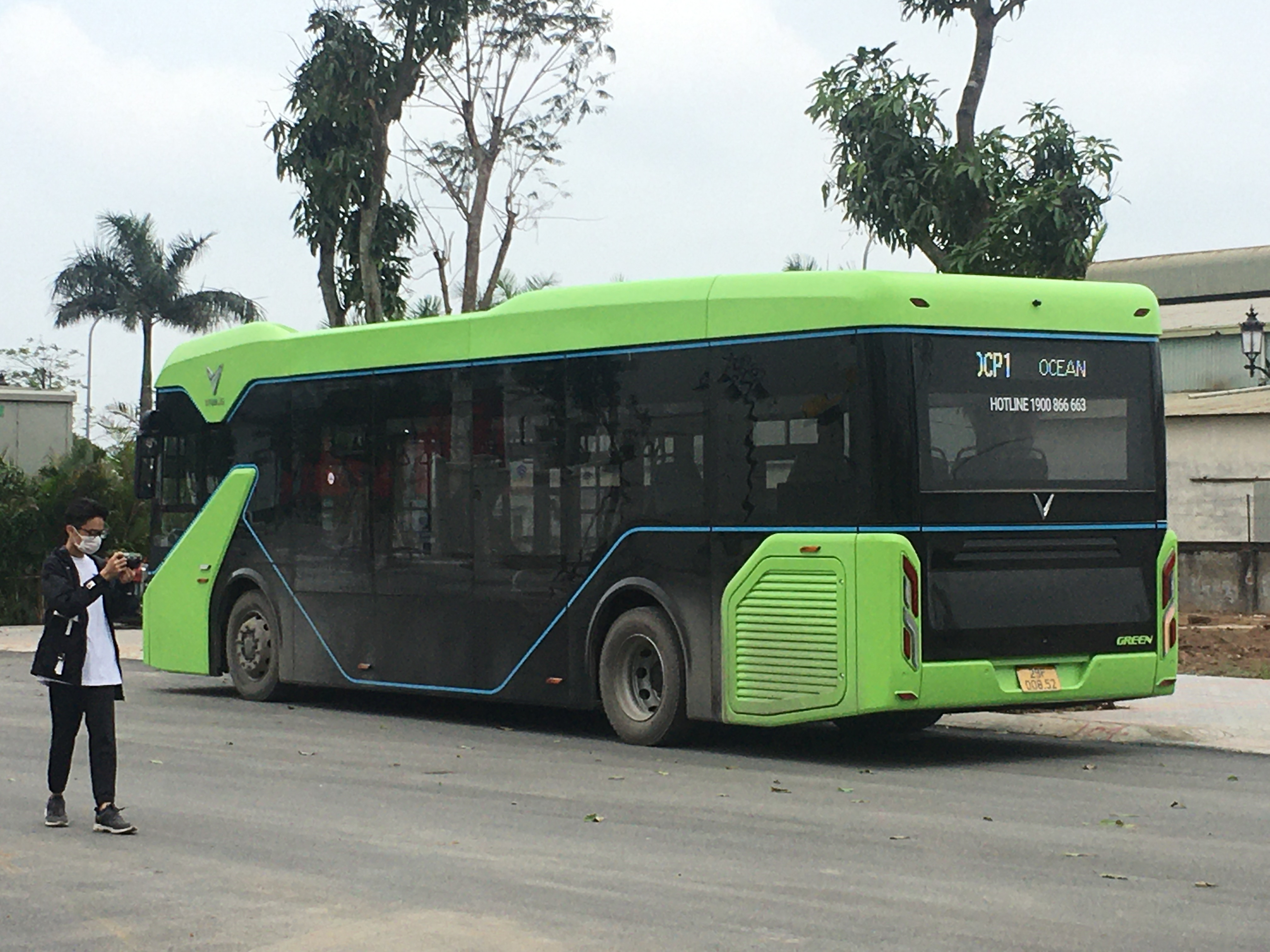
VinBus from Vietnam

- VinBus from VinFast.

=== India ===
- Tata Motors manufactures Starbus EV, Ultra EV and Magna EV buses
- EKA Mobility
- JBM Auto
- PMI Mobility
- Switch Mobility Ashok Leyland Subsidiary is Makes large number Ev buses in india

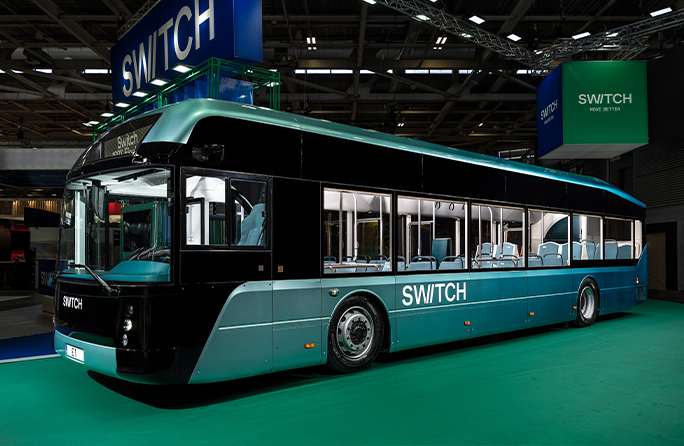
Switch E1 at Switch Mobility Vehicle

- Olectra

== Oceania ==
=== Australia ===
- Avass, Full electric city buses and touring coaches, manufactured in Australia.
- Custom Denning in Sydney, Australia. Design and production of Custom Denning Element fully low-floor battery-electric or fuel cell citybus.

=== New Zealand ===
- Environmental Performance Vehicles(EPV), previously known as DesignLine, in New Zealand: Tindo solar-electric bus prototype, EcoSmart electric bus, EcoSaver Range extender bus.

== Other ==
- BONLUCK electric bus designed and manufactured by Jiangxi Kama Business Bus Co., Ltd.
- Chariot Motors* is a developer of ultracapacitor-based electric buses and battery e-buses for Bulgaria and Israel.
- SOR EBNs SOR EBN and NS electric busses A modern, low-floor electric bus designed for clean passenger transit in urban environments. A modern all-low-floor electric bus
- Van Hool's CX45E is based on the diesel-powered CX45, but uses a Proterra E2 drivetrain.
- Vėjo projektai, based in Klaipėda, Lithuania, creates, develops and manufactures battery electric buses with the brand name "Dancer" Fully electric 12-meter Dancer buses, certified and registered in 2019, have been operating on Klaipėda's regular routes since spring 2020 with nearly 100,000 km completed by the end of the year. The e-bus Dancer, designed and manufactured within the territory of Klaipėda FEZ, also won the gold medal in the Vehicle, Mobility and Transportation Design category of the prestigious A’Design 2020 awards.
- Olectra Greentech in India
- Salvador Caetano provides their Caetano City Gold in battery electric variant, along with electric hybrid and diesel variants.
- Mitsubishi Heavy Industries is developing electric buses that are capable of battery swapping.
- Mobil Anak Bangsa (MAB) produces plug-in electric buses at Demak, Indonesia. First bus delivered to Paiton Energy.
- Kayoola Solar Electric Bus by Kiira Motors Corporation (KMC) in Uganda.

== See also ==
- List of electric truck makers
- Electric vehicle conversion
