= Pigalle, Paris =

Area of Paris, France

Coordinates: 48°52′56.20″N 2°20′14.50″E

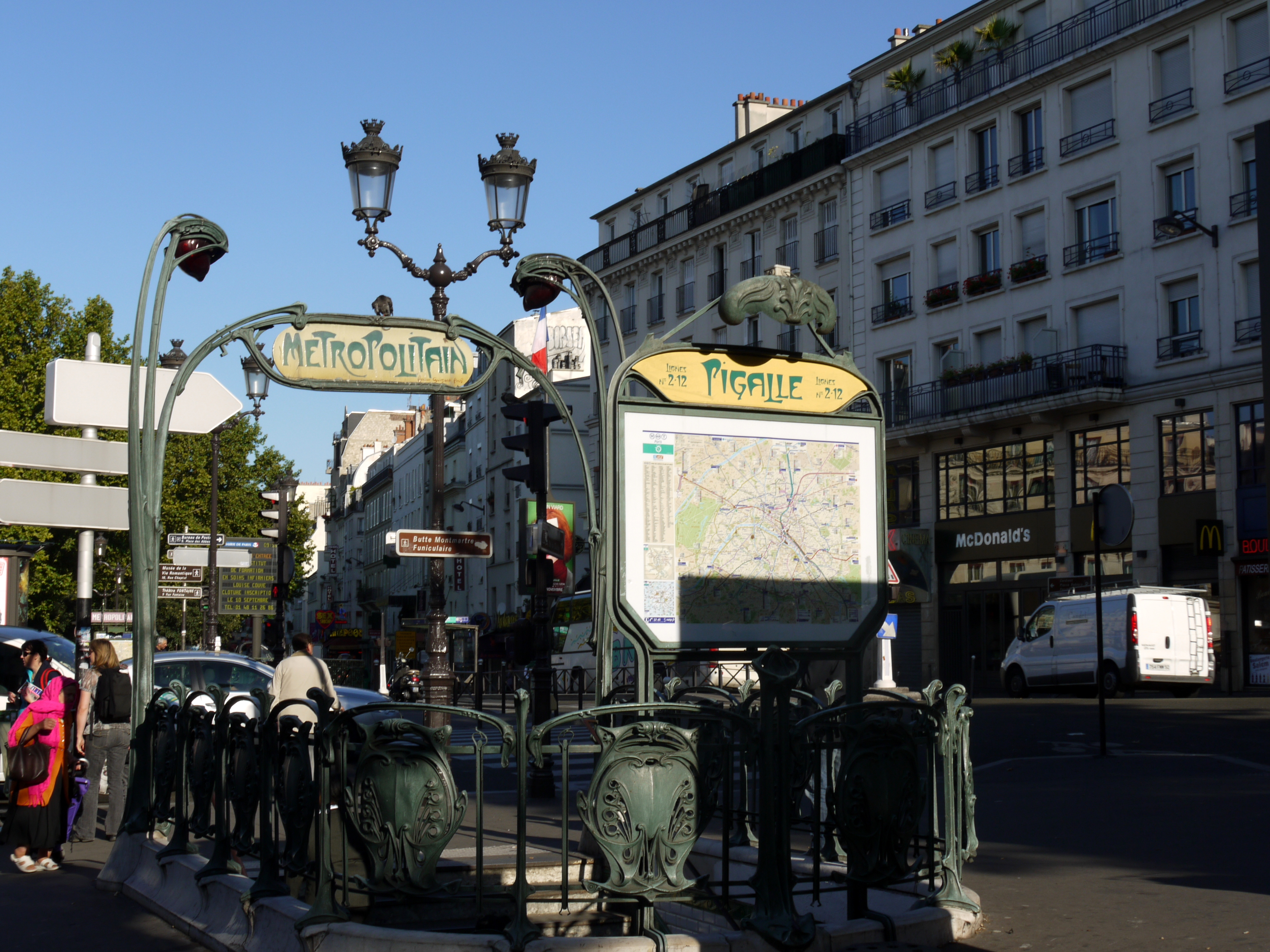
Entrance to the Paris metro in Pigalle

Pigalle (French pronunciation: [piɡal]) is an area in Paris, France, around the Place Pigalle, on the border between the 9th and the 18th arrondissements. It is named after the sculptor Jean-Baptiste Pigalle (1714–1785).

Pigalle is famous for being a tourist district, with many sex shops, theatres and adult shows on Place Pigalle and the main boulevards. The neighbourhood's raunchy reputation led to its Second World War nickname of "Pig Alley" by Allied soldiers. Le Divan du Monde and the Moulin Rouge, a world-famous cabaret, are both located in Pigalle.

== History ==
Henri Toulouse-Lautrec's studio was here. Pablo Picasso, Vincent van Gogh and Maurice Neumont also lived here, as did André Breton, and in 1928 Josephine Baker opened her first nightclub next door to Breton's apartment.

American-born jazz singer Adelaide Hall lived in Pigalle in 1937–1938 and opened her nightclub La Grosse Pomme ("the Big Apple") at 73 Rue Pigalle. Other nightclubs in Rue Pigalle during the late 1930s included the Moon Rousse and Caravan, where Django Reinhardt played.

It was the home of the Grand Guignol theatre, which closed in 1962. However, the theatre building still stands.

Pigalle is well known to tourists who want to experience "Paris by night". It is home to some of Paris' most famous cabarets (the Moulin Rouge, for instance, was immortalised by artist Toulouse-Lautrec as well as Hollywood), as well as topless and nude shows.

The area to the south of Place Pigalle is devoted to musical instruments and equipment shops, especially for popular music. A section of the rue de Douai consists solely of stores selling guitars, drums and musical accessories.

Pigalle was one end-point of the RATP Montmartrobus (Autobus électrique Gépébus Oréos 55E, now public bus #40 serving the area) and is at the Pigalle stop of the Paris Métro.

== In popular culture ==
- Georges Ulmer wrote Pigalle in 1946, and performed it himself.
- Maurice Chevalier wrote a song entitled "Place Pigalle".
- Édith Piaf made an album titled La Rue Pigalle.
- Bill Ramsey sang a song entitled "Pigalle" in the 1961 Austrian film The Adventures of Count Bobby directed by Géza von Cziffra.
- The police comedy My New Partner (1984) is set in Pigalle.
- Singer/songwriter Grant Hart describes buying heroin in Pigalle in his 1989 track "The Main".
- The French rapper Stomy Bugsy released a track named "J'suis né à Pigalle" on his album 4ème Round (2003).
- The American jazz singer Madeleine Peyroux's album Bare Bones (2009) contains a track entitled "Our Lady of Pigalle".
- The American pop band Sparks mentioned the district in the lyrics of "Sextown U.S.A.".
- The French luxury shoe designer Christian Louboutin has named one of his shoe models "Pigalle".
- The French DJ DJ Snake released a track named "Pigalle" on his album Encore (2016).
- In Grand Theft Auto V, a classic French sports car is named the Pigalle.
- In the film Midnight in Paris, when walking with Gil, Adriana mentions that she and her roommate paid a girl from Pigalle to "come and teach us all her tricks".
- The Italian pop band Matia Bazar mentioned the district in the lyrics of "Souvenir".
- The Italian songwriter Achille Lauro released a track named "Marilù" in which he mentions the Pigalle ("Una notte a Pigalle").
- The French singer and songwriter Barbara Pravi released a track named "Pigalle" on her album Reviens pour l'hiver (2020).
- The British singer and songwriter Morrissey released a track named "The Monsters of Pig Alley" on his album Make-Up Is a Lie.
