= Road-powered electric vehicle =

Road powered electric vehicles (RPEV) (sometimes called roadway powered electric vehicles) collect any form of potential energy from the road surface to supply electricity to locomotive motors and ancillary equipment within the vehicle.

== Definition ==
A Road Powered electric vehicle may be defined as a transport capsule with the following characteristics:

1. The principal means of locomotion is one or more electric motor(s)
2. The electric motors are powered by an electrical supply provided either from a battery (usually on-board) or power source (typically remote, and connected directly via conductive cables or magnetic inductive fields
3. There is a defined roadway over which the vehicle travels (that means, although it may have some on-board battery reserve, is not intended to be a cross country vehicle)
4. Where an external electric supply is provided, this is typically with overhead conductors or above-ground rails or (rarely) sub-surface electro-magnets.
5. An all-electric vehicle typically requires one or more on-board energy supply elements or devices for autonomous operation, most commonly by chemical batteries, less frequently via electro-mechanical generators
6. The electric vehicle further may include an on-board control system that directs energy from the energy storage elements, as needed, and converts such energy to electric motors used to propel the electric vehicle.

A Road Powered Electric Vehicle therefore necessarily includes a system for supplying electricity from an external power source (such as a remote power station) through a network of power coupling elements which provide an integral and continuous power connection between origin and destination.

== Wireless energy transfer ==
In USA Patent 6421600 these power coupling elements are electro-magnetic transmission coils embedded in the roadway and reception coils which are electrically resonant, so that they convert the magnetic flux above the road into electrical energy on the vehicle, which is entirely independent, since there is no mechanical or electrical link. The patent version of RPEV cited also includes:

1. an on-board power meter to indicate the approximate consumption and an approximation of its remaining autonomous (battery) endurance or ranger range
2. a wide bandwidth communications channel to allow information signals to be sent to, and received from, the RPEV while it is in use;
3. automated garaging, a system that automatically connects power to the RPEV when it is in storage overnight, both to recharge the on-board batteries and power the on-board storage heater in cold weather so that it is comfortable for the driver and passengers.
4. electronic coupling between two or more RPEVs so that one can be a "master" (with a driver) and the following vehicle(s) are "slave" (controlled by the driver in the "master" vehicle) as a sort of "road train" in order to increase passenger or payload capacity.
5. a positioning system for determining the current location of the RPEV; and
6. a scheduling and dispatch computer so that many RPEV's can be accommodated efficiently on any particular length of road with embedded transmission coils. Such a system could be adapted for use with remote drivers or automatic control over closed roadway circuits such as warehouses and theme parks.

Online Electric Vehicles (OHVs) use pick-up equipment underneath the vehicle then collects power through non-contact magnetic induction, which may imply a similar electrical design.

== Wired energy transfer ==
Tram and 'Trackless Car' share common overhead lines (from Harmsworth Popular Science)

Trolleybuses use overhead cables which could also be used for cars, as shown in a photograph (right) carried by an encyclopedic magazine about 1910.

=== Overhead power lines ===
The twin overhead power lines are usually copper conductors with a flat surface, which are supported by a steel catenary wire. A pole or pantograph extends from the vehicle and presses 'slippers' or 'skates' against the conductors to complete the circuit. These slipper or skate contacts are frequently coated with graphite, or have a carbon block to reduce friction and ensure a good (low resistance) electrical connection.

Since buses are scheduled, traffic conflicts are rare. If the overhead dual power line infrastructure was used randomly by private users, then some sort of management system would be required. The simplest would be to provide the vehicles some limited autonomy so that they could simply disconnect when arriving at each intersection and reconnect when they joined the next section. A more sophisticated traffic management system, as proposed by USA Patent 6421600 (above) could facilitate transit where there are many vehicles wishing to draw power from a particular section of the infrastructure.

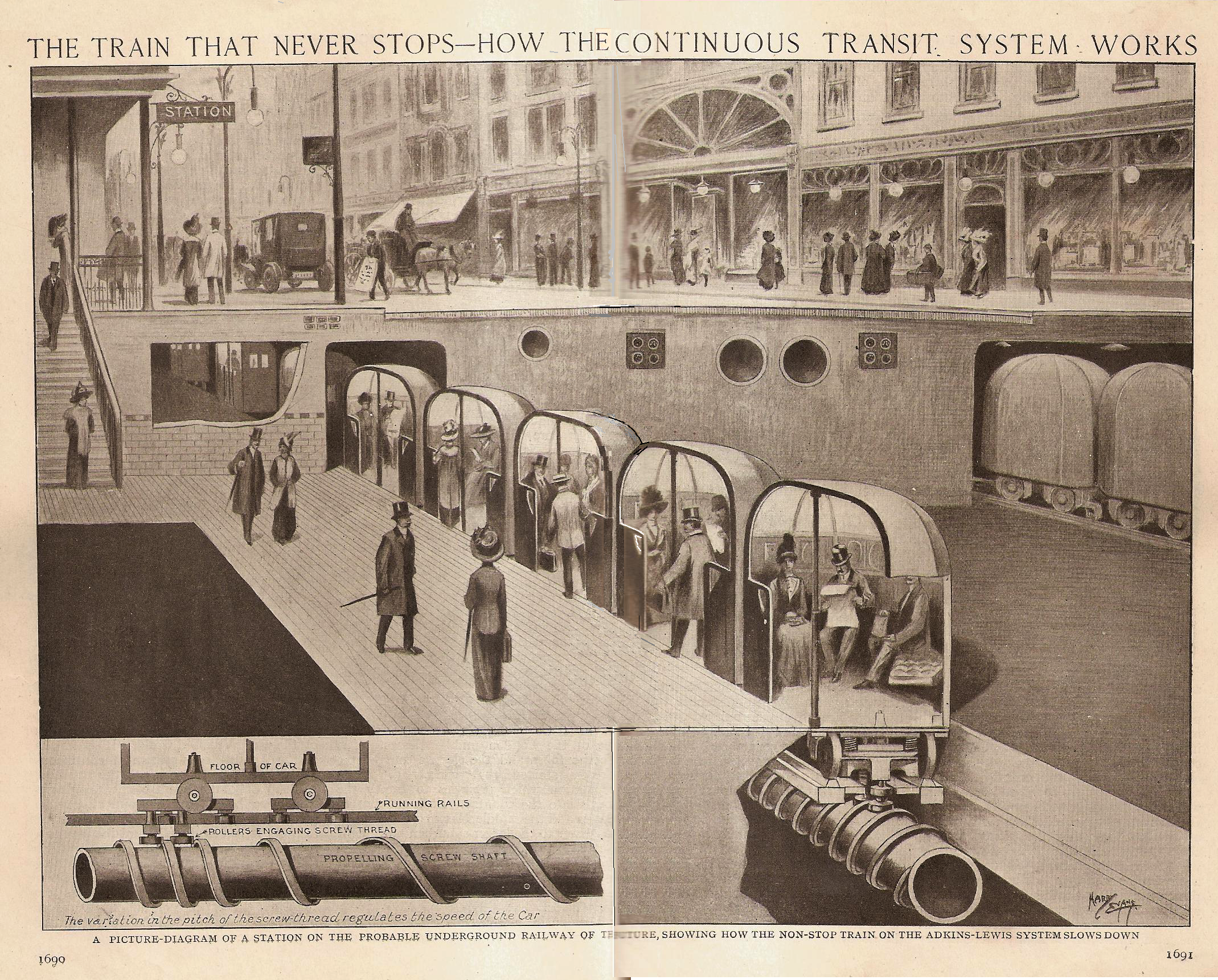
Diagram of a possible mechanical transmission train (from Harmsworth Popular Science Volume 3, c.1913)

Recent improvements in trolleybus design include the automatic connection and disconnection of power poles either by the driver or in the event of mechanical dis-engagement from the overhead wires, so that the driver can remain in control, using on-board battery power. Better materials and motion dynamics modeling allow speeds up to about 80 km/h so that trolleybus behavior is flexible and totally comparable with regular autonomous vehicle performance, even at crossings and road-junctions

=== Ground-level power supply ===
Ground-level power supply is an alternative to overhead power lines. The most common version is the conduit current collection system, where the power supply is carried in a channel or vault under the roadway. This is a tube, open at the top to allow a blade to enter and extend slippers against the power conductors, which are either side of the access opening slot, near the top of the channel. The arrangement is shaped so that live surfaces can not be reached by hand, and the lower part of the conduit provides drainage to remove any water.

Conduit power was first designed in the steam age (c.1900) when power was transmitted mechanically from a series of steam-powered rotating screws, as shown in the illustration (left) also published by Harmsworth Popular Science.

A more recent roadway power supply design used by the Bordeaux tramway involves alternate (line and neutral) panels which are only powered whilst they are actually under the tram. This system is called APS (French: Alimentation par Sol which implies sub-surface power feed in English).

=== Overhead electrical net ===
A parking area with an overhead electrical net was in use at Seoul Grand Park Zoo in South Korea, to recharge electric vehicles, This was similar to a fairground bumper car arrangement which allowed vehicle batteries to be recharged, prior to introduction of the more modern OLEV Online Electric Vehicle system. The advantage was that vehicles could be parked randomly, as convenient, and there was no need for either the tripping hazard of trailing cables used by most electric vehicles nor for fiddly precise alignment of conductor poles needed by trolley buses.

== Linear Motor Propulsion ==
An alternative form of electro-magnetic coupling is called a linear motor, first developed by Professor Eric Laithwaite at Imperial College London in the 1960s.

Instead of supplying electric motors with power directly or charging on-board batteries, the RPEV is fitted with magnets which are impelled horizontally in the same way as the rotor on an ordinary electric motor is impelled to rotate. A linear motor works in exactly the same way a round motor which has been split to its centre, laid flat and extended.

The Shanghai Transrapid and Bombardier Advanced Rapid Transit systems are practical examples of this type of RPEV technology applied to rail transport systems (which are sometimes called railroads, especially in USA).

Maglev uses magnetic repulsion to support the carriage weight as well as to propel the vehicle forward, so wheels are not needed. Maglev trains effectively ride on top of a magnetic wave, much as a surfer rides a wave on the sea.

== See also ==
- Platoon (automobile) ('car train' private vehicles travelling in convoy)
- Intelligent transportation system
- Driverless car
- Battery electric vehicle
- Online Electric Vehicle
- Electric vehicle battery
- Better Place
- Dashaveyor
- Automated guided vehicle
- Automated storage and retrieval system
- Exchange station
- Patent encumbrance of large automotive NiMH batteries
- Power-to-weight ratio
- Traction battery
- Traction motor
- Vehicle-to-grid (V2G)
- Battery recycling
