= BYD C9 =

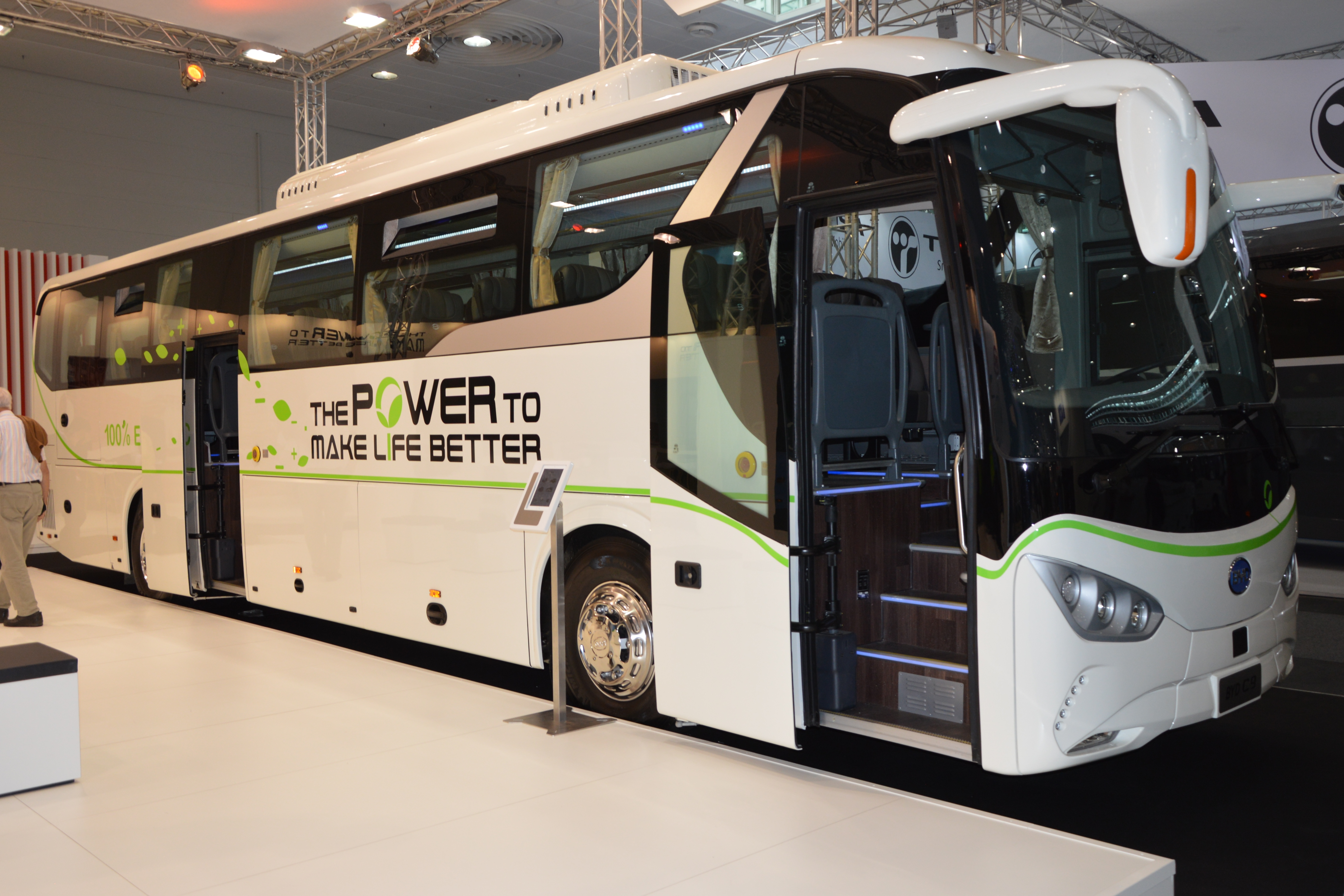

Overview
- Manufacturer: Changsha BYD Coach Company, Ltd (a Shenzhen BYD Auto Company, Ltd. subsidiary)
- Production: 2015-present
- Assembly: Changsha, Hunan, China; Lancaster, California, United States; Dalian, Liaoning, China

Body and chassis
- Class: battery electric coach

Powertrain
- Engine: Wheel hub electric motors
- Battery: 365 kWh
- Plug-in charging: 80 kW AC, 200 kW DC

Dimensions
- Length: 12 m (39.4 ft) over bumpers
- Width: 2.50 m (8 ft 2.4 in) over body
- Height: 3.53 m (11.6 ft) over roof battery
- Curb weight: 13,000 kg (28,660 lb) curb weight

The BYD C9 is a battery electric coach manufactured by the Chinese automaker BYD.

== History ==
Since 2010, BYD Auto, the global leader in electric vehicles, builds buses with electric drive.

The construction of battery buses focused until 2015 exclusively on city bus used in short-distance traffic with the usually reduced level of comfort in these vehicles. With the presentation of the BYD C9 in January 2015 at the bus fair UMA Motorcoach EXPO in New Orleans, for the first time an electric touring coach was introduced, which is also suitable for urban traffic.

In Europe, the vehicle was first presented in June 2016 at the French trade fair transport publics. The first buyer was Green Yvelines ; another bus company near Paris, which has ordered twelve vehicles. Like other major cities, the city of Paris intends to stop diesel vehicles from entering the city center starting in 2020. In China, around 100 vehicles will be used (as of the end of 2016).

Since October 2018 Flixbus uses the C9 with 40 seats on the route between Frankfurt and Mannheim via Frankfurt Airport and Heidelberg in regular service, where it operates four times a day. The distance is 115 km (71 mi); the bus has a range of 320 km (200 mi). The bus is charged once or twice a day and during the night with 2 × 40 kW with green electricity.

== Competitors ==
- Motor Coach Industries
  - J4500e
  - D45 CRTe LE
- Van Hool
  - CX35E
  - CX45E
