= Power Vehicle Innovation =

French electric and natural gas bus and truck manufacturer

PVI
- Industry: Manufacturing
- Founded: 2000
- Founder: Ponticelli Frères
- Headquarters: Gretz-Armainvilliers, France
- Key people: Michel Bouton (CEO)
- Products: Trucks; Buses
- Services: Maintenance
- Revenue: €30M (2010)
- Number of employees: 140 (2010)
- Parent: PVI Holding
- Website: pvi.fr

Power Vehicle Innovation or PVI is a French truck and bus manufacturer, based in Gretz-Armainvilliers near Paris, France, specialized in electric powertrains.

== History ==
PVI is a former subsidiary of Ponticelli Frères. Its current stockholders are the Marcel Dassault Industrial Group, the financial institution Centuria Capital and a business management holding company (Sovibus). PVI has been the first company in France to market Electric buses, like the Oréos 55E, which is used by the RATP on a touristic bus line in Paris, the Montmartrobus. More than half of the French electric buses in circulation in 2003 have been distributed by PVI.

== Products ==
=== WATT System ===
Wireless Alternative Trolley Technology system from Power Vehicle Innovation (PVI) is a solution for electric buses that does not require catenaries. It was presented at the Transports Public 2014, the International Mobility Exhibition in Paris. The technology can be used to charge an electric bus in a few seconds at each stop and overcome the limited range of electric buses. It uses an automated rapid-charging system combined with supercapacitors and where necessary, relayed by backup batteries.

Nice Côte d'Azur Airport will experiment with the Watt System solution under actual conditions. Connecting the two airport terminals at Nice, the demonstrator will rely on 7 totem poles (or recharge terminals) spread between the different stops along the route.

=== Electric vehicles ===
PVI manufactures and distributes the following electric vehicles:

- Oréos 2X, 22-places urban electric bus, with an average range of 120 kilometres
- Oréos 4X, 49-places urban electric bus, with an average range of 120 kilometres
- 26T electric chassis, heavy electric truck used for household waste collection, streets cleaning, etc. It has a 9 tonne payload, a 255 kWh battery and lower noise than a diesel truck.

Furthermore, PVI integrates electric drivelines in the Renault Maxity Electric (Renault Trucks,) a 3.5T delivery vehicle dedicated to urban environments.

== See also ==
- Supercondenser
