= Oréos 2X =

French electric minibus

Oreos 2X
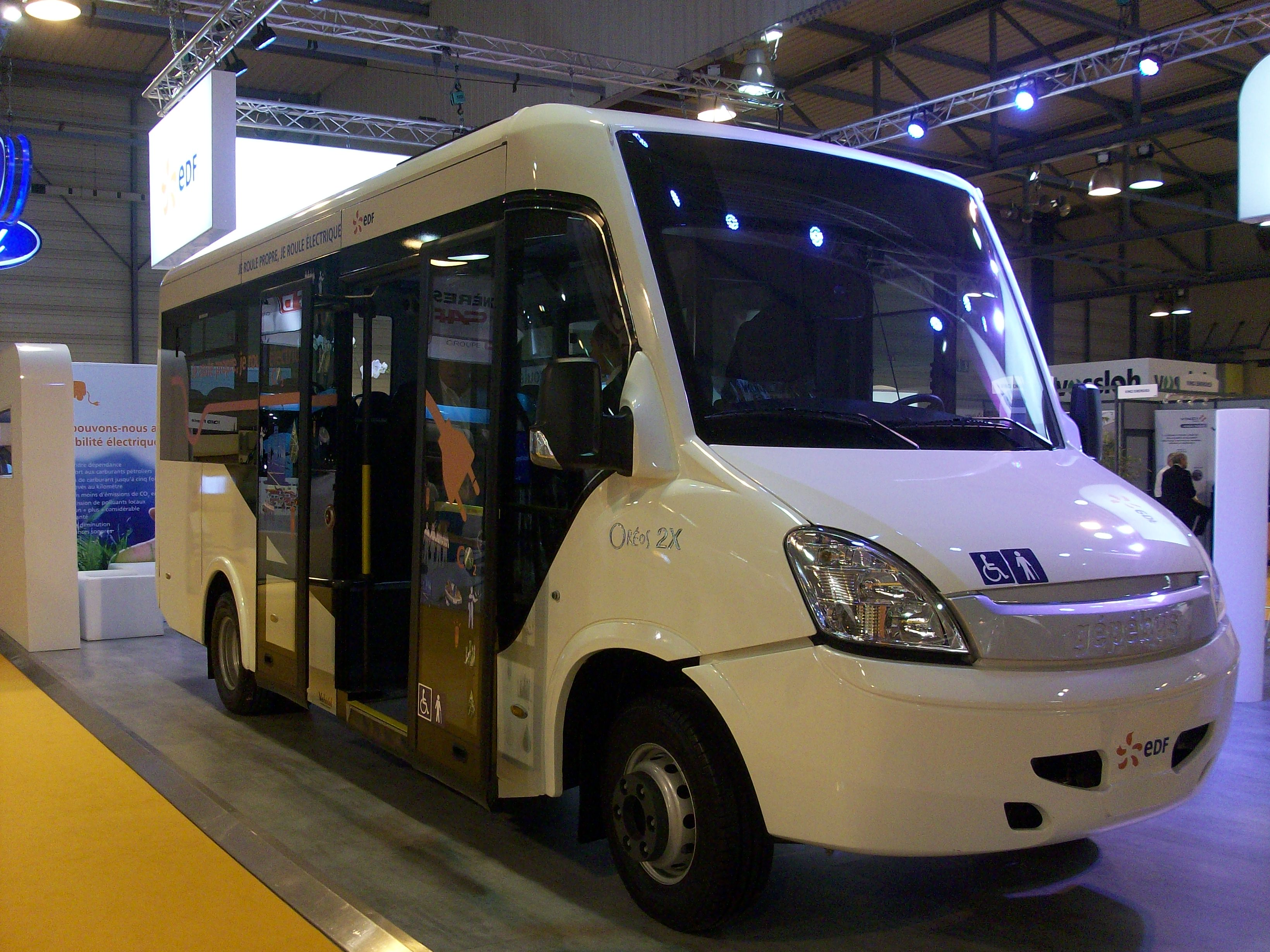

Overview
- Manufacturer: Power Vehicle Innovation

Body and chassis
- Doors: 1 door
- Floor type: Low floor

Powertrain
- Engine: asynchronous
- Capacity: 22 persons (including 13 seats)

Dimensions
- Length: 7,243 mm (23 ft 9 1/8 in)
- Width: 2,170 mm (7 ft 1 3/8 in)
- Height: 2,867 mm (9 ft 4 7/8 in)
- Curb weight: 4,100 kg (9,000 lb) (empty); 6,500 kg (14,300 lb) (GVWR)

The Oreos 2X is a 22-place electric low-floor minibus of the Gepebus line, made by Power Vehicle Innovation. The Oreos 2X is among the first electric vehicles of this kind to be produced in France. Entirely electric, this minibus lowers the environmental impact of transport for local authorities or private actors in need of this kind of vehicle, also maybe have the Iveco Daily chassis.

== Technical characteristics ==
- Maximal speed: more than 70 km/h (43 mph)
- Range: 120 km (75 mi)
- Energy recovery rate (during brake or deceleration phases) : around 20%

The Oreos 2X uses lithium-ion batteries which can be recharged without the use of a battery charger, because this charger is included in the bus.

== Equipment ==
The Oreos 2X has been designed for the transportation of a maximum number of 22 people, including 13 seated places. The bus can also be equipped with a disabled people access system.

== Operation ==
Oreos 2X are running in the public transport network of the cities of Provins (Seine-et-Marne, France) operated by Procars, and in the city of Chevreuse (Yvelines, France), operated by SAVAC.

== See also ==
- Electric bus
- Oréos 4X
- Gepebus
- Power Vehicle Innovation
- List of buses
