= Gepebus =

Brand name for electric buses

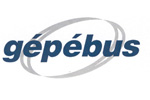
Gepebus logo

Gépébus is a trademarked private sector brand name for electric autobuses made by Power Vehicle Innovation for use in mass public transportation.

== History ==
In the 1990s Power Vehicle Innovation was among the first to offer fully electric buses, namely the Oréos 22 and Oréos 55 (Montmartrobus operated by the RATP in Paris' 18th arrondissement (Montmartre) being one example).

== Products ==
- The Oréos 2X : a 22-places electric minibus with a range of 120 km.
- The Oréos 4X : a 49-places electric midibus with a range of 120 km.
