= Oréos 4X =

French electric midibus

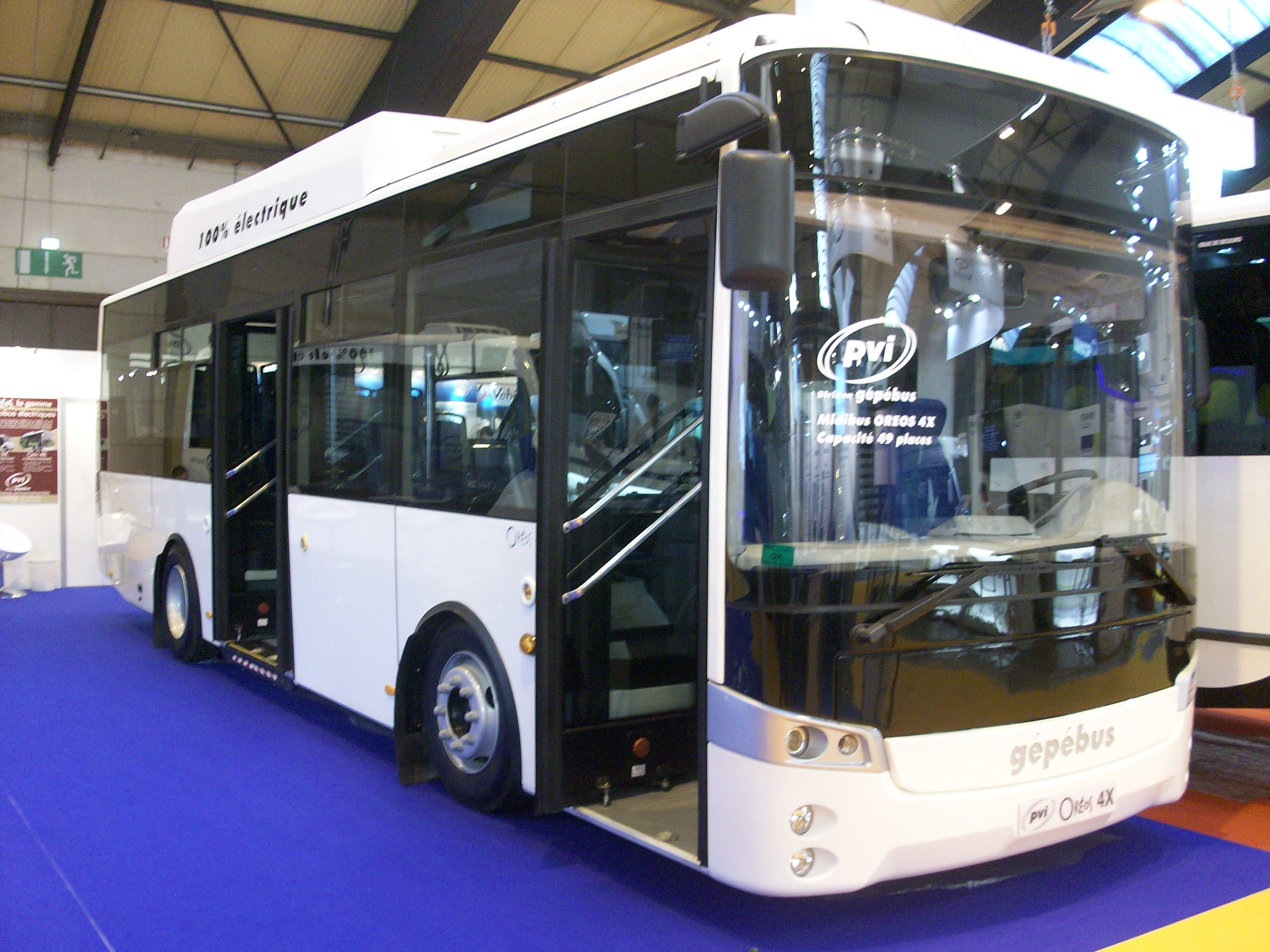

Overview
- Manufacturer: Power Vehicle Innovation

Body and chassis
- Doors: 2
- Floor type: Low floor

Powertrain
- Engine: Induction motor
- Capacity: 49 persons (including 25 seats)

Dimensions
- Length: 9,312 mm (30 ft 6 5/8 in)
- Width: 2,350 mm (7 ft 8 1/2 in)
- Height: 3,336 mm (10 ft 11 3/8 in)
- Curb weight: 9,100 kg (20,100 lb) (empty); 13,500 kg (29,800 lb) (GVWR)

The Oréos 4X is a 49-places electric midibus of the Gepebus' line of products, from Power Vehicle Innovation. Made for the operating of some urban regular lines, or also a private usage (for example airport shuttles), the Oreos 4X is among the first entirely electric autobuses produced in France. This clean vehicle belongs to a new generation, more efficient for the power than the older models, and therefore helps to reduce the environmental impact of the transport in the cities.

== Technical characteristics ==
- Maximal speed : more than 70 km/h (43 mph)
- Range : 120 km (75 mi)
- Energy recovery rate (during brake or deceleration phases) : around 20%

The Oreos 4X uses lithium-ion batteries which can be recharged without the use of a separate battery charger, as a charger is included in the bus.

== Equipment ==
The Oreos 4X has been designed for the transportation of a maximum number of 49 people, including 25 seated places. The bus can also be equipped with a disabled people access system.

== Operation ==
The city of Coulommiers (Seine-et-Marne) through Transdev currently operates some Oreos 4X.

== See also ==
- Electric bus
- Oréos 2X
- Gepebus
- Power Vehicle Innovation
- List of buses
