= KGM Commercial =

South Korean vehicle manufacturer

KGM Commercial Co., Ltd.
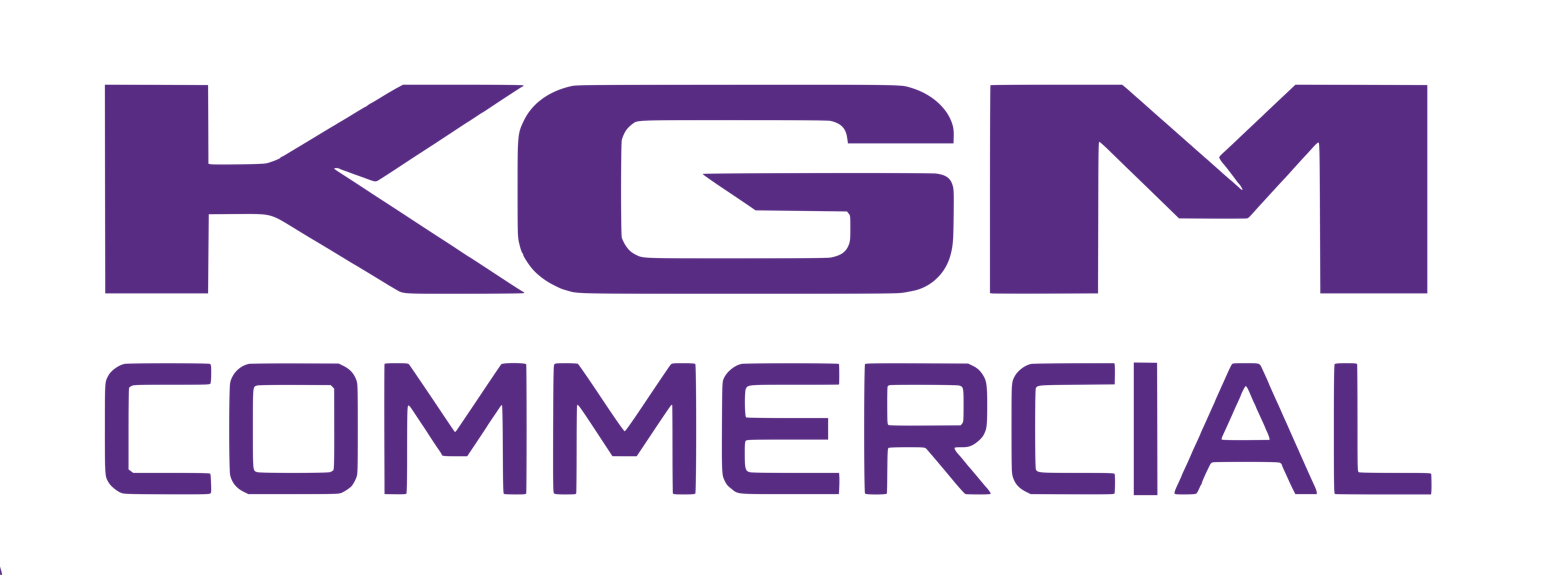
- Native name: KGM커머셜 주식회사
- Company type: Public
- Industry: Automotive industry
- Founded: February 1997; 29 years ago
- Headquarters: Seoul, South Korea
- Products: Electric bus
- Parent: KGM
- Website: kg-mobilitycommercial.com (in Korean)

KGM Commercial (KGMC; Korean: KGM커머셜) is a South Korean commercial vehicle and passenger vehicle manufacturing company.

== History ==
In October 2015, the vehicle division of Hankuk Fiber (한국화이바) was sold to Taichi and changed to Taichi Green Motors, and it was sold to the South Korean company EES (now Energy Solutions) in January 2017 and changed its name to Edison Motors. On September 26, 2023, the company name was changed to KGM Commercial.

Five SMART 110E medium-sized buses were exported to Paraguay as part of the South Korean government's official development assistance for Paraguay. It is the first export case since KG Commercial was incorporated into the KG Group.

== Facilities ==
The factory is located in Hamyang County, South Gyeongsang Province, and on August 19, 2021, the second factory, Gunsan Factory, was established in Gunsan City, North Jeolla Province. The factory produces shortened electric buses.

== Models ==
=== Current model ===
- KGM Commercial C
- KGM Commercial Smart

=== Discontinued model ===
- Hankuk Fiber Primus
- KGM Smart 087
- KGM Smart 093
- KGM Smart 110H
- KGM Smart 110HG

== See also ==
- KGM
- Hyundai Motor Company
- Kia
- Woojin Industrial Systems
