= List of Sechs Kies concert tours =

The South Korean idol group Sechs Kies (also known as SechsKies or Sechskies) has held four tours and four fan meetings since their debut in 1997.

== 1997 - 1999 Tours ==
Date	Title	City	Country	Venue	Attendance
December 21, 1997	First Live Concert	Seoul	South Korea	Sejong Center	7,600
February 22, 1998	Encore Concert	Seoul	South Korea	Olympic Gymnastics Arena	11,000
February 28, 1998	Tour in Korea	Busan	South Korea	KBS Hall	4,000
March 8, 1998	Tour in Korea	Ulsan	South Korea	KBS Hall	3,000
March 14, 1998	Tour in Korea	Gwangju	South Korea	Gudong Gymnasium	3,000
March 22, 1998	Tour in Korea	Bucheon	South Korea	Bucheon Gymnasium	
March 28, 1998	Tour in Korea	Daegu	South Korea	Woobang Tower Land	2,500
April 5, 1998	Tour in Korea	Daejeon	South Korea	EXPO Art Hall	1,500
December 24, 1998	Christmas Concert	Busan	South Korea	Busan Sajik Baseball Stadium	14,100
February 6, 1999	Ulsan Concert	Ulsan	South Korea	KBS Hall	3,000
February 21, 1999	Daegu Concert	Daegu	South Korea	Kyungpook National University	4,900
February 25, 1999	Seoul Concert	Seoul	South Korea	KBS 88 Gymnasium	19,000
February 26, 1999	Seoul Concert	Seoul	South Korea	KBS 88 Gymnasium	19,000
February 27, 1999	Seoul Concert	Seoul	South Korea	KBS 88 Gymnasium	19,000
February 28, 2000	Seoul Concert	Seoul	South Korea	Olympic Gymnastics Arena	11,000
Total					90,000

== 2016: Yellow Note Tours ==
Date	Title	City	Country	Venue	Attendance
September 10, 2016	Yellow Note	Seoul	South Korea	Olympic Gymnastics Arena	22,000
September 11, 2016	Yellow Note	Seoul	South Korea	Olympic Gymnastics Arena	22,000
December 10, 2016	Yellow Note	Daegu	South Korea	Daegu EXCO	6,100
December 24, 2016	Yellow Note	Busan	South Korea	BEXCO	8,000
December 25, 2016	Yellow Note	Busan	South Korea	BEXCO	8,000
January 21, 2017	Yellow Note	Seoul	South Korea	Jamsil Indoor Stadium	13,000
January 22, 2017	Yellow Note	Seoul	South Korea	Jamsil Indoor Stadium	13,000
Total					49,100

== 2017: Yellowkies Day & 20th Anniversary Tours ==
Date	Title	City	Country	Venue	Attendance
July 15, 2017 (Two shows)	YellowKies Day	Seoul	South Korea	SK Olympic Handball Gymnasium	14,000
July 23, 2017 (Two shows)	YellowKies Day	Tokyo	Japan	Yokohama Bay Hall	2,000
September 3, 2017 (Two shows)	YellowKies Day	Osaka	Japan	Namba Hatch	2,400
September 23, 2017	SechsKies Awards	Seoul	South Korea	Gocheok Sky Dome	10,000
September 23, 2017	20th Anniversary Concert	Seoul	South Korea	Gocheok Sky Dome	16,000
December 9, 2017	20th Anniversary Concert	Gwangju	South Korea	KWU Universiade Gymnasium	7,000
December 23, 2017	20th Anniversary Concert	Goyang	South Korea	KINTEX	12,000
December 24, 2017	20th Anniversary Concert	Goyang	South Korea	KINTEX	12,000
December 30, 2017	20th Anniversary Concert	Busan	South Korea	BEXCO	4,000
January 6, 2018	20th Anniversary Concert	Daegu	South Korea	Daegu EXCO	6,100
Total					73,500

== Sechskies 2018 Concert : Now, Here, Again ==
Date	Title	City	Country	Venue	Attendance
October 13, 2018	Now, Here, Again	Seoul	South Korea	Olympic Gymnastics Arena	N/A
October 14, 2018	Now, Here, Again	Seoul	South Korea	Olympic Gymnastics Arena	N/A

== Sechskies 2020 Concert [Access] ==
Date	Title	City	Country	Venue	Note
March 6, 2020	Access	Seoul	South Korea	Kyung Hee University Grand Peace Palace	Cancelled
March 7, 2020	Access	Seoul	South Korea	Kyung Hee University Grand Peace Palace	Cancelled
March 8, 2020	Access	Seoul	South Korea	Kyung Hee University Grand Peace Palace	Cancelled
