= Korea Railways & Logistics Fair =

South Korean industry exhibition

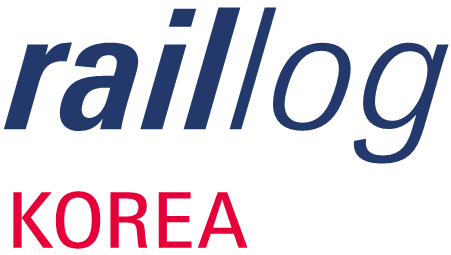
- Status: Active
- Genre: Rail transport
- Venue: BEXCO
- Location: Busan
- Country: South Korea
- Inaugurated: 2003
- Attendance: About 22,000
- Website: www.raillogkorea.com

The Korea Railways & Logistics Fair (Korean: 부산국제철도기술산업전) or RailLog Korea (레일로그 코리아) is Asia's first railway transportation exhibition held in Busan, South Korea. It is one of the world's four largest railway industry exhibitions.

== History ==
The Korea Railways & Logistics Fair has been held every other year since 2003. In 2007, it became the first in Asia to receive international exhibition certification from the Global Association of the Exhibition Industry (UFI).

=== 2003 ===
RailLog Korea 2003 was held from May 28 to June 1, 2003. It was held with the support of the Ministry of Commerce Industry and Energy, the Ministry of Construction & Transportation and KOTRA.

=== 2005 ===
RailLog Korea 2005 was held from June 8 to 11, 2005. 151 companies from 15 countries participated, and the general public was only allowed to enter on the 11th.

=== 2007 ===
RailLog Korea 2007 was held from June 16 to 19, 2007. 132 companies from 15 countries participated, and the United Nations Economic and Social Commission for Asia and the Pacific(UNESCAP) participated as an official sponsor of the event, as Busan is the starting point of the Trans-Asian Railway, which was discussed at the Transport Ministerial Meeting held in Busan in 2006.

Hyundai Rotem unveiled the KTX-II, a 350 km/h high-speed train jointly developed by its own engineers and 11 research institutes to be introduced on the Honam Line in 2009. Woojin Industrial Systems unveiled the world's fourth and the country's first fully unmanned, autonomous light rail vehicle.

=== 2009 ===
RailLog Korea 2009 was held from June 4 to 6, 2009, with 124 companies from 14 countries. The Deputy Minister of Transport of Ukraine, the head of Ukrainian Railways, the mayor of Vladivostok and his delegation, and the director of the Federal Ministry for Digital and Transport also visited.

Hyundai Rotem exhibited three types of actual railway vehicles. In particular, the KTX train developed as a national project was unveiled for the first time. Woojin Industrial Systems exhibited South Korea's first unmanned rubber-wheeled light rail vehicle to be deployed on the second stage of Busan Metro Line 3. Lowin showcased one type of railway vehicle and a monorail scheduled to be operated in the Wolmido Tourist Special Zone in Incheon.

=== 2011 ===
RailLog Korea 2011 was held from June 15 to 18, 2011, with 682 booths from 158 companies from 17 countries. Approximately 25,000 people were recorded to have visited.

Hyundai Rotem, Woojin Industrial Systems, and Rowin unveiled actual railway vehicles, while Korea Hwaiba and Sungshin RST displayed railway vehicles in the form of models and graphic panels: Hyundai Rotem exhibited for the first time in the country two types of export-type railway vehicles supplied to New Zealand and Greece. Woojin Industrial Systems presented the Smart Monorail, and Rowin introduced the SR001, an electric multiple unit for Seoul Subway Line 7. Overseas companies participating included Ansaldo Energia of Italy, Thales of Canada, and Hitachi of Japan.

=== 2013 ===
RailLog Korea 2013 was held from June 12 to 15, 2013, with 158 companies from 20 countries participating.

Hyundai Rotem unveiled the HEMU-430X, a high-speed train with a speed of 430 km/h, to the public for the first time in South Korea and exhibited a low-floor tram that runs on both catenary and catenary cables. Woojin Industrial Systems unveiled a real Smart Monorail that uses pollution-free electric energy, and Samhyo E&C unveiled the PST system, a new track structure technology that will be applied as a demonstration project on the Honam high-speed railway. In addition, Korea National Railway, Busan Transportation Corporation, Korea Railroad Research Institute, Ansaldo, Thales, Hitachi and Vossloh of Germany participated.

=== 2015 ===
RailLog Korea 2015 was held from June 10 to 13, 2015, co-hosted by Busan City, Korail, and Korea Railroad Facility Authority, and co-organized by the Korea Railroad Rolling Stock Industry Association, Korea Railroad Association, BEXCO, and Messe Frankfurt Korea, with 161 companies from 21 countries participating.

Hyundai Rotem unveiled for the first time the electric trains to be delivered to Hyderabad, India and São Paulo, Brazil, and the Ui LRTwith a fully automatic unmanned system. Woojin Industrial Systems unveiled the bimodal tram, the INTELLIGENT APM, a rubber-wheeled light rail, and a mini tram. Sampyo E&C introduced a track switching device and a slab track model, and Korea Railroad Facility Corporation introduced a 4D rider and a motion recognition experience center. Busan Transportation Corporation unveiled its self-developed products such as a power analyzer and systems related to the Land, Infrastructure and Transport Technology Development Project. Austria participated in the form of a national pavilion, and Siemens of Germany and Heydt Turbo presented their latest technologies.

=== 2017 ===
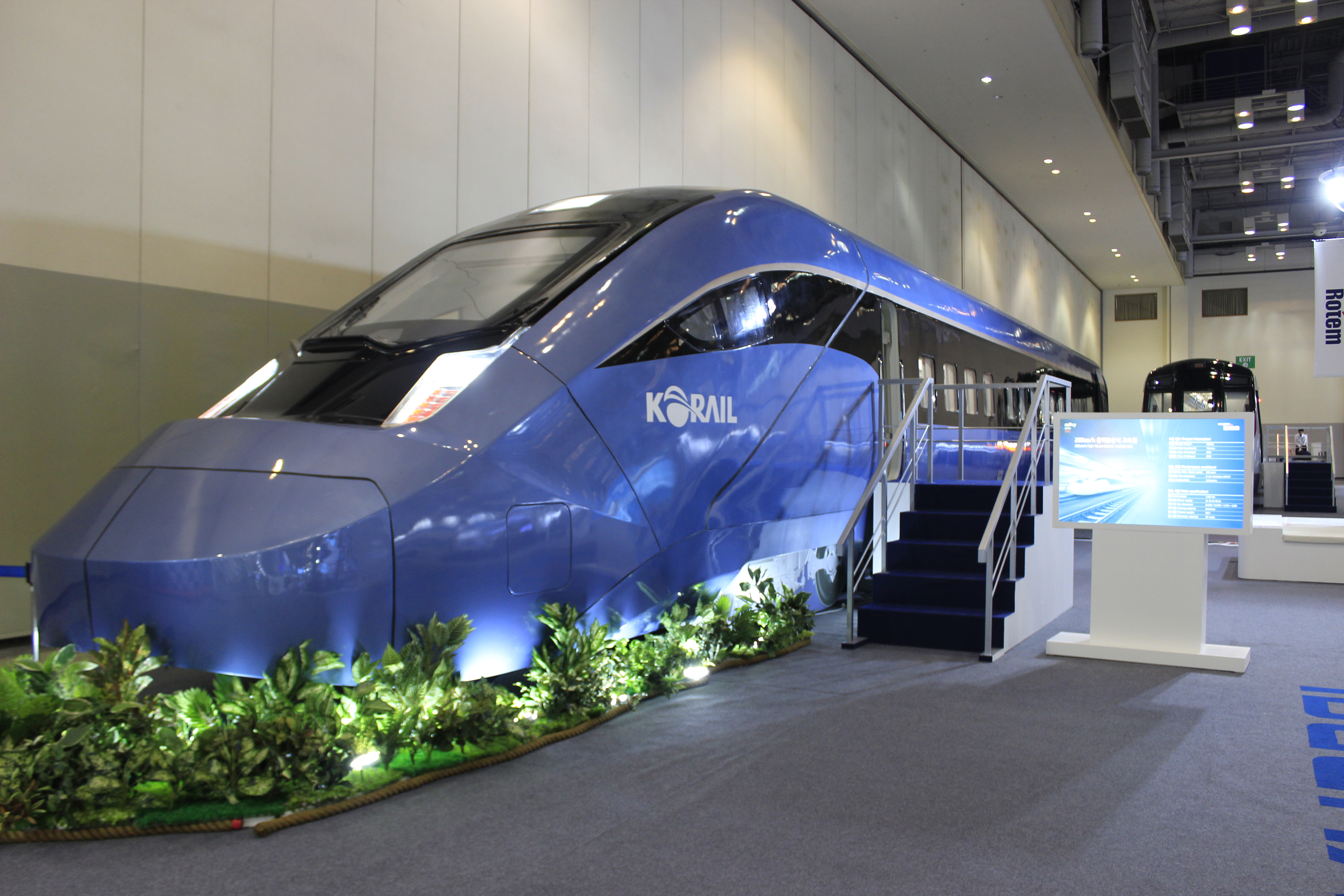
EMU-250

RailLog Korea 2017 was held from June 14 to 17, 2017, with 830 booths from 163 companies from 22 countries. The number of visitors was estimated at around 18,000.

Hyundai Rotem unveiled the Hong Kong's Sha Tin to Central Link EMU and the distributed power high-speed train EMU-250. Woojin Industrial Systems unveiled the eco-friendly transportation system mini tram and electric bus. Among foreign companies, Austria participated in a large-scale national pavilion, and Alstom of France, TÜV Korea, Ricardo Rail, and Knorr Brake Korea participated.

=== 2019 ===
RailLog Korea 2019 was held from June 12 to 15, 2019, with approximately 939 booths from 165 companies from 23 countries. It was estimated that approximately 20,000 people visited, including business professionals and general visitors.

Hyundai Rotem unveiled a steep curve test vehicle under development as a hydrogen electric tram and a low-floor electric multiple unit to be delivered to the Tunisian Railways. Daewonsys displayed an electric multiple unit of the Seoul Subway Line 7, a propulsion control unit, an auxiliary power unit, a train control unit, and an air conditioning unit. Woojin Industrial Systems showcased railway parts such as electrical components that supply power for heating, cooling, and cabin lighting for railway vehicles, and motor block propulsion control units.

Austria participated in the form of a national pavilion centered around six major companies.

=== 2021 ===
Raillog Korea 2021 was held from June 16 to 19, 2021, with 95 companies and approximately 810 booths.

Korail, SR Corporation, Busan Transportation Corporation, Hyundai Rotem, Woojin Industrial Systems, LG Display participated. Hyundai Rotem presented Hyundai Motor Company's hydrogen electric tram concept vehicle that combines hydrogen fuel cells and electric batteries as a hybrid method and a hydrogen charging facility package, and exhibited the 320 km/h distributed power high-speed train EMU-320. Woojin Industrial Systems exhibited a newly developed urban railway vehicle for the extension of the Byeollae Line. LG Display unveiled a transparent OLED panel for railways.

=== 2023 ===
RailLog Korea 2023 was held from June 14 to 17, 2023, with 970 booths from 120 companies in 14 countries. It was the largest in terms of the number of booths. On the Korean side, railway organizations such as the National Railroad Corporation, Korail, SR, and Busan Transportation Corporation, as well as railway vehicle manufacturers such as Hyundai Rotem, Woojin Industrial Systems, and Dawonsys, participated in large numbers.

== See also ==
- InnoTrans
- Rail transport in South Korea
