= InnoTrans =

Trade fair held in Berlin, Germany

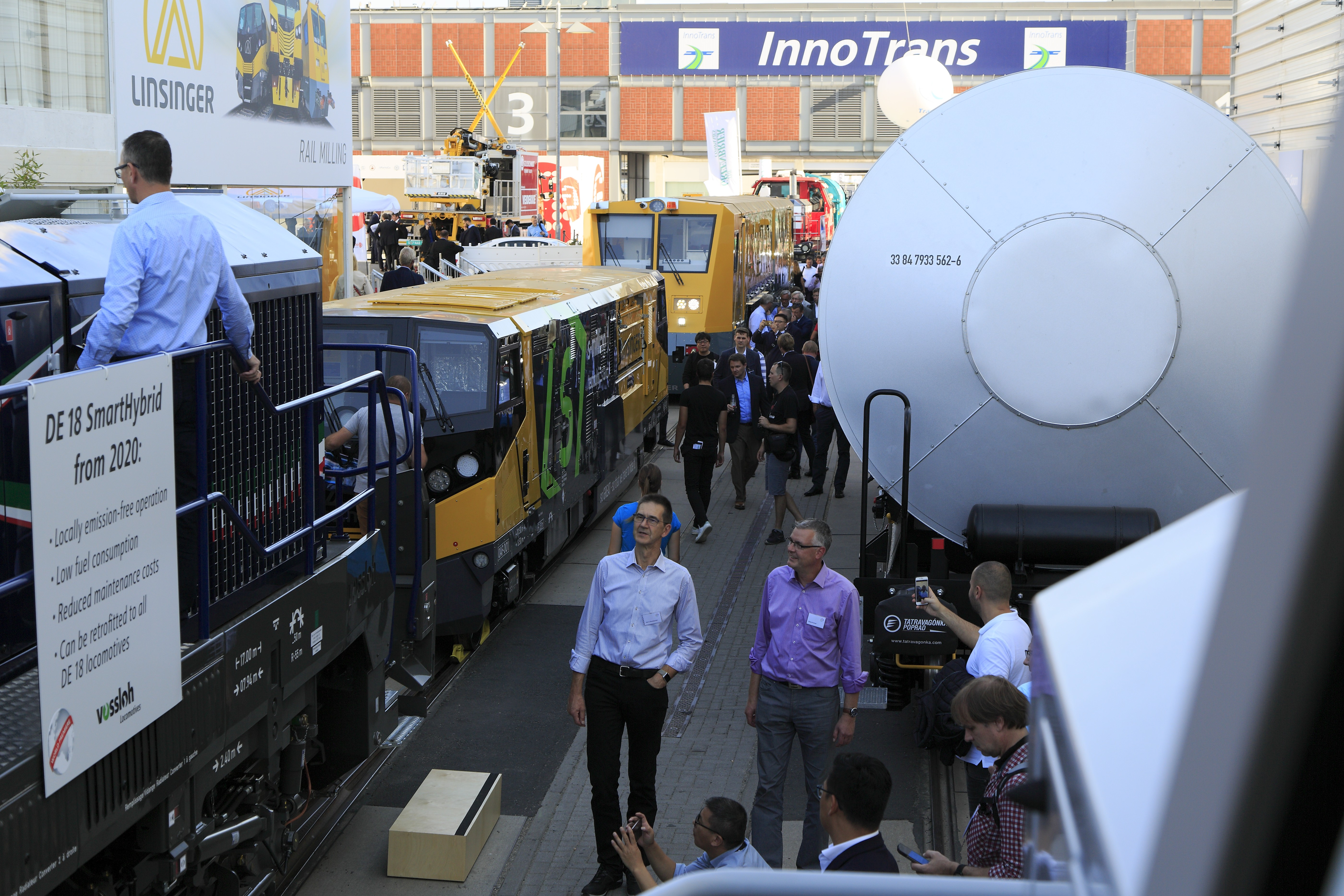
- InnoTrans 2018
- Status: Active
- Genre: Rail transport
- Venue: Messe Berlin
- Location: Berlin
- Country: Germany
- Inaugurated: 1996
- Attendance: 106,612
- Organizer: Messe Berlin
- Website: www.innotrans.de

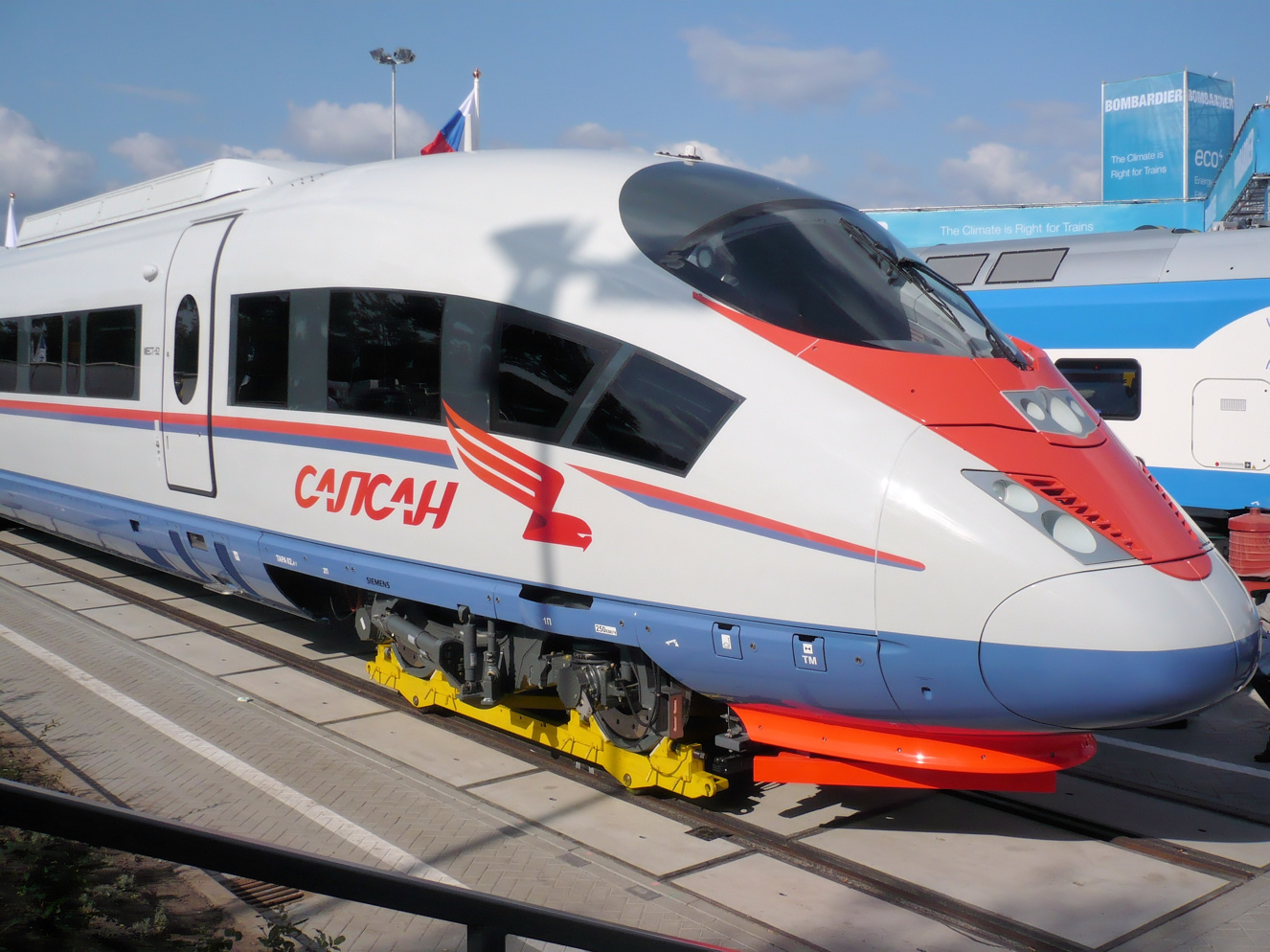
Sapsan for Russia at InnoTrans 2008

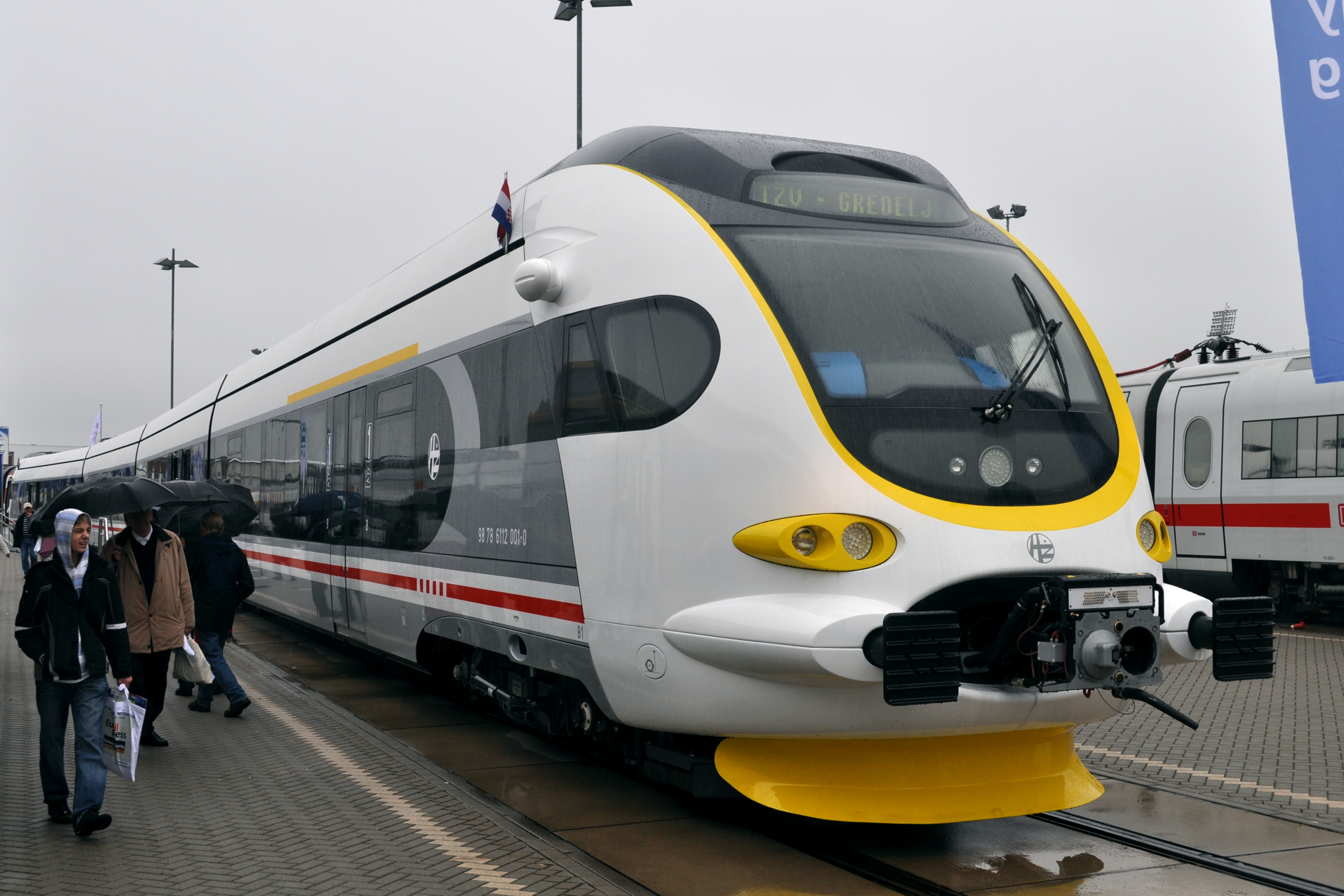
Croatian Railways new EMU at InnoTrans 2010

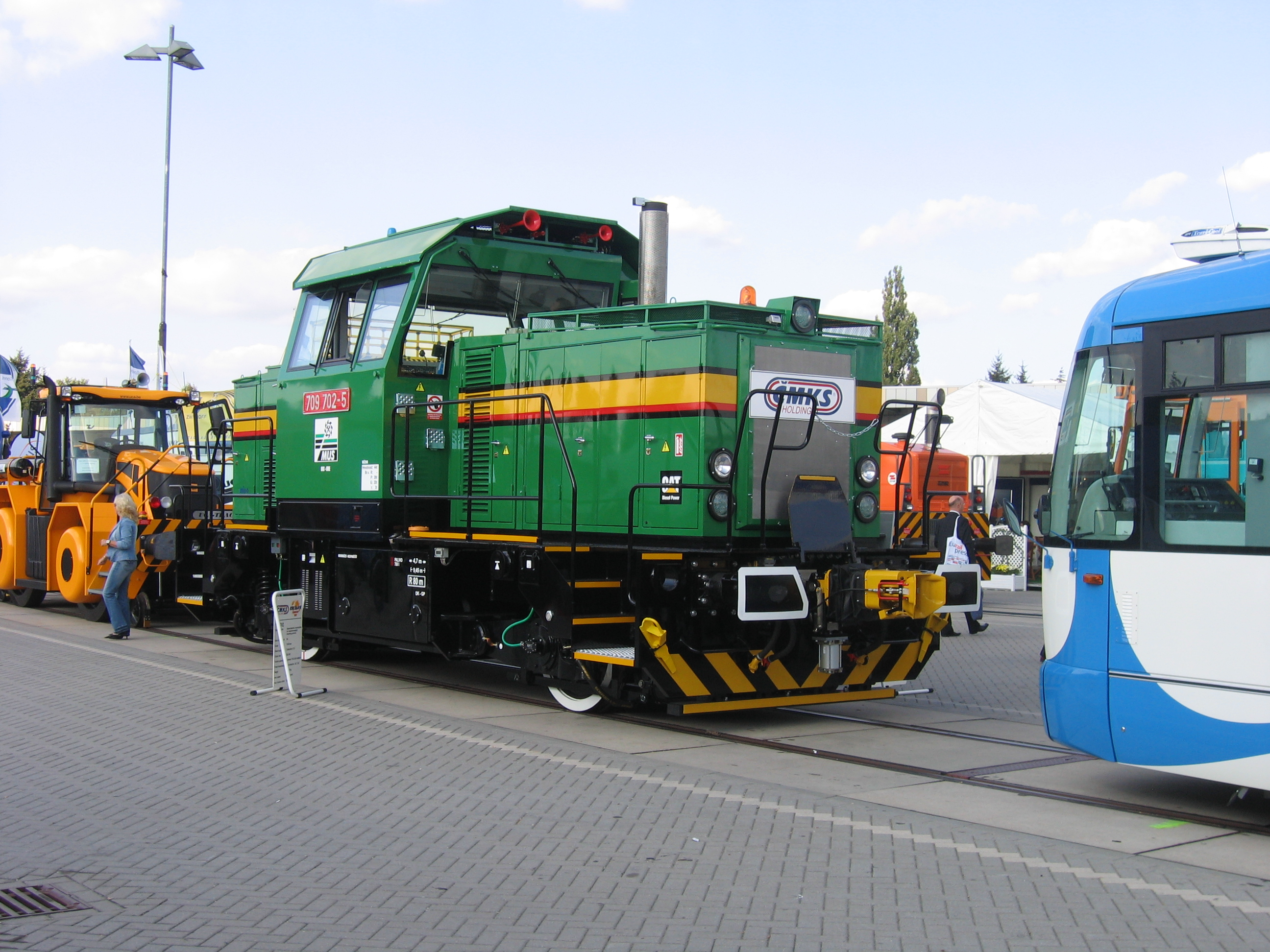
CMKS 709.702 shunter at InnoTrans 2006

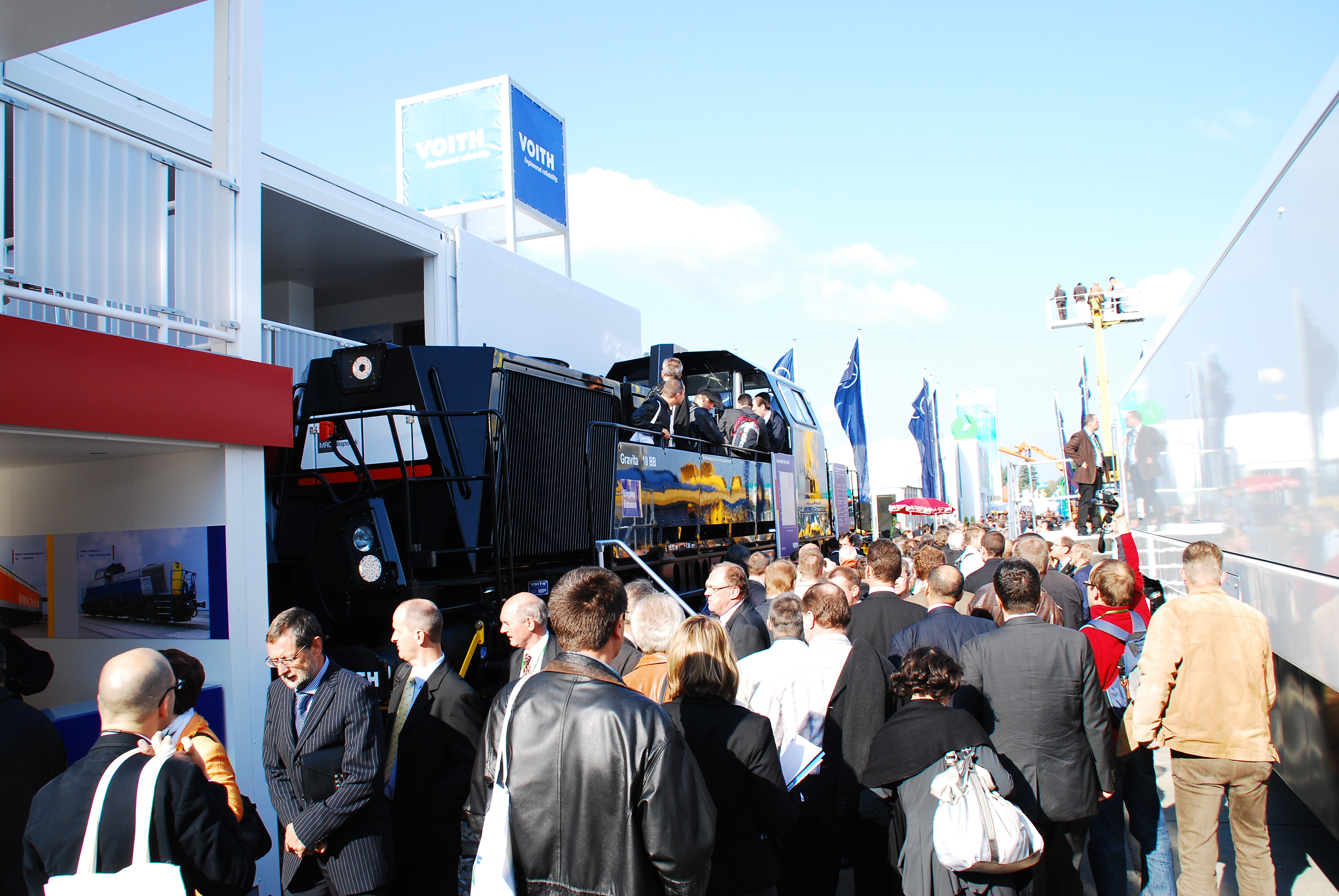
Voith Gravita at Innotrans 2008

InnoTrans is the world's largest trade fair focused on the rail transport industry. It is held every two years at the Messe Berlin exhibition centre, which has outdoor standard gauge railway sidings which can be used to exhibit railway vehicles. Until 2016, there were public days at the weekend to view rolling stock on display, which were accompanied by an entertainment programme. These public days have not been held since InnoTrans 2018, officially due to a lack of space and insufficient logistical options.

== History ==
InnoTrans has grown steadily in area and exhibitor numbers since it moved to Berlin in 1996. For the 2010 fair, organiser Messe Berlin Ltd announced an increase to 2,000 exhibitors from 44 countries, which covered the whole area of the exhibition centre for the first time.

A spin-off supplementary exhibition "Public Transport Interiors" aimed at the mass transit sector was planned, but the first event announced for 2011 was postponed until a later time. InnoTrans 2012 was instead the first to include a separate "Public Transport and Interiors Hall Forum", with a series of multimedia presentations on new design options in the industry.

== InnoTrans trade fairs ==
2028

- 19 to 22 September 2028 in Berlin

2026

- 22 to 25 September 2026 in Berlin
- 3190 exhibitors from 59 countries
- 175 591 visitors from 128 countries

2024

- 24 to 27 September 2024 in Berlin
- 2,946 exhibitors from 59 countries
- 170,000 visitors from 128 countries

2022

- 20 to 23 September 2022 in Berlin

2020

- Was to be 22 to 25 September 2020 in Berlin, but moved to 27 to 30 April 2021 because of the COVID-19 pandemic, and was moved again to 2022.

2018

- 18 to 21 September 2018 in Berlin
- 3062 exhibitors from 61 countries

2016

- 20 to 23 September 2016 in Berlin (weekend public opening 24/25).
- Conference Corner where exhibitors, associations and transport companies can hold lectures and present papers.
- 2955 exhibitors from 60 countries.
- The summer-garden yard is opened to display electric buses and to allow a round driving course.
- For the first time all of the 41 exhibition halls of the fair ground are used, which encompasses about 200,000 square meters (2,200,000 sq ft), including 3,500 meters (11,500 ft) of standard gauge track

2014

- 23 to 26 September 2014 in Berlin (weekend public opening 27/28)
- More than 2700 exhibitors from 51 countries. An InnoTrans Daily newspaper will be produced by Railway Gazette International
- Messe Berlin has constructed a further exhibition hall called the CityCube Berlin.
- in addition to the general ten standard gauge tracks a Special Gauge Display allows to show broad gauge and narrow gauge vehicles.
- List of rolling stock on show.

2012

- 18 to 21 September 2012 in Berlin (weekend public opening 22/23)
- InnoTrans still grows – 2450 exhibitors from 47 countries were expected at InnoTrans 2012, which had five main segments: Railway Technology, Railway Infrastructure, Tunnel Construction, Interiors and Public Transport. More than 110,000 trade visitors are expected. An InnoTrans Daily newspaper will be produced by Railway Gazette International.
- List of rolling stock on show.

2010

- 21 to 24 September 2010 in Berlin (weekend public opening 25/26)
- 2,242 exhibitors from 45 countries
- 106,612 trade visitors from 110 countries
- 81,000 square meters of exhibitions booths and 3,500 metres of railway track
- 121 vehicles on show

2008

- 23 to 28 September in Berlin
- 1,912 exhibitors from 41 countries
- 80,000 trade visitors from 100 countries
- 150,000 square meters of exhibition area and 3,500 metres of railway track
- 91 vehicles on show. Contracts signed worth about €2 billion

2006

- 19 to 22 September in Berlin
- 1,606 exhibitors from 41 countries (50% from outside Germany)
- 64,422 trade visitors from 90 countries (40% of the visitors)
- 25,000 private visitors on the weekend public opening
- 50,591 square meters of exhibition area (1,868 metres of railway tracks)

2004

- 21 to 24 September in Berlin
- 1,369 exhibitors from 35 countries
- 44,968 trade visitors (14 300 from outside Germany; 21 000 private visitors on the weekend public opening)
- 40,468 square meters of exhibition area (1,868 metres of railway tracks)

2002

- 24 to 27 September in Berlin
- 1,045 exhibitors from 30 countries
- 35,686 trade visitors (9,385 from outside Germany 30,000 private visitors on the weekend public opening)
- 29,469 square meters of exhibition area

2000

- 12 to 15 September in Berlin
- 826 exhibitors (268 from outside Germany)
- 23,909 trade visitors (4.662 from outside Germany)
- 22,179 square meters of exhibition area

1998

- 28 to 30 October in Berlin
- 403 exhibitors (100 from outside Germany)
- 13,164 trade visitors (3,278 from outside Germany)
- 10,534 square meters of exhibition area

1996

- 15 to 20 October in Berlin
- 172 exhibitors (21 from outside Germany)
- 6,376 trade visitors (829 from outside Germany)
- 4,524 square meters of exhibition area

== See also ==
- Trako
- Korea Railways & Logistics Fair
- Rail transport in Germany

== Website ==
- Media related to InnoTrans at Wikimedia Commons
- InnoTrans website
