= Hyundai Elec City =

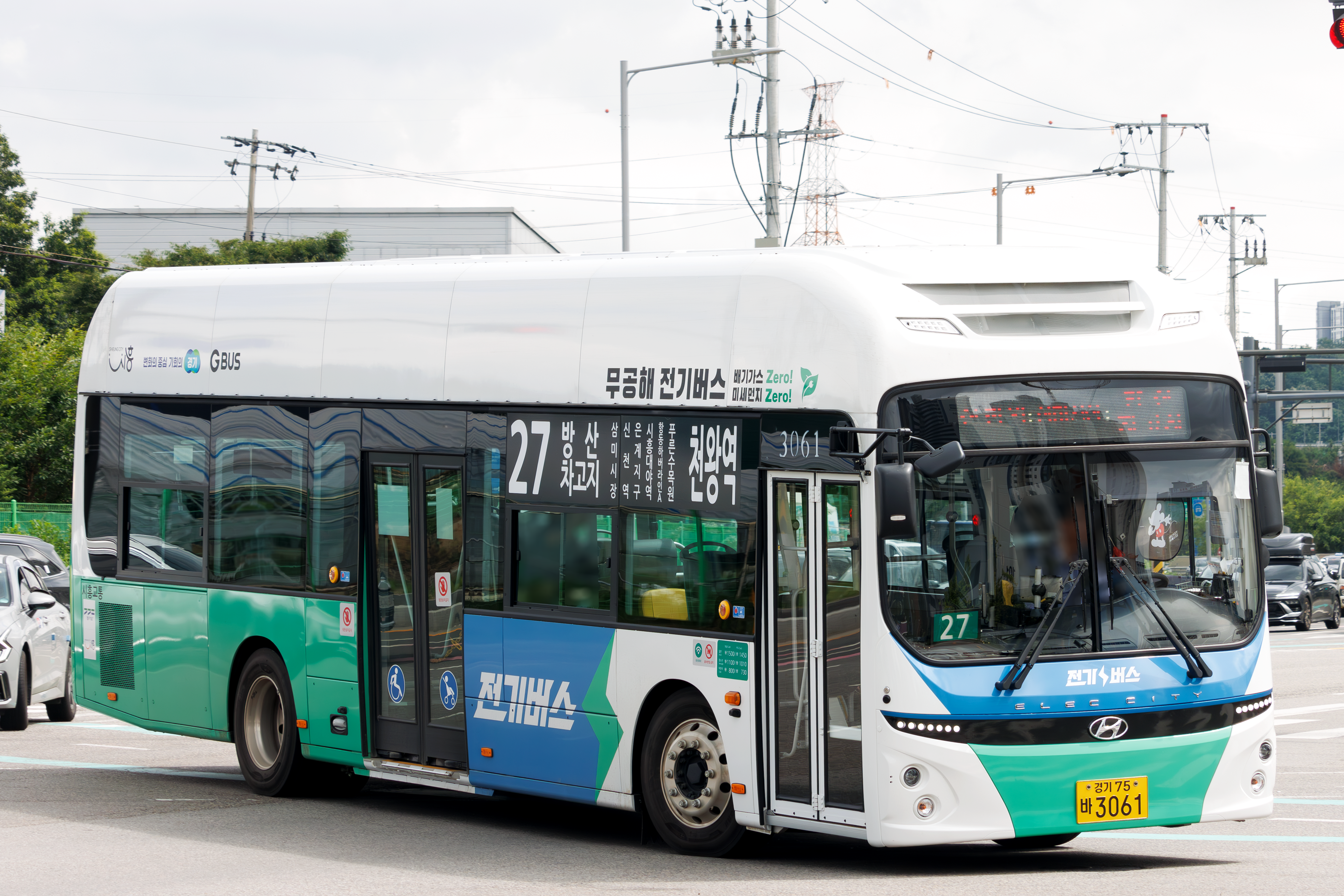

Overview
- Manufacturer: Hyundai Motor Company
- Production: 2017–present

Body and chassis
- Class: Transit bus
- Body style: Single-decker bus
- Floor type: Low-entry; Step entrance
- Chassis: Low-floor & High-floor

Powertrain
- Engine: Electric
- Battery: 256 kWh Lithium polymer battery
- Range: 290 km (180.2 mi)

Dimensions
- Length: 10,955 mm (431.3 in)
- Width: 2,490 mm (98.0 in)
- Height: 3,995 mm (157.3 in)

Chronology
- Predecessor: Hyundai Aero City; Hyundai Green City

The Hyundai Elec City (Korean: 현대 일렉시티) is Hyundai Motor Company's first low-floor electric bus and heavy-duty single-decker bus. Its models include the fuel cell bus as a city bus as either an Elec City FCEV or smaller Elec City Town.

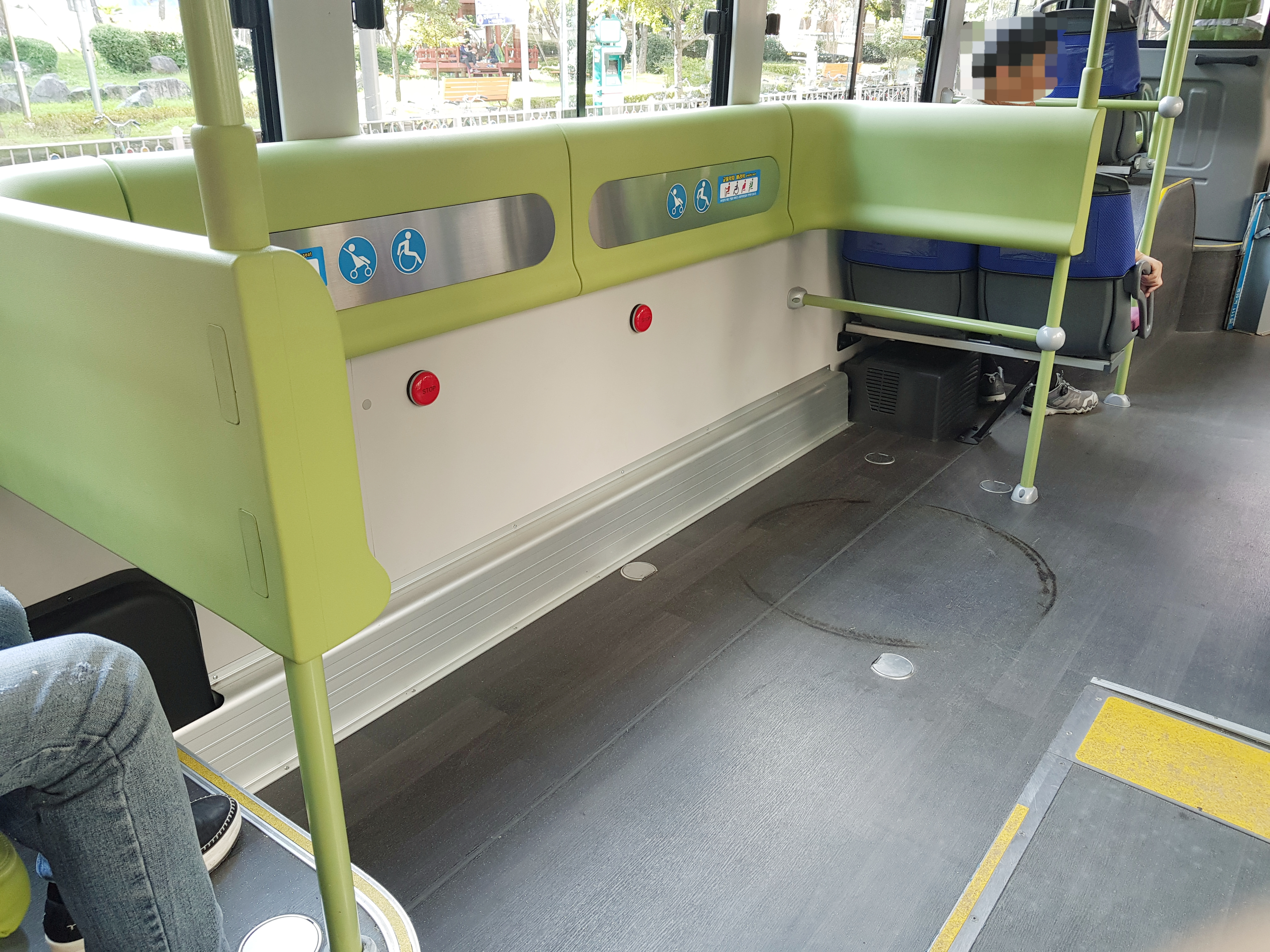
Wheelchair seat

In May 2017, after eight years of development, Hyundai Elec City was first unveiled at Hyundai Motor Company's commercial vehicle motor show, the Hyundai Truck & Bus Mega Fair. It was officially launched on November 24, 2017. The bus offers 27 seats. Equipped with a 256 kWh high-capacity lithium polymer battery, it can travel up to 290 km on a charge. The battery is mounted on the ceiling and the motor is mounted on the rear wheel, creating a bus with a larger than normal interior. It is equipped with technologies such as automatic temperature control, optimizing battery performance in extreme cold or heat, and an ultrasonic sensor that prevents the front and rear doors from closing when a person approaches them.

== Elec City FCEV (2019–) ==
The Elec City FCEV is an urban fuel cell bus. Hyundai began research and development of hydrogen vehicles in 1998 and launched the Elec City FCEV in 2019. It was equipped with a fuel cell system with a maximum output of 180 kW, a hydrogen tank capacity of 875 L, and a battery that could store 78.4 kWh. The first CNG version could travel 550 km on a single charge. The overall length was 11 m, the width was 2.49 m, and the height was 3.4 m.

It was exported to Saudi Arabia in 2020 and to Austria in 2022.

In September 2024, cumulative sales exceeded 1,000 units.

== Elec City Town (2022–) ==
The Elec City Town is a mid-sized model measuring 9 m in length. It is equipped with a 145 kWh battery, and can travel over 220 km on a charge. The maximum capacity is 41 passengers. It is equipped with functions such as two-stage regenerative braking, kneeling, and body height adjustment.

In July 2024, after passing local driving tests, it was exported to Japan.

== Gallery ==
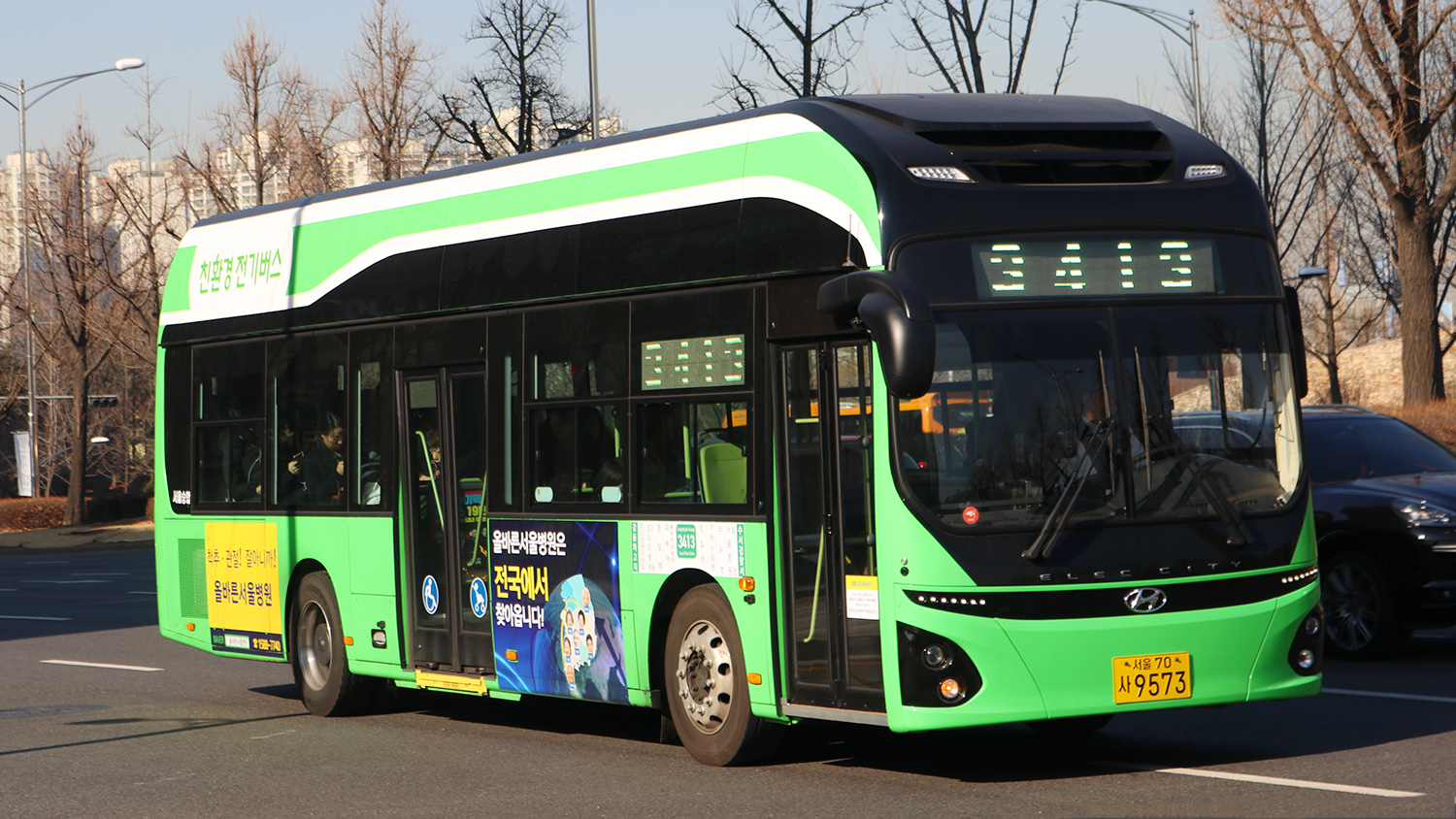
Bus 3413 Elec City in Seoul, South Korea

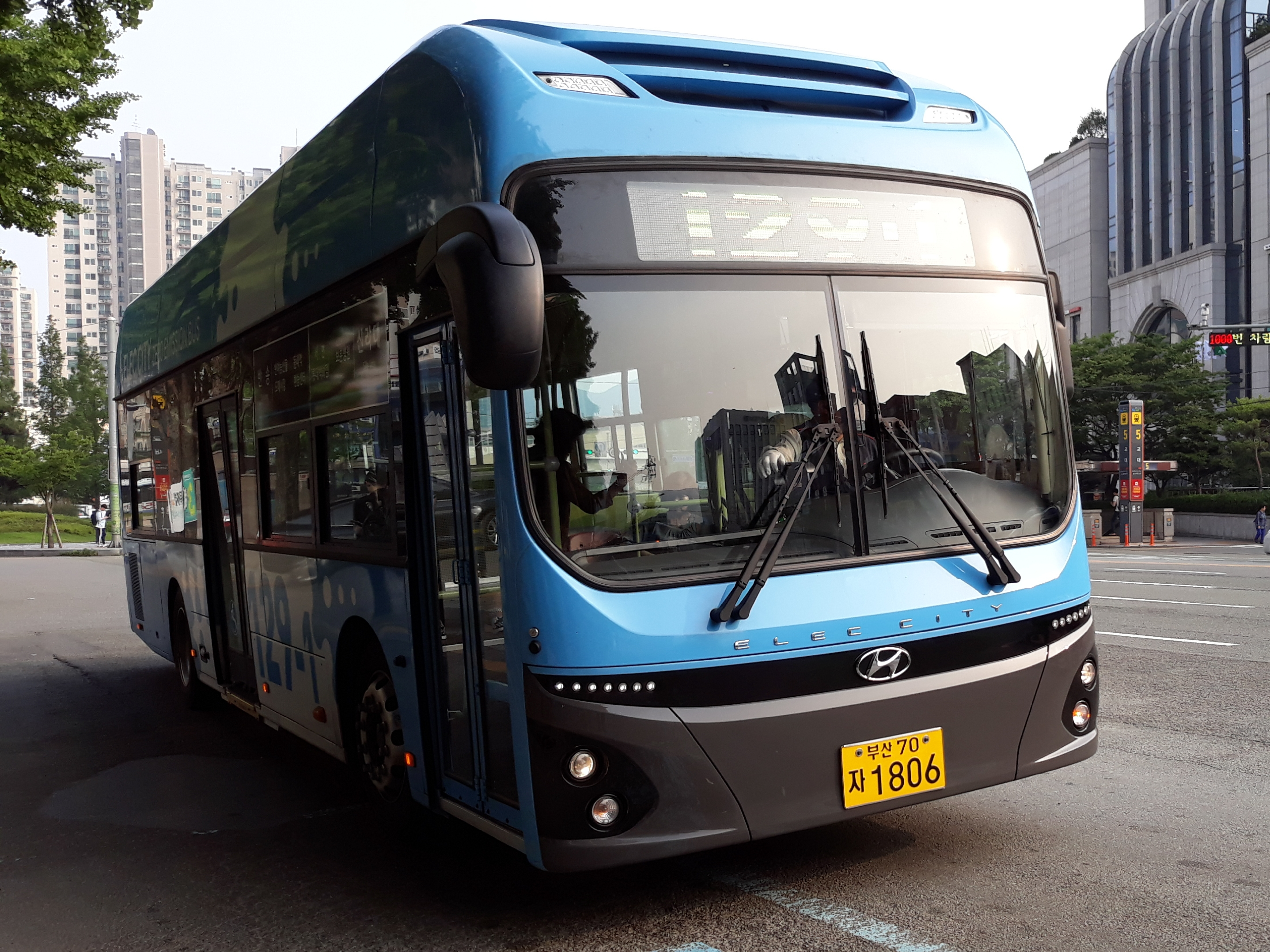
Elec City Plug-in model in Busan, South Korea

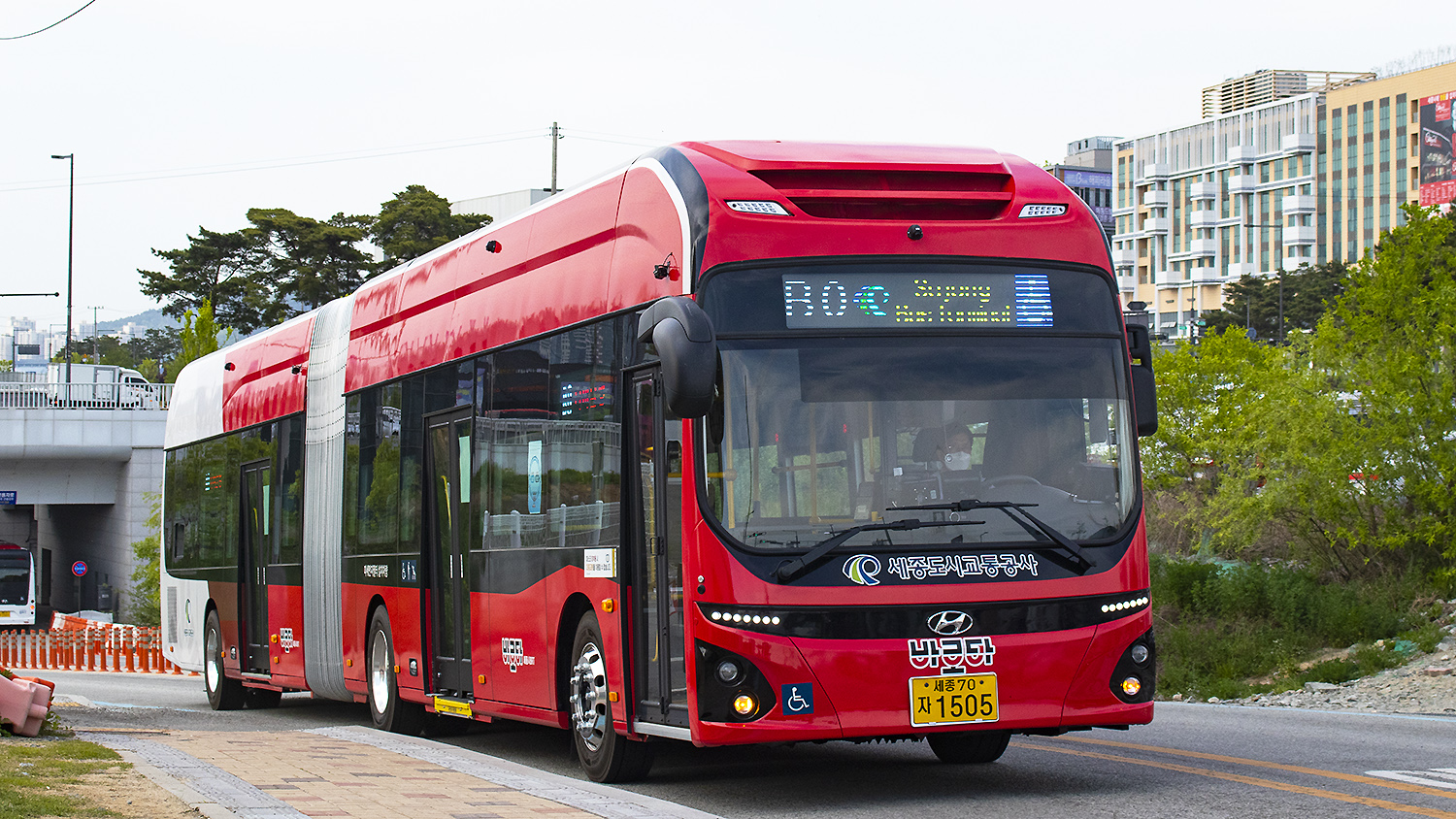
Elec City articulated bus in Sejong City, South Korea

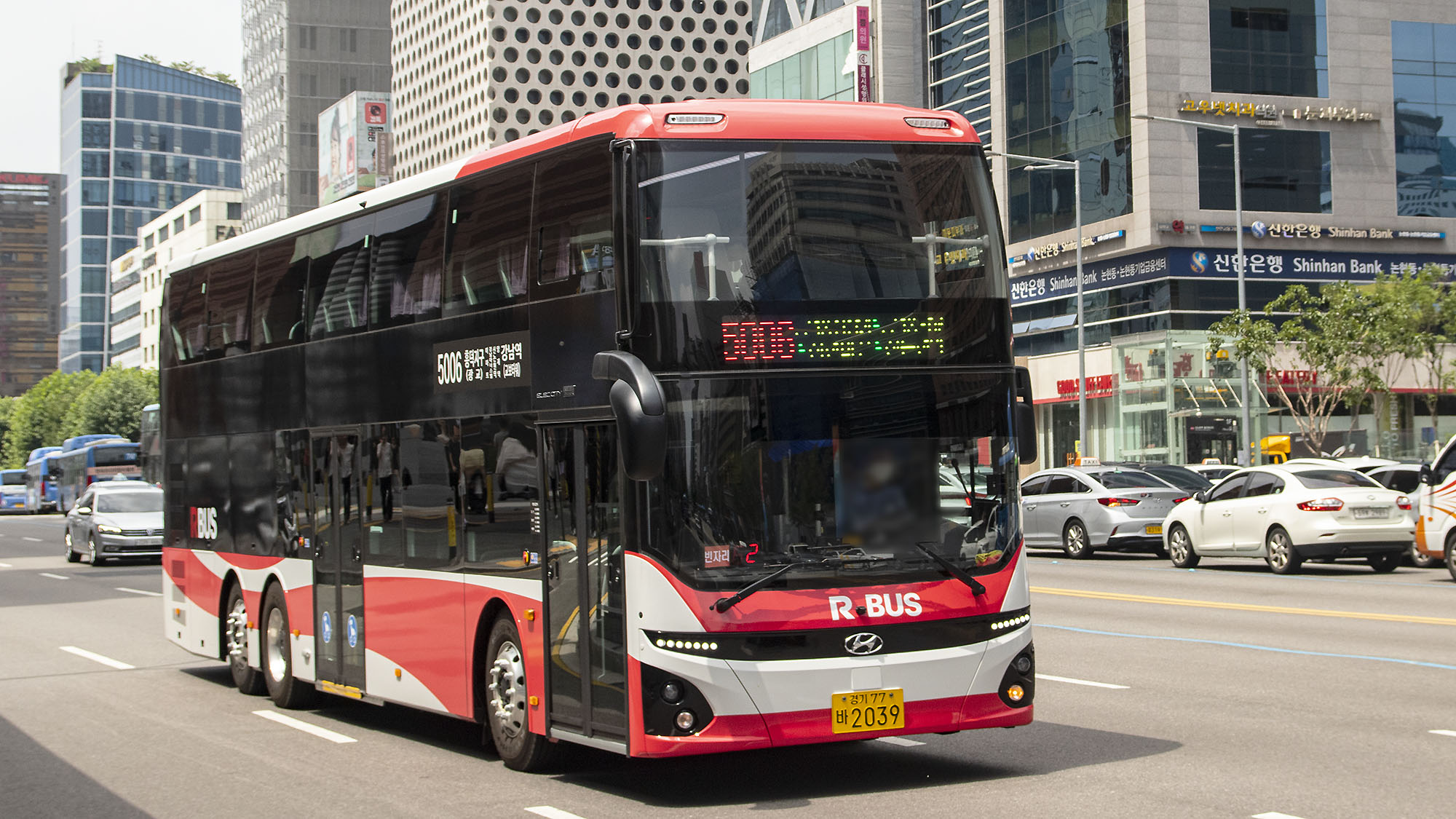
Elec City double-decker bus

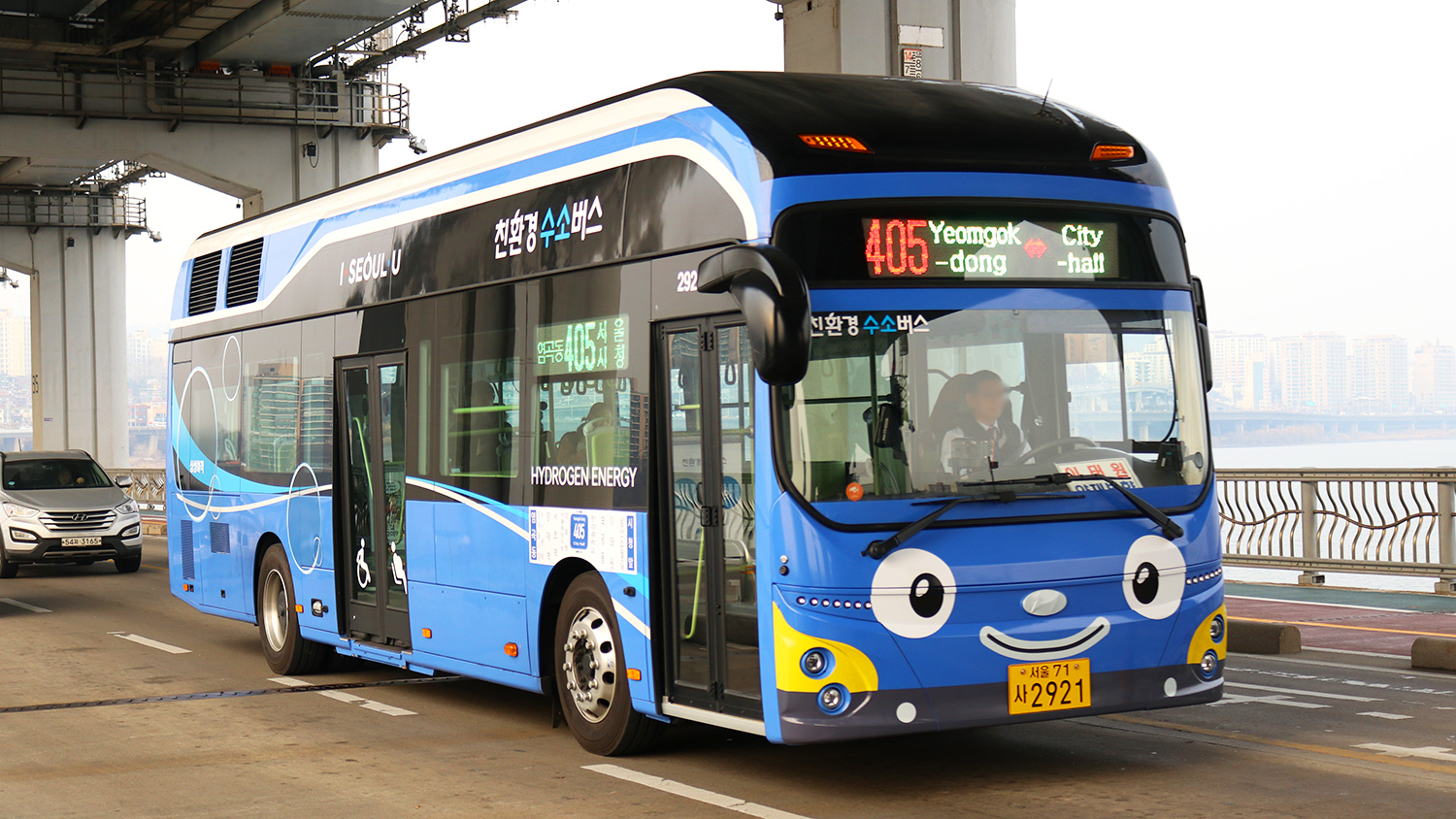
Elec City FCEV in Seoul

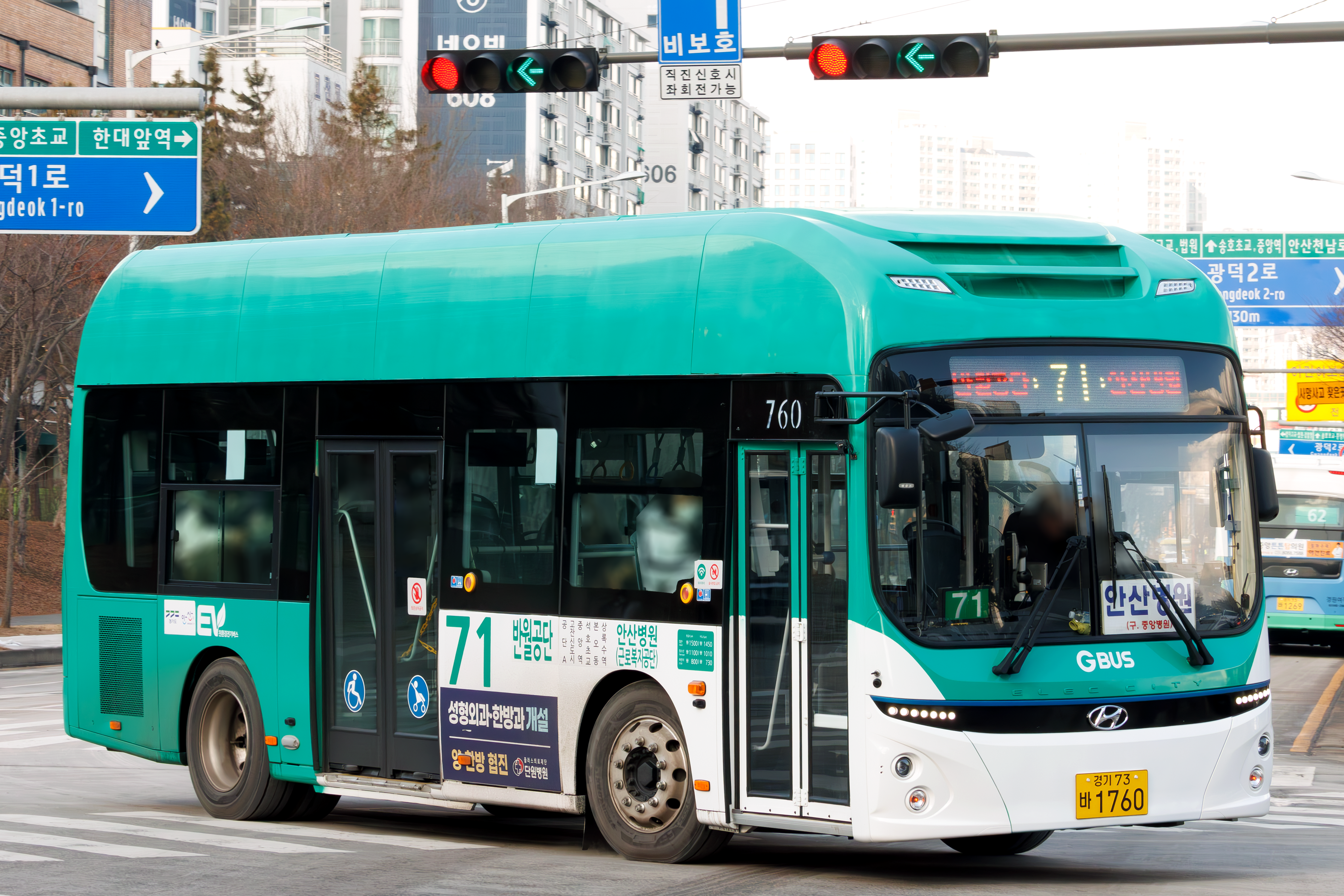
Elec City Town in Ansan, Gyeonggi Province

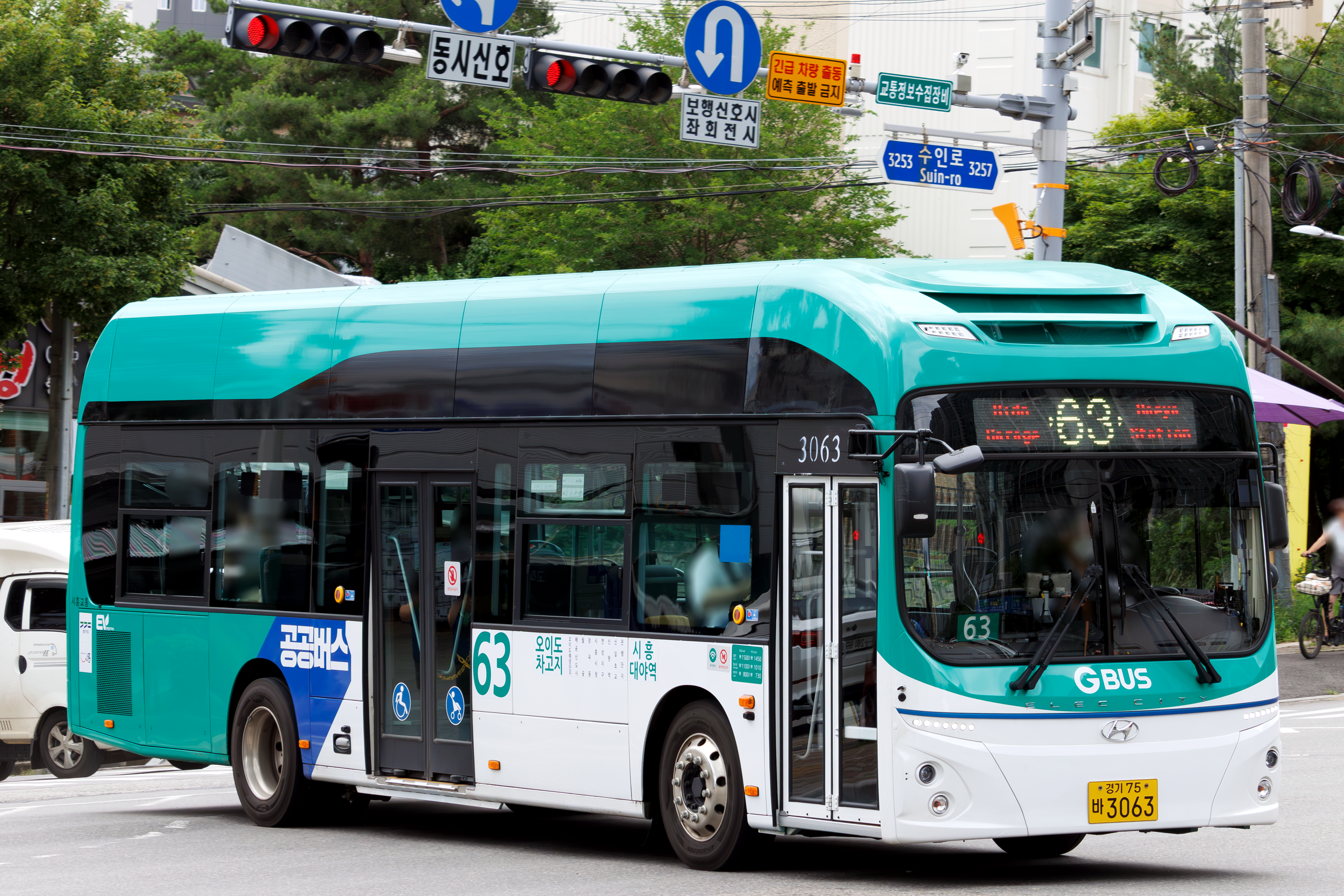
Elec City in Siheung

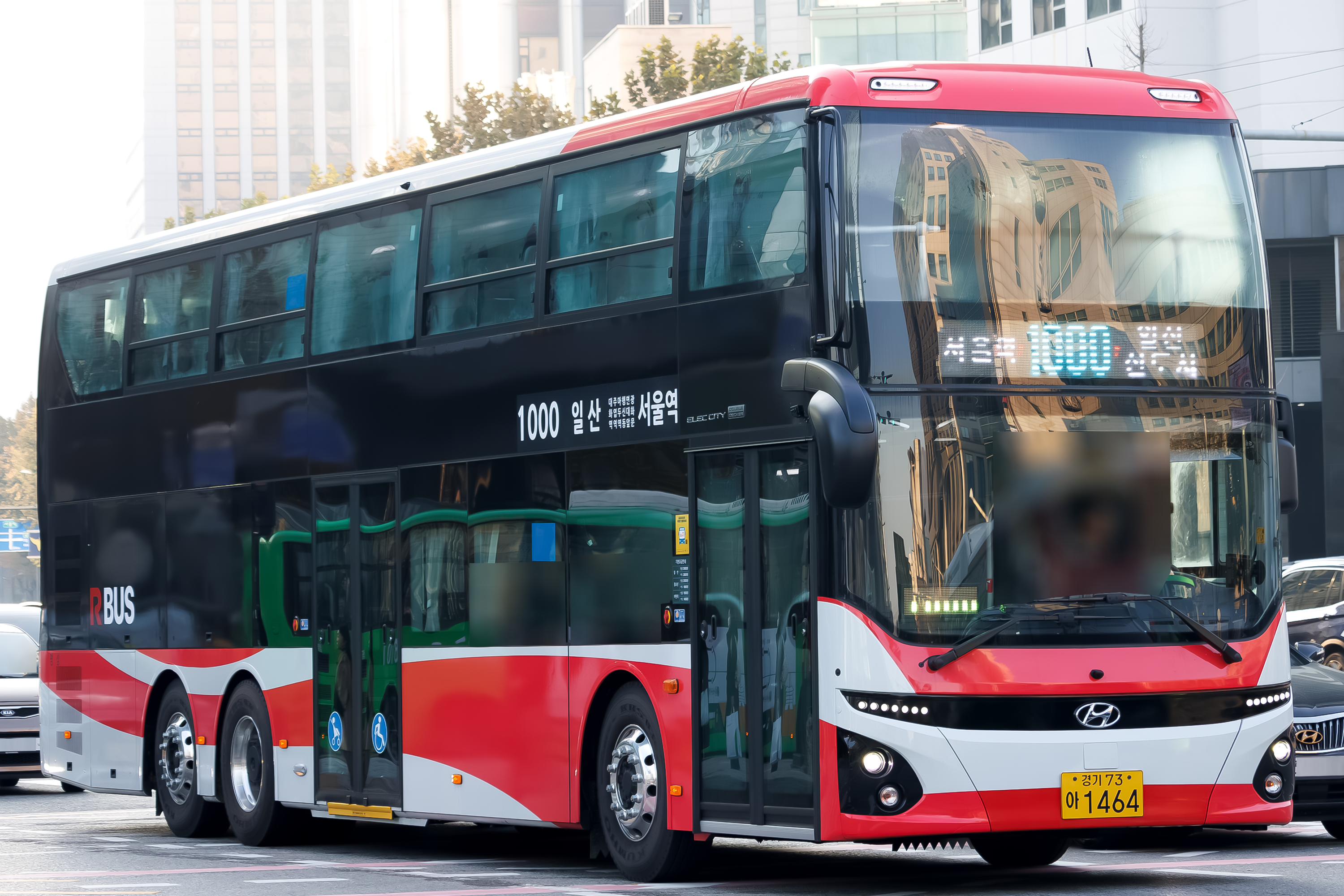
Elec City Double Decker in Goyang

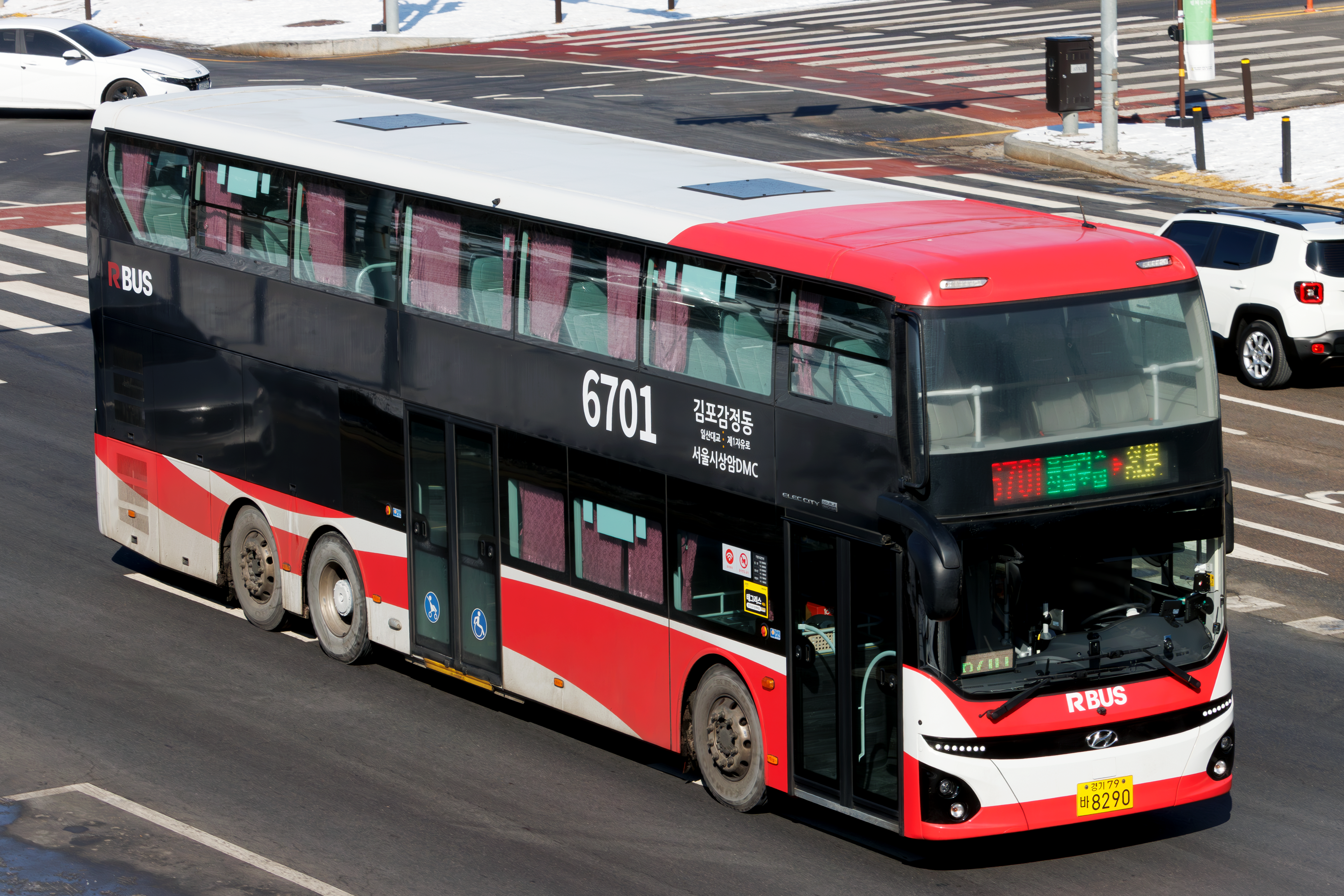
Elec City Double Decker in Gimpo

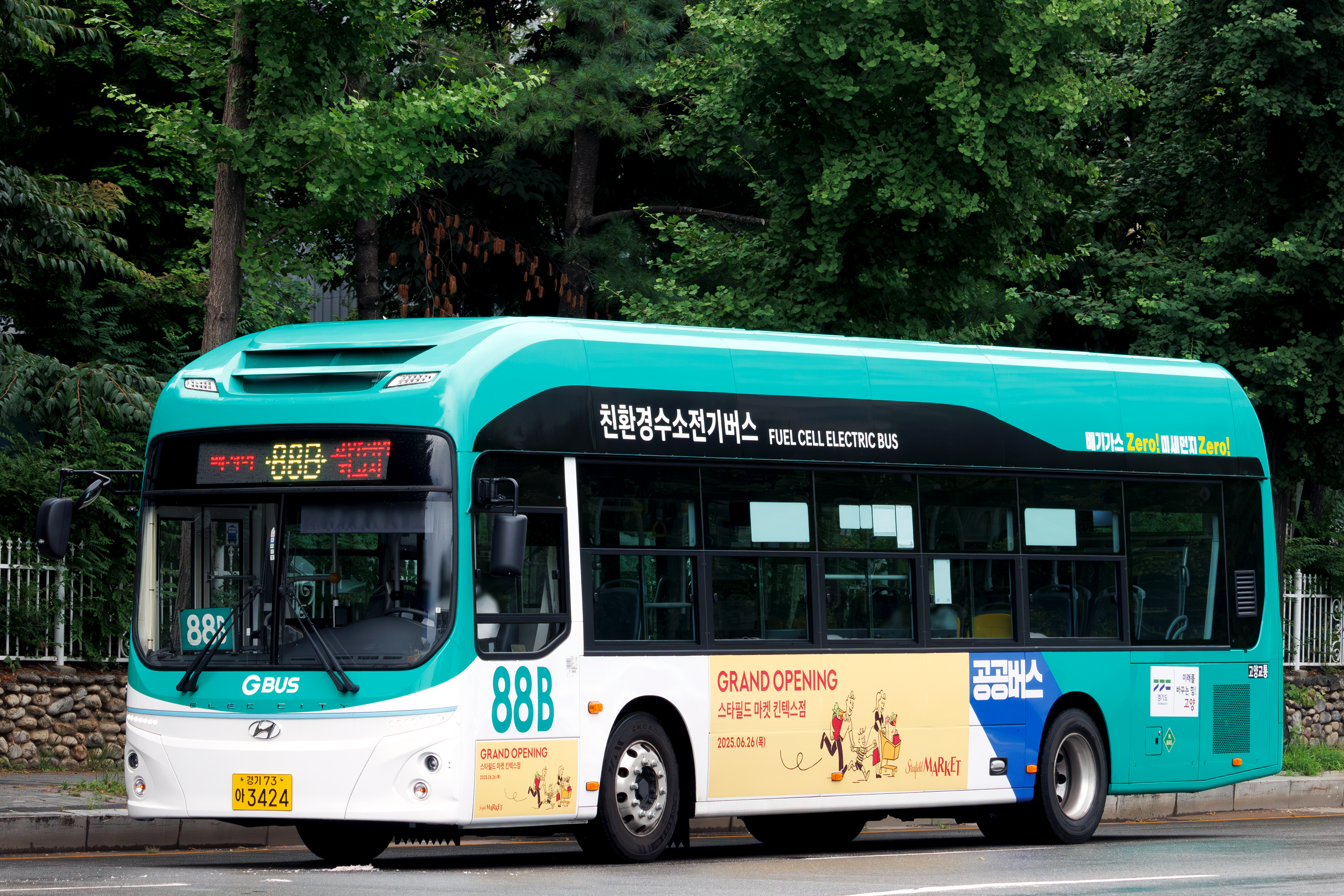
Elec City FCEV in Goyang

== See also ==
- KGM Commercial C
- Woojin Apollo
