= Hankuk Fiber Primus =

2009–2014 bus brand by Hankuk Fiber

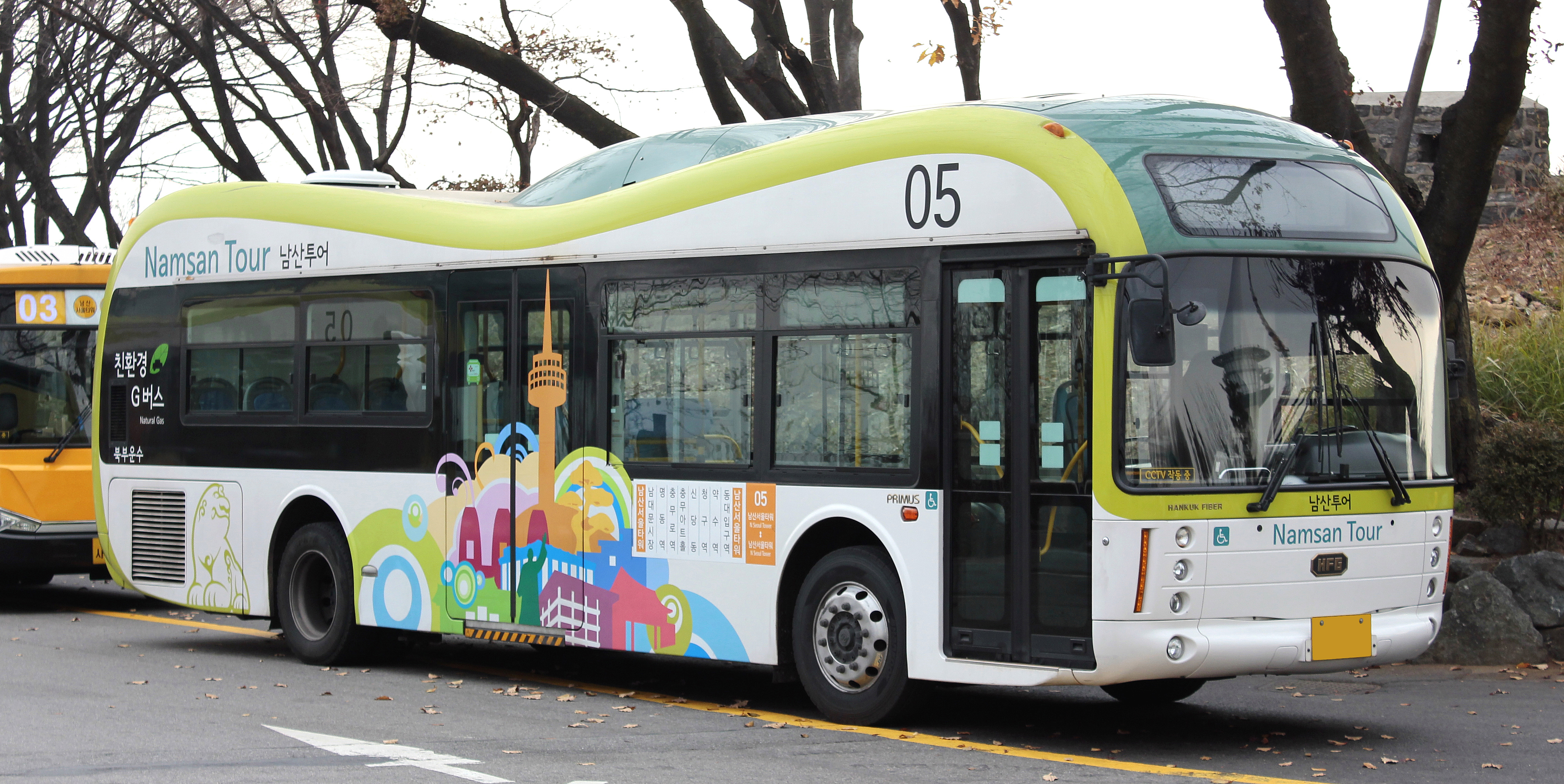
- Seoul Bus Route 5, 2014

Overview
- Manufacturer: Hankuk Fiber
- Production: 2009–2014

Body and chassis
- Class: Transit bus
- Body style: Single-decker bus
- Chassis: Low-floor

Powertrain
- Engine: LNG; Electric

Dimensions
- Length: 11,055 mm (435.2 in)
- Width: 2,485 mm (97.8 in)
- Height: 3,995 mm (157.3 in)

Hankuk Fiber Primus (Korean: 한국화이바 프리머스) is a low-floor bus manufactured by Hankuk Fiber, South Korean commercial vehicle manufacturer. It was discontinued in 2014 when its successor model, Fibird, was released. Because of its shape, the bus is also nicknamed the peanut bus (땅콩버스).

== History ==
In 2005, the Ministry of Construction and Transportation initiated the development project for a South Korean-type low-floor bus. A total of 10.5 billion won was invested by Hankuk Fiber, the manufacturer of the vehicle, and the development period was three years until 2008. The development goals were to establish an eco-friendly bus operation system through the localization of ultra-low-floor axles, reduction of fuel costs through body weight reduction, and distribution of unique models for each city, and also to standardize city buses through expanded distribution.

In 2009, the mass production system for standard low-floor buses was established and Primus was introduced for the first time.

The electric motor and rapid charging facility were developed by Hyundai Heavy Industries, and the body was manufactured by Hankuk Fiber. The body uses reinforced plastic to reduce the weight of the bus to about 10.5 t, which is 80% of the weight of existing city buses. The capacity is 50 people.
