= KGM Commercial C =

South Korean bus lineup

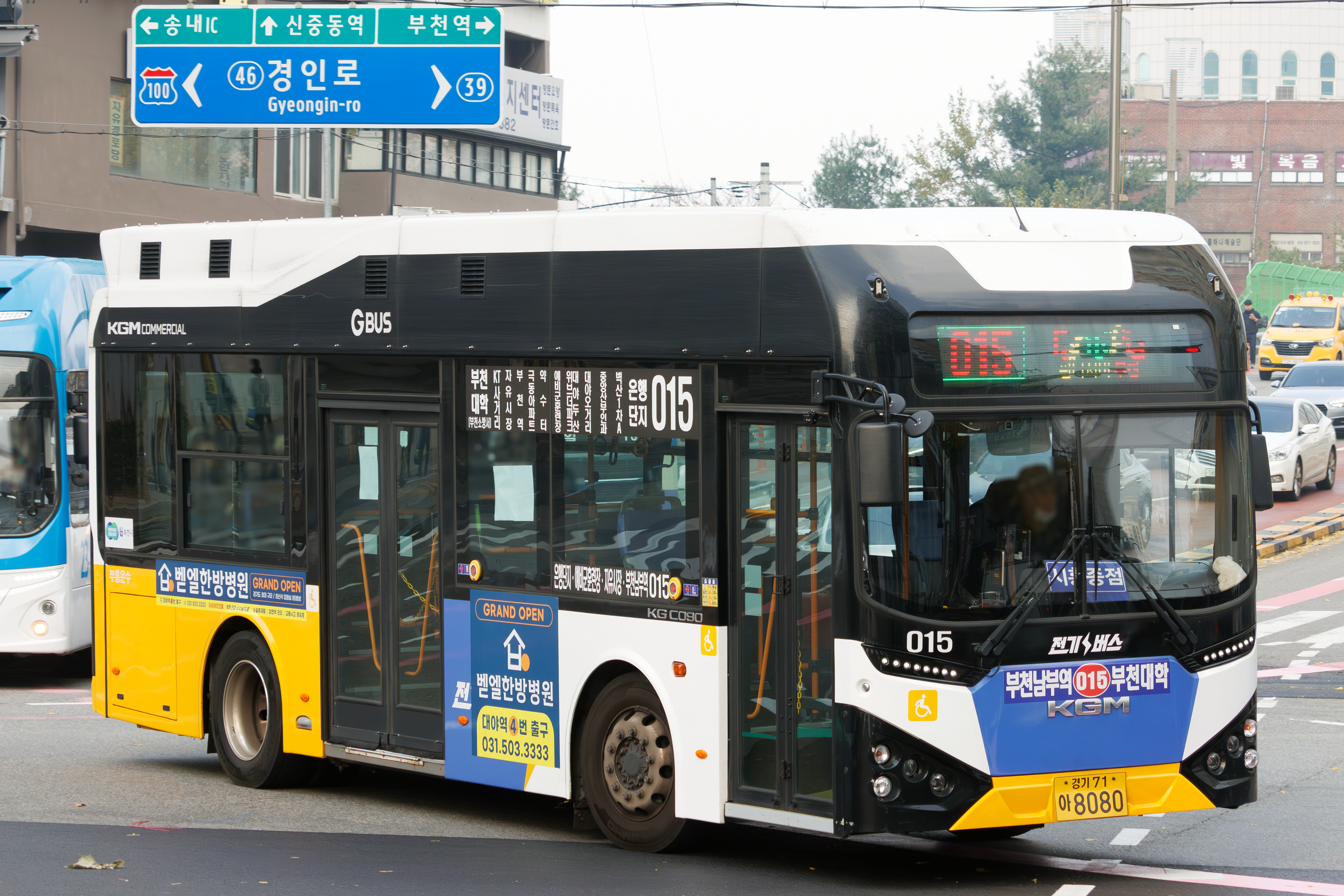

Overview
- Manufacturer: KGM Commercial
- Production: 2024–present
- Assembly: Gunsan, Jeonbuk State

Body and chassis
- Class: Transit bus
- Body style: Single-decker bus

Powertrain
- Engine: Electric

KGM Commercial C is the bus lineup of South Korean bus manufacturer KGM Commercial.

== Model ==
=== C090 ===
The C090 is a 9-meter electric bus produced at the Gunsan plant. The model was released in 2024.

=== Planned model ===
- C120
- C110
- C070
- C110H

== See also ==
- Hyundai Elec City
- Woojin Apollo
