= Woojin Apollo =

South Korean electric bus series

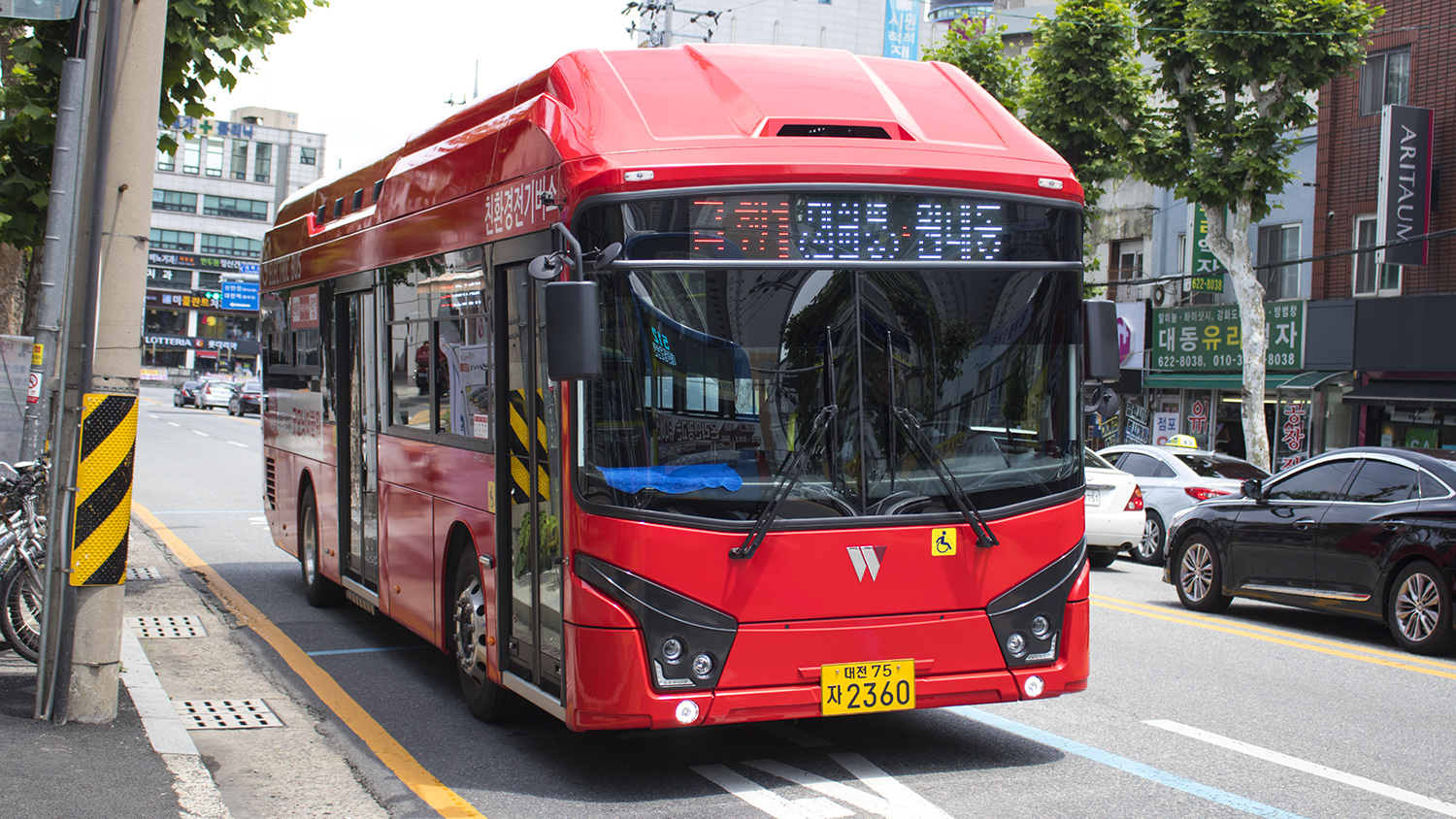
- Apollo 1100

Overview
- Manufacturer: Woojin Industrial Systems
- Production: 2017–present

Body and chassis
- Class: Transit bus
- Body style: Single-decker bus
- Chassis: Low-floor

Powertrain
- Engine: Electric

Woojin Apollo (Korean: 우진산전 아폴로) is a South Korean electric bus and rolling stock manufacturer Woojin Industrial Systems' plug-in electric low-floor bus series. It was first unveiled at the 2017 Daegu International Future Auto Expo held at EXCO in Daegu, and is produced at the Ochang Plant in Cheongju, North Chungcheong Province.

== Model ==
=== Apollo 700 ===
The Apollo 700 was unveiled at the 2024 Daegu Future Innovation Technology Expo. It is a 7 m medium-sized bus. It has full air suspension on the front and rear.

=== Apollo 900 ===
The Apollo 900 is a 9 m medium-sized bus. It is equipped with a high-efficiency 172.4 kWh battery and a real-time battery monitoring function to prevent accidents such as fire. Two wheelchair fixing spaces were applied to improve the mobility of the mobility-disadvantaged and an electronic garage height adjustment device was applied to facilitate boarding and disembarking.

=== Apollo 1100 ===
The Apollo 1100 is an 11 m model. It is equipped with a function that automatically adjusts the vehicle's driving conditions according to changes in road conditions or driving conditions and an automobile safety control system that actively controls the brakes during sharp turns, rapid acceleration, and sudden braking depending on the vehicle's driving conditions.

=== Apollo 1200 ===
The Apollo 1200 is a 12 m LHD-class coach model released in October 2023.

== Gallery ==
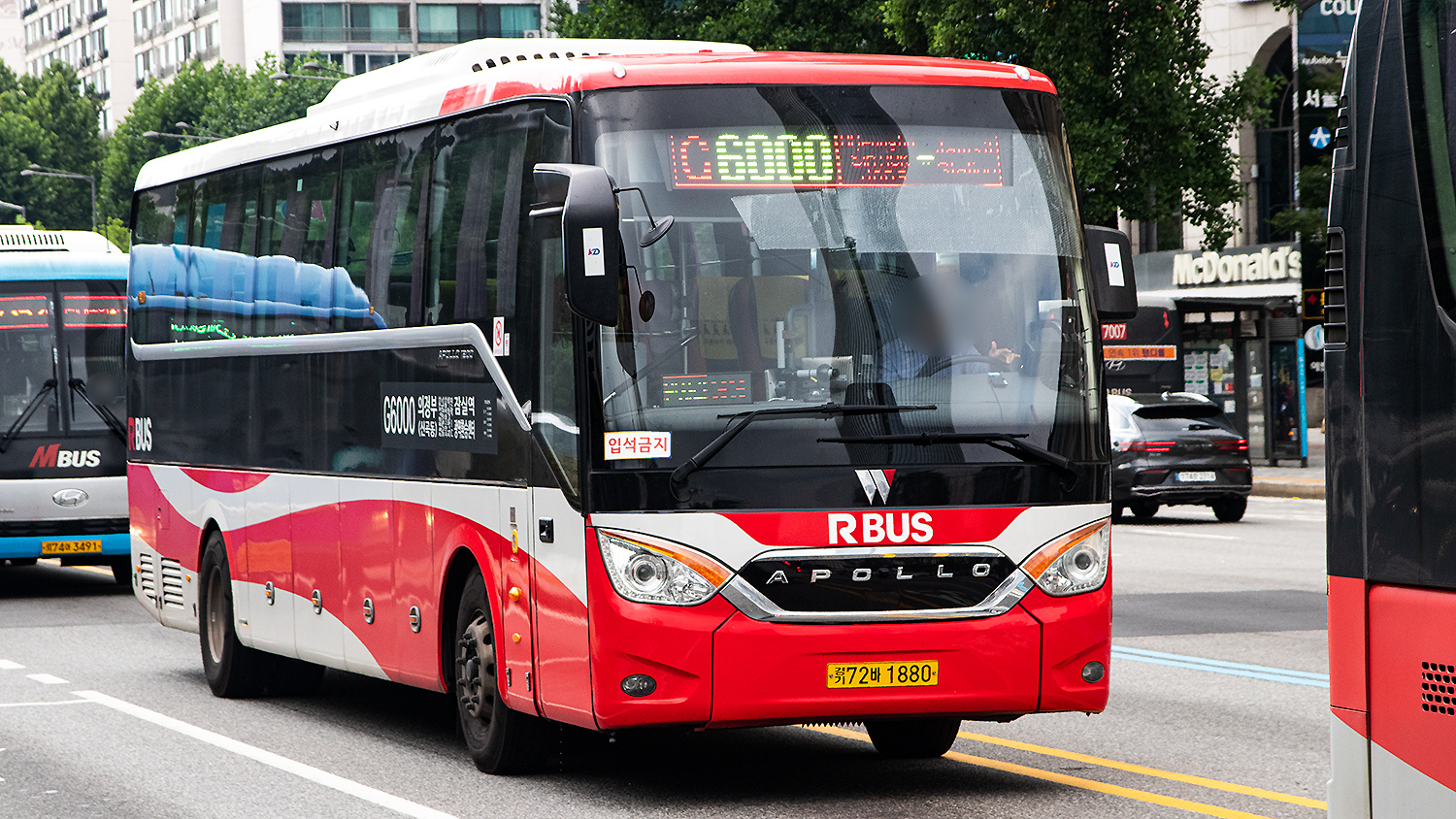
Apolio 1200

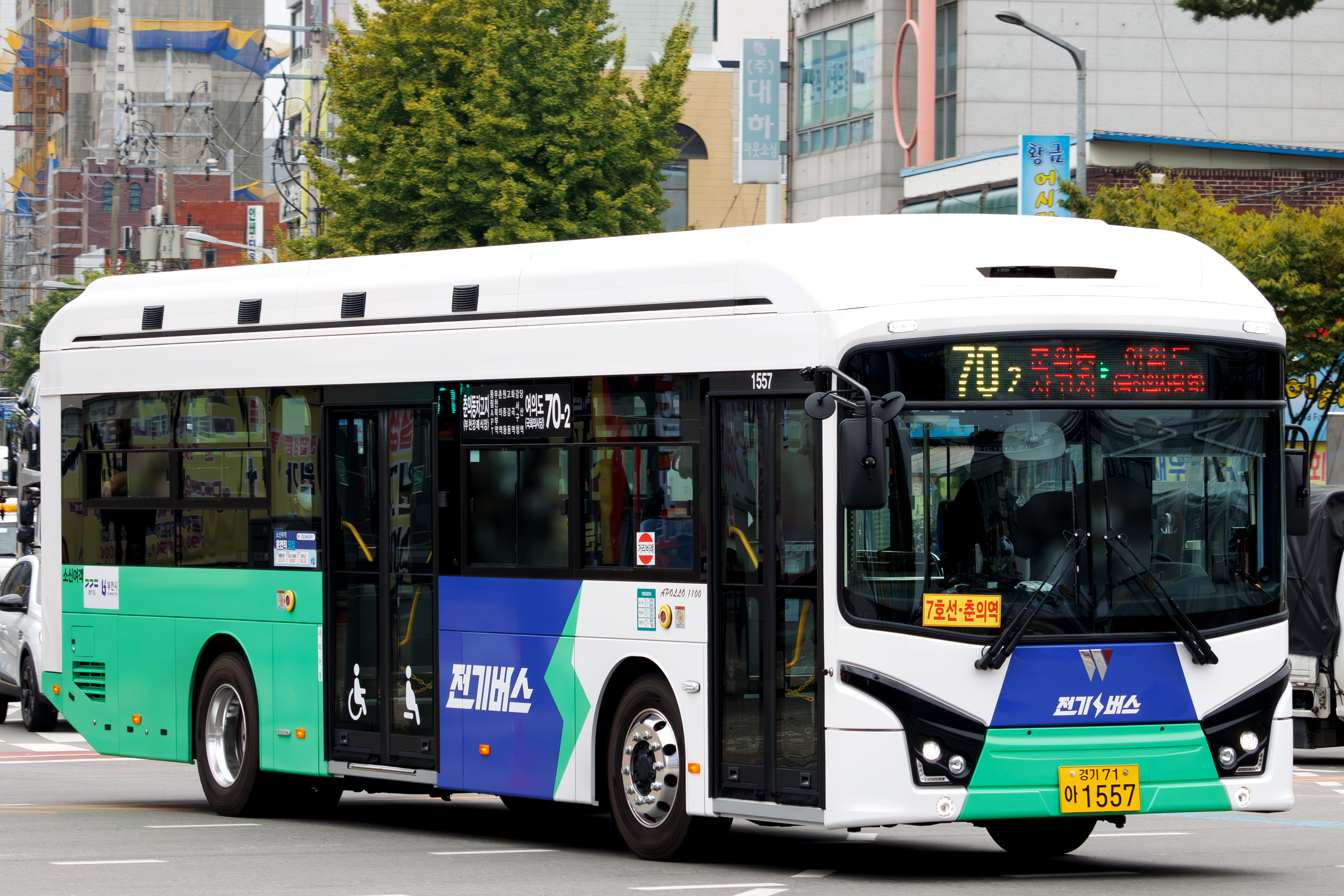
Apolio 1100 V2

== See also ==
- Hyundai Elec City
- KGM Commercial C
- Zyle Daewoo Bus
- Automotive industry in South Korea
