= Busan Exhibition and Convention Center =

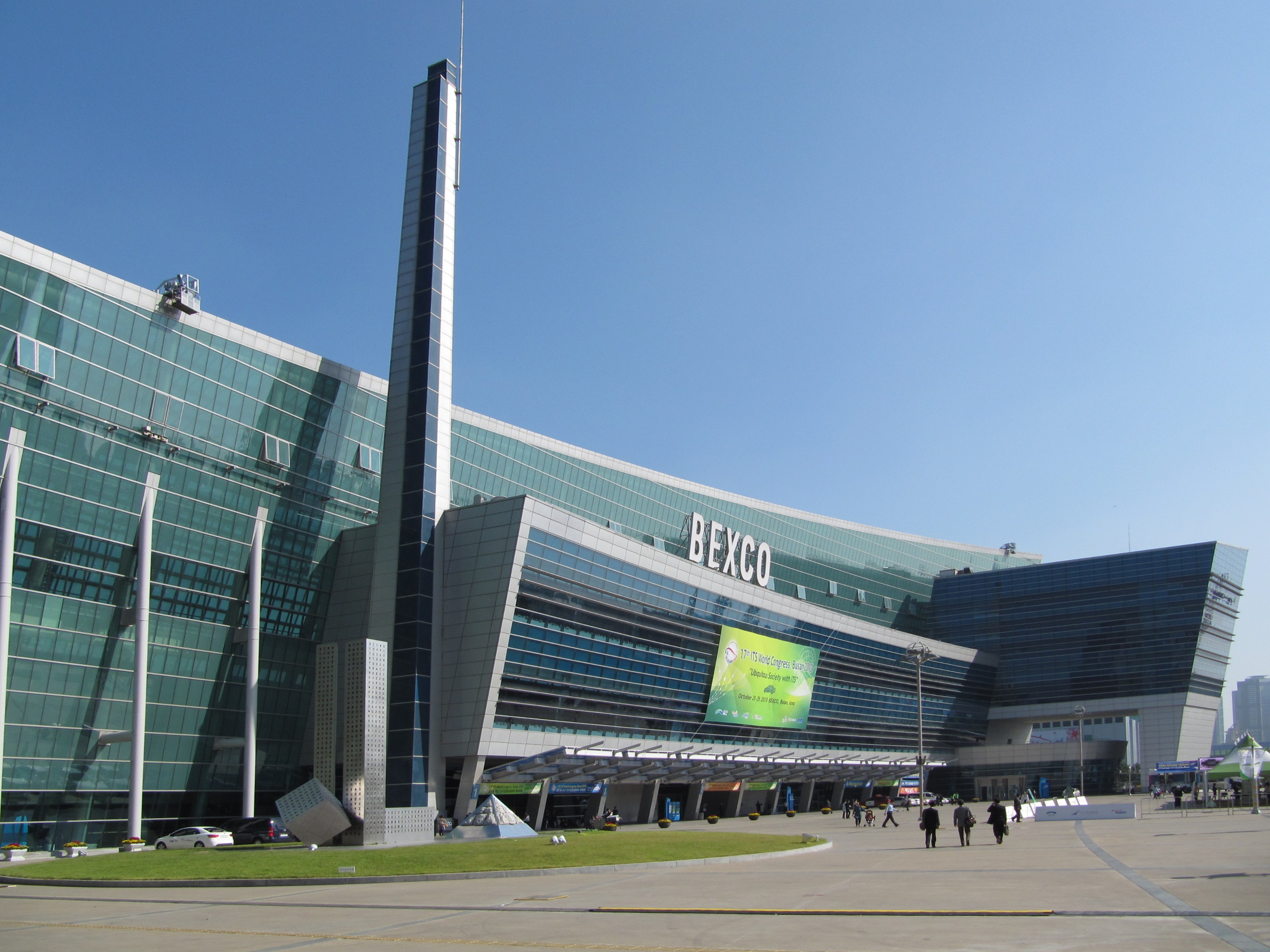
- The building
- Interactive map of the Busan Exhibition and Convention Center area

General information
- Location: 55 APEC-ro, Haeundae-gu, Busan, South Korea
- Coordinates: 35°10′09″N 129°08′11″E
- Opened: 2001

Website
- www.bexco.co.kr/eng/Main.do

Korean name
- Hangul: 부산전시컨벤션센터
- RR: Busan jeonsi keonbensyeon senteo
- MR: Pusan chŏnsi k'ŏnbensyŏn sent'ŏ

Short name
- Hangul: 벡스코
- RR: Bekseuko
- MR: Peksŭk'o

Busan Exhibition and Convention Center (Korean: 부산전시컨벤션센터), commonly known as BEXCO (벡스코), is a convention and exhibition center located in Centum City, Haeundae District, Busan, South Korea. It features over 46,500 m^{2} of exhibition space and 53 meeting rooms. In June 2012, BEXCO completed its expansion to add a 4,002-seat auditorium and a new exhibition center.

BEXCO has hosted a variety of events, notability as a concert venue for Koreans as well as international artists, such as Grammy Award winners Michael Bolton and Dr. Dre.

== Events ==
- 2002 FIFA World Cup Group Draw: 1 December 2001
- 2002 Asian Games and 2002 FESPIC Games International Broadcast Center and Main Press Center : 16 September to 28 October 2002
- 2004 Mariah Carey: Charmbracelet World Tour – 13 February 2004
- 2005 APEC Summit: 15 to 21 November 2005
- 2009 OECD World Forum on Statistics, Knowledge and Policy: 27 to 30 October 2009
- 6th Busan International Motor Show: 24 May to 3 June 2012
- Jason Mraz: world Tour concert – 8 June 2012
- 2011 the Fourth High-Level Forum on Aid Effectiveness in Busan: 9 November to 1 December 2011
- 2012 the 95th Lions Clubs International Convention: 22 to 26 June 2012
- Elton John: 40th Anniversary of the Rocket Man – 29 November 2012
- The 10th Assembly of the World Council of Churches: 30 October to 8 November 2013
- International Aerosol Conference 2014 August 2014
- 2014 League of Legends World Championship Quarterfinals 3–6 October 2014.
- 2014 ITU Plenipotentiary Conference: 20 October to 7 November 2014
- 2014 ASEAN-Republic of Korea Commemorative Summit: 20 October to 7 November 2014
- 2015 Inter-American Development Bank (IDB) and the Inter-American Investment Corporation (IIC) Annual Meeting of the Boards of Governors : 26 to 29 March 2015
- 2016 Drone Show Korea: 28 to 29 January 2016
- 2018 League of Legends World Championship Group stage and Quarterfinals 10–17 Oct and 20–21 Oct
- 2019 Brawl Stars World Championship 15–16 Nov
- 2022 League of Legends Mid-Season Invitational 10–29 May

== See also ==
- G-Star
- Korea Railways & Logistics Fair
