= Woojin Industrial Systems =

South Korean rolling stock manufacturer

Woojin Industrial Systems Company Limited
- Native name: 우진산전
- Type: Private
- Industry: Railways; Buses
- Founded: 10 April 1974; 52 years ago
- Founder: Kim Young-chang
- Headquarters: Goesan, Chungcheongbuk-do, South Korea
- Area served: Worldwide
- Key people: Kim Young-chang (CEO)
- Products: Metros, buses, monorails
- Revenue: ₩556,489,513,955 (2025)
- Operating income: ₩48,104,962,606 (2025)
- Net income: ₩13,408,185,677 (2025)
- Total assets: ₩778,529,067,784 (2025)
- Total equity: ₩157,622,702,373 (2025)
- Number of employees: 673 (2025)
- Parent: Woojin Co., Ltd.
- Subsidiaries: Woojin Electric Sales Ui-Sinseol Urban Railway Woojin Metro Ui-Sinseol Woojin Metro Uijeongbu Woojin Metro Yangsan Woojin PRT Woojin Electric Woojin Industrial Technology Metro Tech J-Tech Metro Plus WOOJIN IS AMERICA INC. ISC APPLIED SYSTEMS CORP
- Website: https://www.wjis.co.kr/en/

- Woojin Industrial Systems
- Hangul: 우진산전
- Hanja: 宇進産電
- RR: Ujin sanjeon
- MR: Ujin sanjŏn

Woojin Industrial Systems (Korean: 우진산전) is a South Korean manufacturer of rolling stock including metro, electric bus, peoplemover and monorail vehicles. Its main business is the development of rolling stocks and their core electrical components.

== History ==
Woojin Industrial Systems was founded in 1974.

In 2011, the company established a local corporation and production plant in Los Angeles, and has since supplied broadcasting display devices, driver cabin devices, and auxiliary power devices to the Washington, Oregon, Massachusetts, and Utah Department of Transportation. Woojin was selected by Los Angeles Metro in 2024 to refurbish the Breda A650 rail fleet in time for the 2028 Summer Olympics.

In 2016, the company entered the electric bus sector. In 2024, an electric bus factory capable of producing 1,500 buses per year was completed in Gimcheon, North Gyeongsang Province.

== Railway products ==
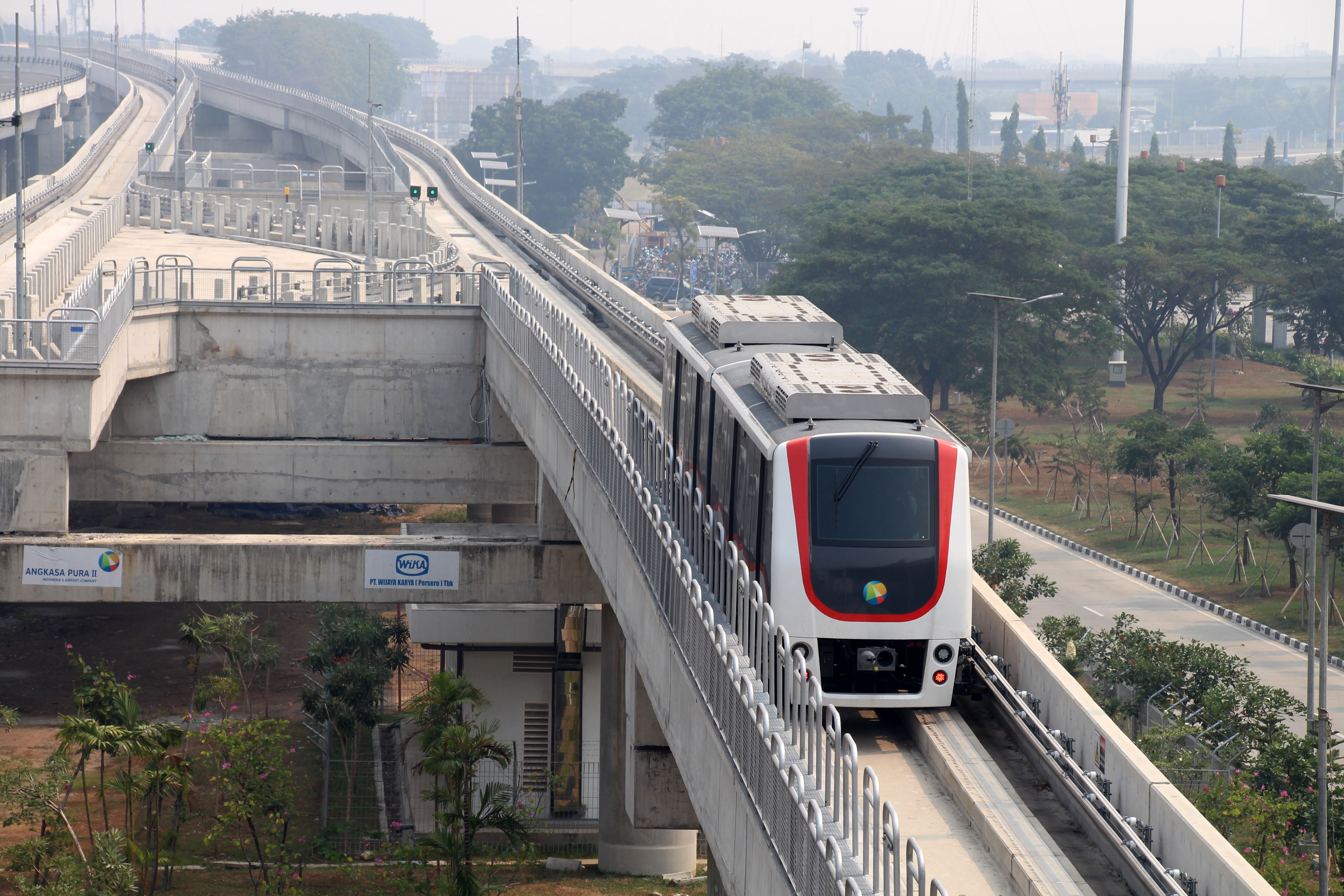
Soekarno–Hatta Airport Skytrain

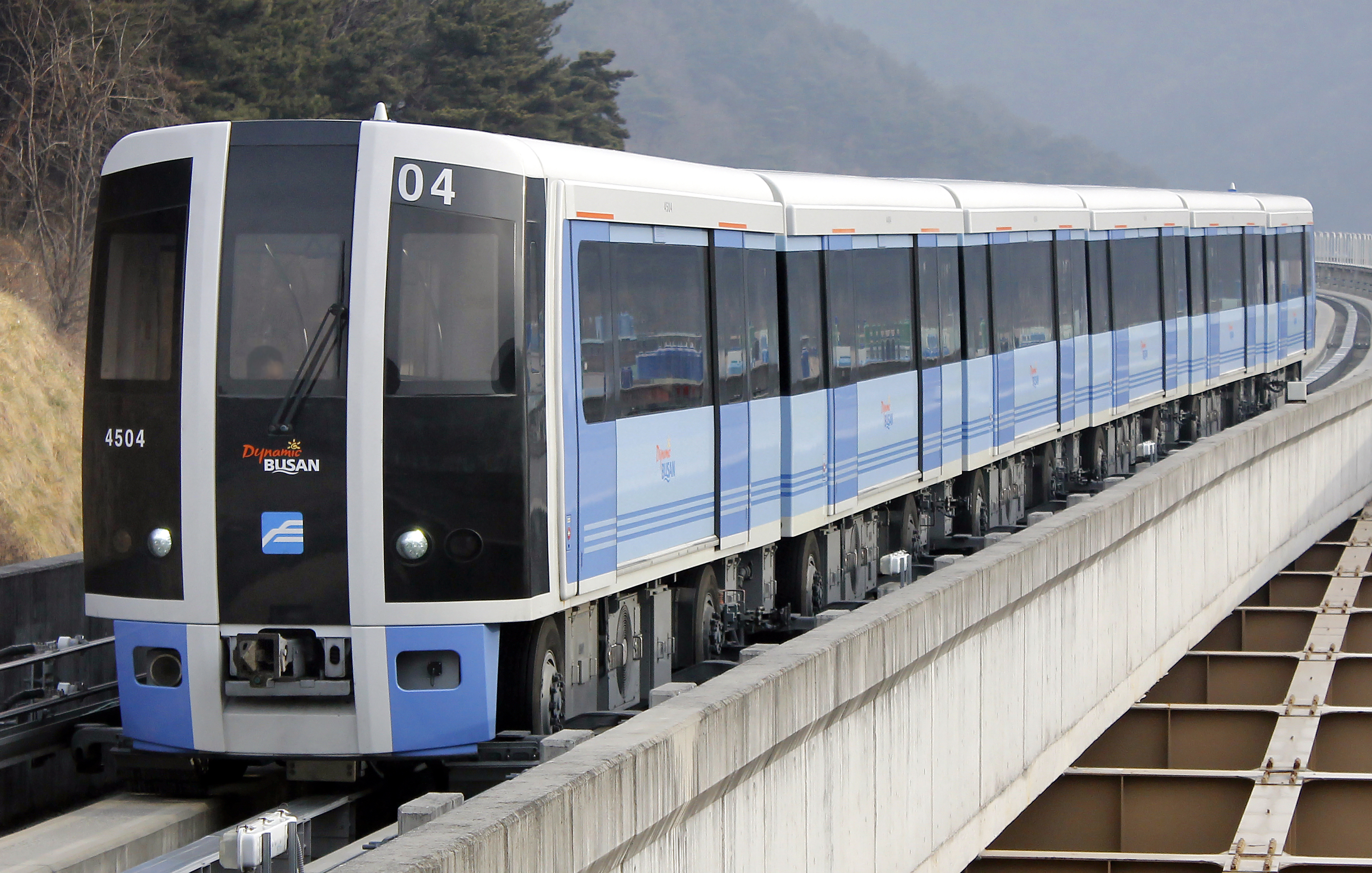
Busan Metro EMU Class 4000

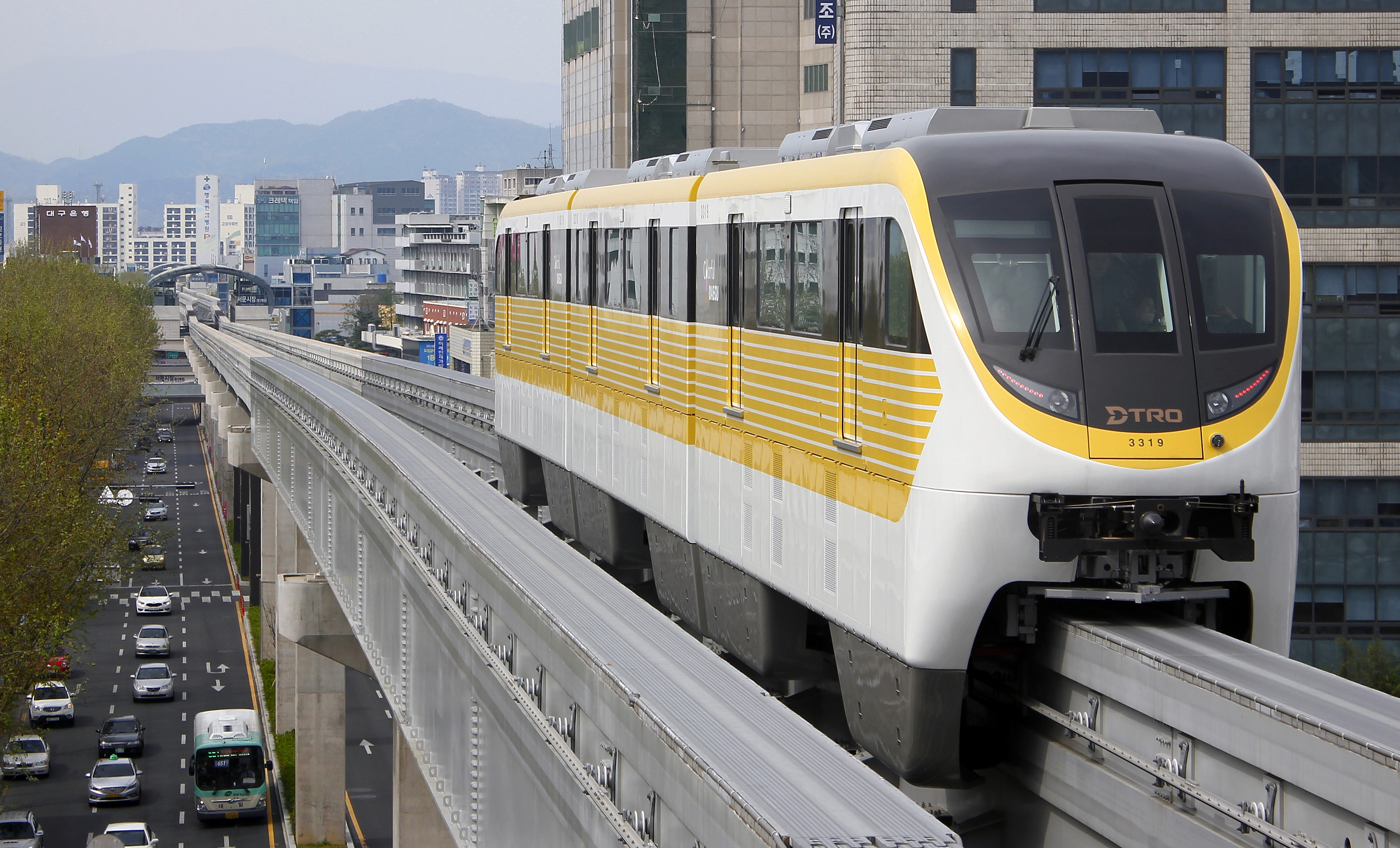
Daegu Metro Class 3000 monorail

=== Rolling stock ===
==== Electric multiple units ====
- South Korea
  - Korail Class 312000
  - Korail Class 3000
  - Seoul Metro 4000 series
  - Seoul Metro 5000 series
  - Seoul Metro 7000 series
  - Seoul Metro 8000 series
  - Busan Metro 1000 series

==== Diesel multiple units ====
- Indonesia – Kualanamu Airport Rail Link

==== Peoplemovers / Rubber-tyred metro ====
- Indonesia – Soekarno–Hatta Airport Skytrain
- South Korea
  - Busan Metro 4000 series
  - Sillim Line, Seoul
  - Incheon International Airport automated peoplemover

==== Monorails ====
- South Korea – Daegu Metro Class 3000 (straddle-beam monorail, with components supplied by Hitachi Rail)

==== Trams ====
- South Korea – Wirye Line (low-floor tram, 5 modules each 7.6 m, total length 33.9, battery powered)

=== Core and auxiliary electrical components ===
- Philippines – Manila LRT LRTA 2000 class
  - Provision of new train propulsion and monitoring systems for three trainsets
- Taiwan – Taiwan Railway EMU500 trains
  - Provision of new static inverters for upgrade of 63 trainsets (sub-contracted by Mitsubishi Electric)

=== Major train refurbishment ===
- Malaysia – KTM Class 83
  - Refurbishment of 16 trainsets
- United States – LA Metro Breda A650 trains
  - Refurbishment of 74 cars (37 trainsets)

== Electric buses ==
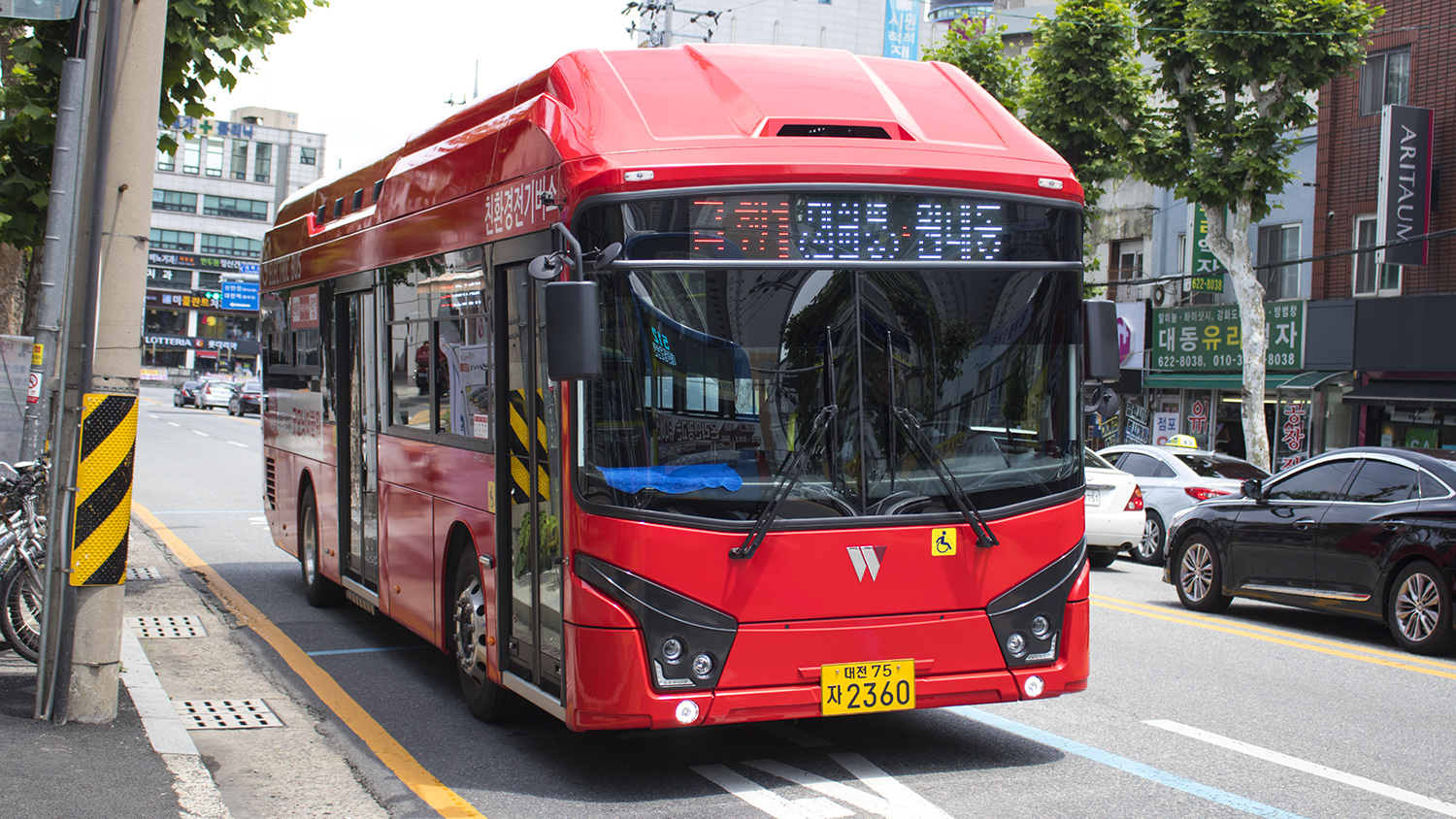
Apollo 1100

Woojin Apollo is a plug-in electric low-floor bus series. It was first unveiled at the 2017 Daegu International Future Auto Expo held at EXCO in Daegu, and is produced at the Ochang Plant in Cheongju City, North Chungcheong Province.

- Woojin Apollo 700
- Woojin Apollo 900
- Woojin Apollo 1100
- Woojin Apollo 1200

An electric bus smart factory has been in operation at the Industrial Complex in Gimcheon City since 2024. The company has been mass producing electric buses at the factory since the second half of 2024, and plans to invest about 40 billion won in 2025 to produce more than 1,500 units per year.

In South Korea, the factory is the second largest in terms of production capacity, following Hyundai Motor Company, the country's other bus manufacturer.

== See also ==
- Economy of South Korea
- Hyundai Rotem
- Dawonsys
- Sung Shin Rolling Stock Technology
