= Hyundai Green City =

Heavy duty bus

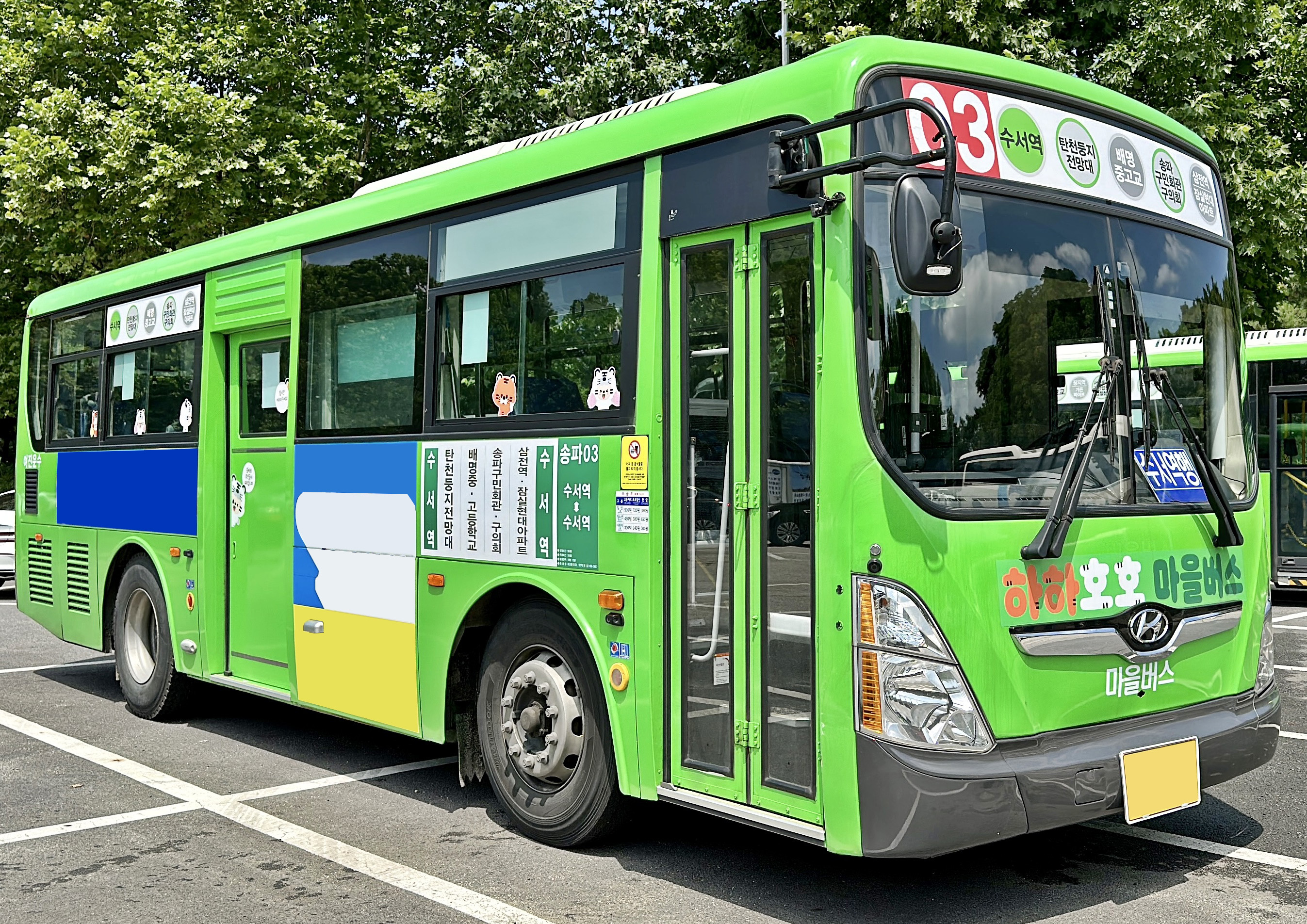

Overview
- Manufacturer: Hyundai Motor Company
- Production: 2010–2024
- Designer: Hyundai Motor Company Design Center

Body and chassis
- Class: Rear wheel drive vehicles
- Body style: Bus
- Platform: Hyundai Bus Chassis
- Related: Hyundai Aero City, Bering Global 900, Bering Aero City, Elec City Town

Powertrain
- Engine: Diesel OM906 (2002-2007); Hyundai G Engine (2008-2024); CNG C6AB
- Transmission: 5-speed manual

Chronology
- Successor: Hyundai Elec City Town

The Hyundai Green City (hangul:현대 그린시티), previously the Hyundai Global 900 is a heavy-duty bus manufactured by the truck & bus division of Hyundai. Based on the Hyundai Aero City, it is primarily available as short-body city buses and tourist buses.

The Global 900's main competitors are the Kia AM, Daewoo BS090 and Daewoo BM090.

== First Generation (CY) 2002–2010 ==
The First Generation Hyundai Global 900 was introduced in 2002.

=== Global 900 (August 2002–October 2004) ===
The Global 900 was launched in 2002 with two engine options, the diesel version is powered by Mercedes Benz OM906LA and Hyundai C6AB for the CNG version.

=== New Global 900 (November 2004–January 2008) ===
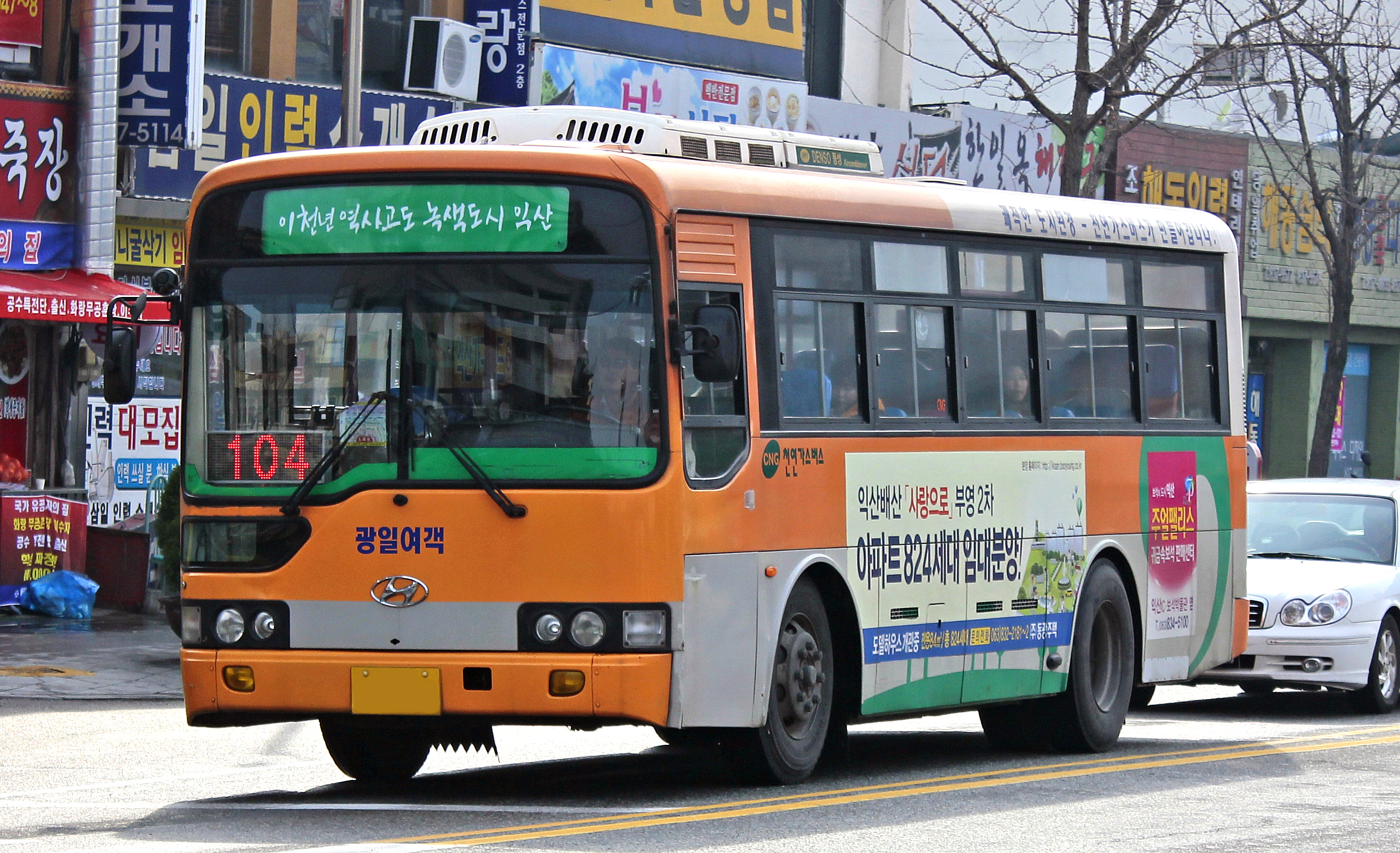
New Global 900 CNG Natural Gas Bus

In 2004, the engine options were now updated, the diesel version has the new Hyundai DB9A producing 260hp while the CNG version still comes with C6AB making 240hp.

In 2005, tourist versions are now available, the drivers protection bulkheads is now added as an option in 2006.

=== New Global 900 Facelift (January 2008–May 2010) ===
The Changes in 2008 is the replacement of the power antenna with the loop antenna. Diesel versions now comes with D6GA producing 250-255hp, D6GB producing 260hp, the CNG version is stuck with the C6AB still producing 240hp.

== Green City (2010–2024) ==
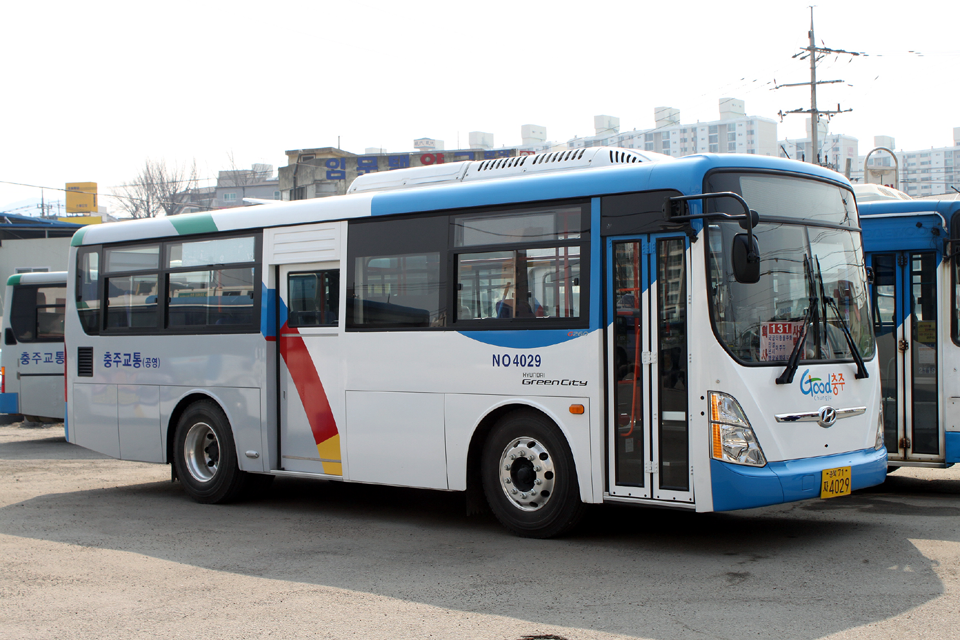
Green City

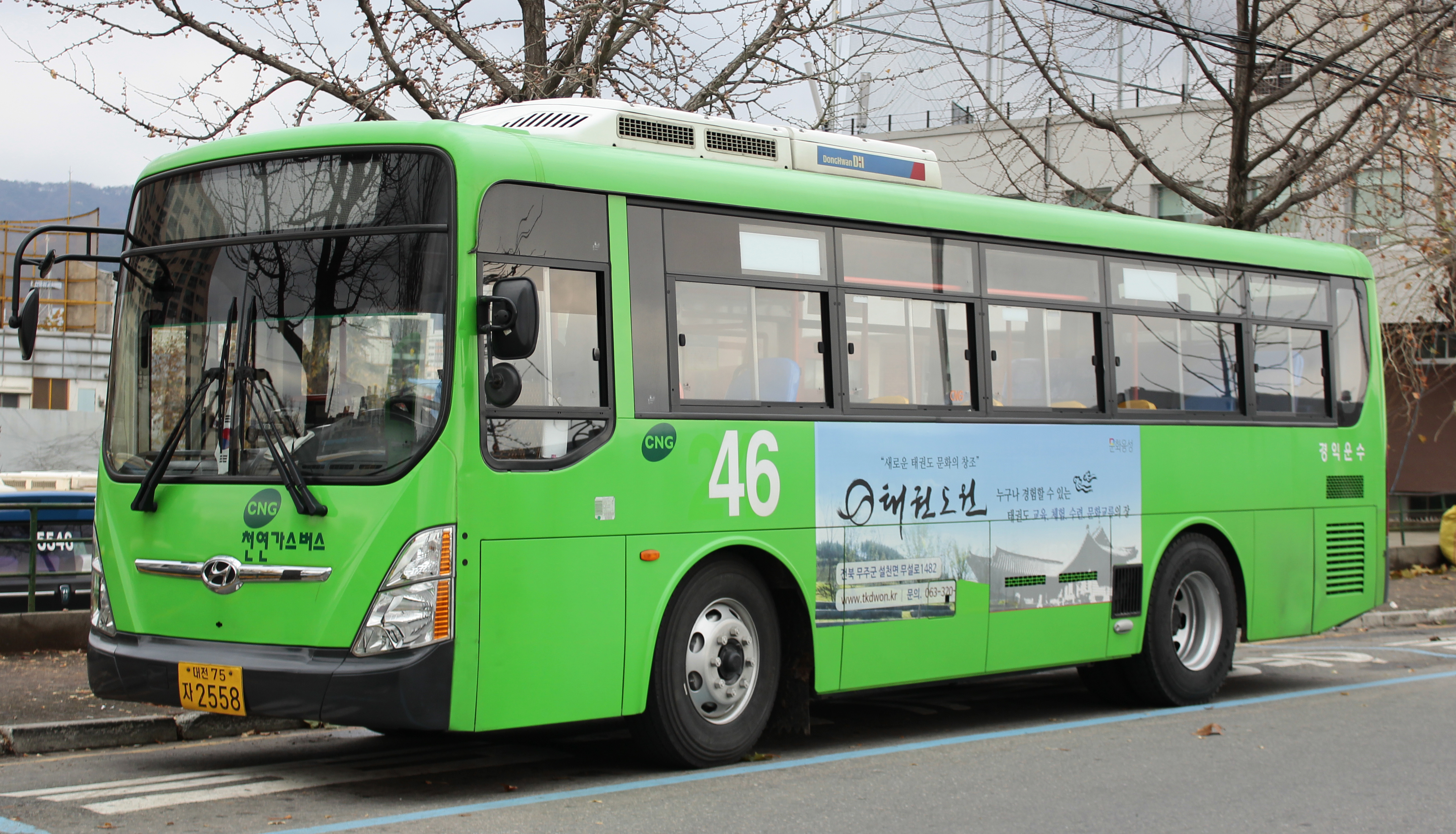
Green City CNG Natural Gas Bus

The Green City was launched in May 2010 with several changes, the CNG version has the new Euro 4 G240 replacing the C6AB and new taramat flooring. In 2011 CD Audio and MP3 player was added. In 2012, the G260 Euro 5 260hp engine is now added, and in 2015 the G280 Euro 6 280hp engine is also added.

In 2017, the ultrasonic sensors and Call buzzers were added, and USB ports were also added to the audio system.

Due to the mandatory delivery of low-floor buses from January 19, 2023, it was confirmed that all Hyundai Motor Company's urban high-floor buses will be discontinued from January 2024, and product information was completely deleted from the high-floor homepage on January 3 of that year.

== Lineup ==
- City Bus (LM-C)
  - LM-EC (City Bus)
  - LM-FC
- Intercity Bus/Private (LM-A)
  - LM-GA
  - LM-AA

== See also ==
- Hyundai Motor Company
- Hyundai Aero
- Hyundai Aero City
- Hyundai Elec City Town
