= Hyundai Aero City =

Hyundai Aero City/New Super Aero City
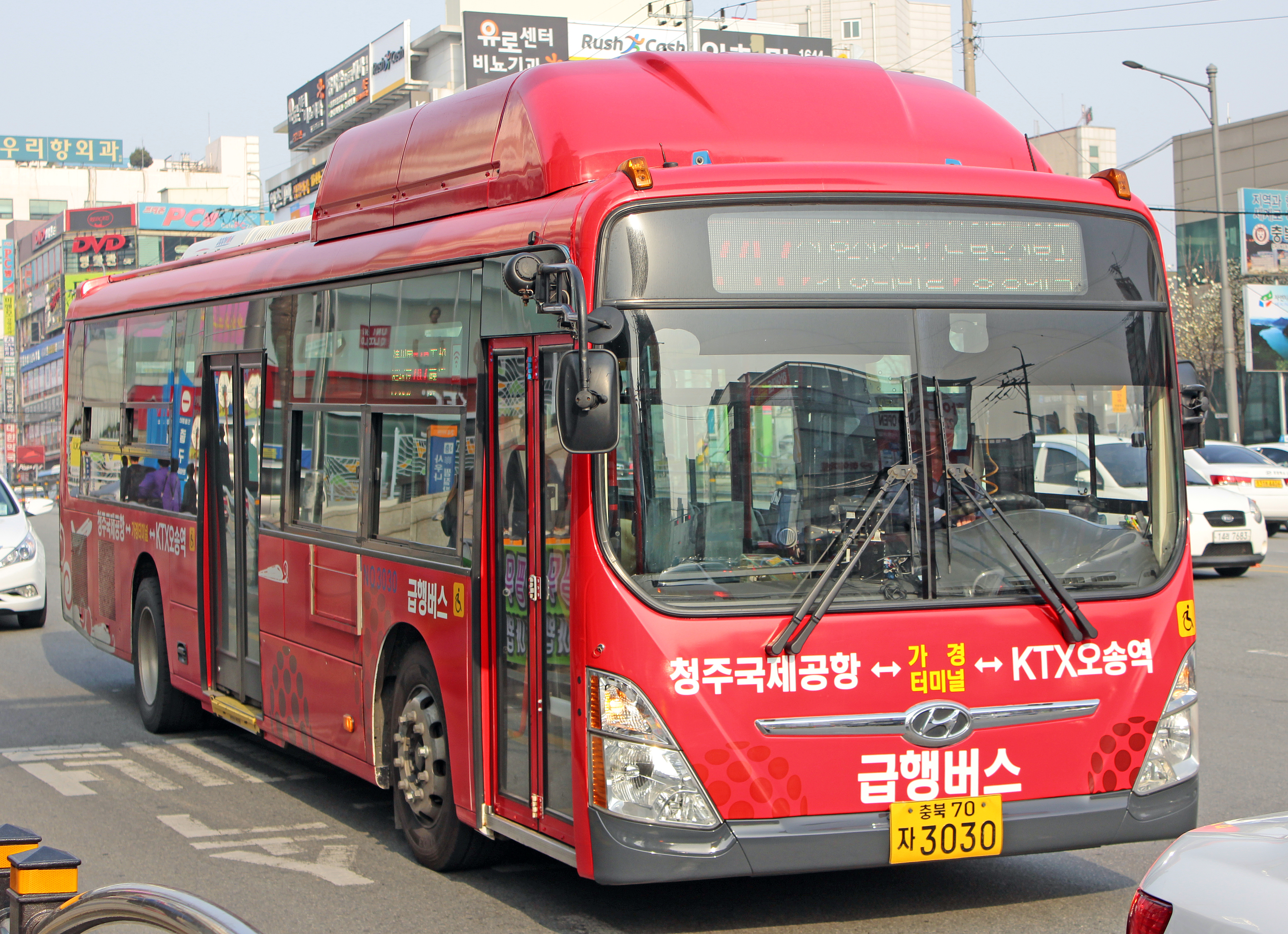

Overview
- Manufacturer: Hyundai Motor Company; Mitsubishi Fuso
- Also called: Hyundai New Super Aero City; TC Motor Hyundai Ecoline B80EV (Vietnam)
- Production: 1991–present
- Assembly: Wanju, South Korea; Santa Rosa, Laguna, Philippines (HARI); Biñan, Laguna, Philippines (JK Motors Corporation); Quezon City, Philippines (Del Monte Motor Works); Ninh Bình, Vietnam (Hyundai Thanh Cong Vietnam)
- Designer: Mitsubishi Fuso (1991–1994); Hyundai Motor Company Design Center (1994–present)

Body and chassis
- Class: Complete bus Bus chassis
- Body style: Single-decker bus
- Layout: Rear mid-engine, rear-wheel-drive
- Platform: Mitsubishi Fuso Aero Star (1991–1994); Hyundai Bus Chassis (1994–present)
- Doors: 2 doors
- Floor type: Low-entry; Step entrance
- Related: Hyundai Global 900; Hyundai Elec City

Powertrain
- Engine: Hyundai C6AF, D6AE, C6AC, D6HA, D6AV, D6AB-d
- Transmission: 5-speed manual 6-speed manual (1991–2000); 5-speed automatic (Allison (–2014), ZF (–2009)); 6-speed automatic

Dimensions
- Length: 10.955 meters (35.94 ft)
- Width: 2.490 meters (98.0 in)
- Height: 3.180 meters (10.43 ft) (3.200 m with air-conditioning)

Chronology
- Predecessor: Hyundai RB
- Successor: Hyundai Elec City

The Hyundai New Super Aero City (Hangul:현대 뉴 슈퍼 에어로시티) is a heavy-duty single-decker bus manufactured by the truck & bus division of Hyundai. It was introduced in 1991. It primarily used as a city bus and an intercity bus as either a complete bus or a bus chassis. It is distinguishable by a front 'Aero City' badge, but the common Hyundai badge is usually on the rear. The model's principal competitors is the Daewoo BS106 Royal City, but it also competed against the now-discontinued Kia AM bus series (originally Asia AM).

== First Generation (CY) 1991–2000 ==
The Aero City was launched as the successor to Hyundai RB, it is built on the Mitsubishi Fuso Aero Star chassis until 1994.

=== Aero City 520L ===
The 520L was produced from 1991 to 1994 with the wheelbase of 20 cm shorter than the Aero City 540.

=== Aero City 520SL ===
The 520SL is produced from 1991 until 1995 with low ground clearance than the 520 and 520L.

=== Aero City 540 ===
The 540 became available from 1991 to 2000 as an Intercity/City bus, in late 1997 the 280 horsepower D6AB was available.

=== Aero City 540L ===
The 540L is the same as the 540 with D6AB engine and an 8-pin Front and Rear wheel design.

=== Aero City 540SL ===
The 540SL is Low Ground Clearance than the 540 and 540L.

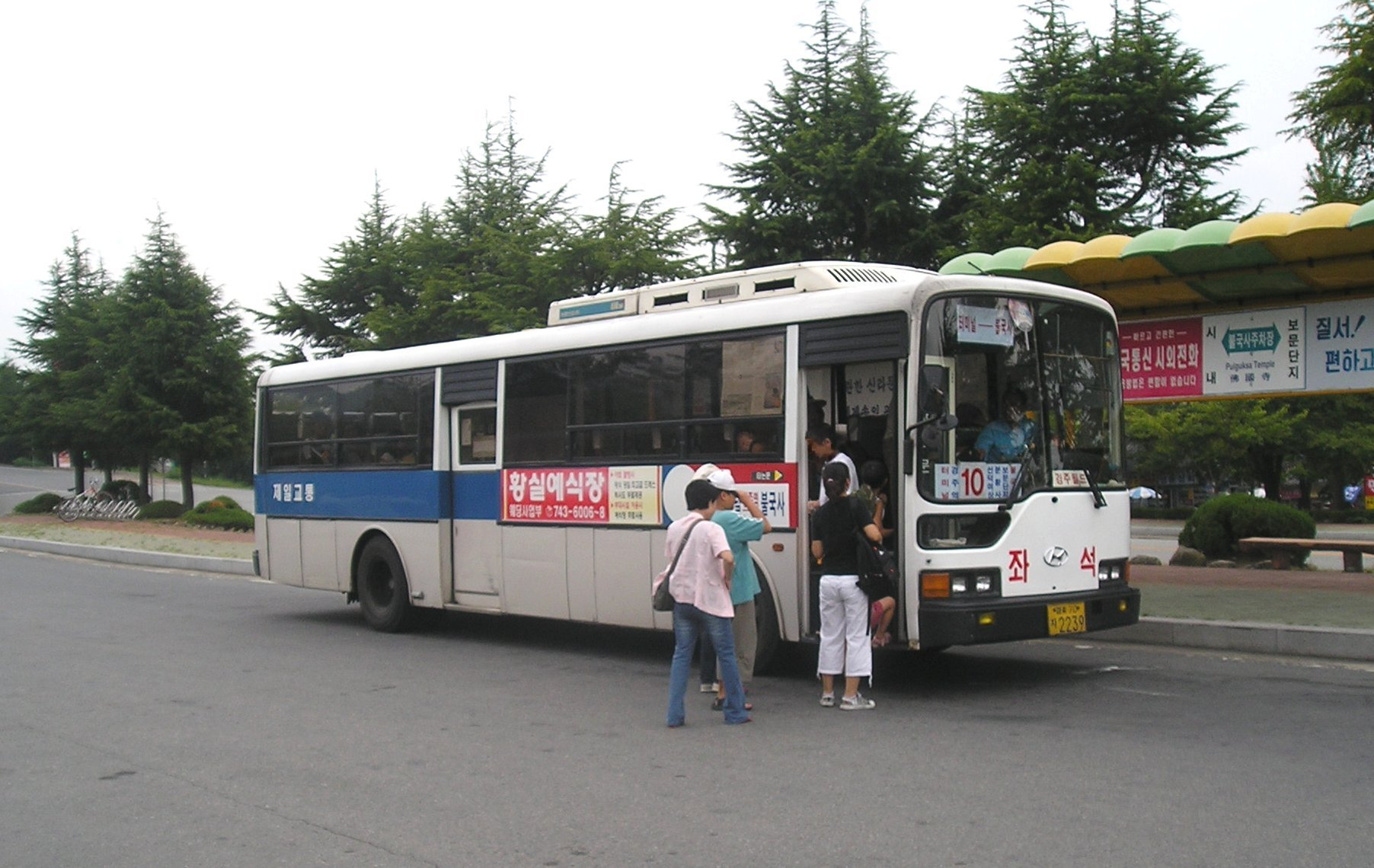
Hyundai Aero City 540

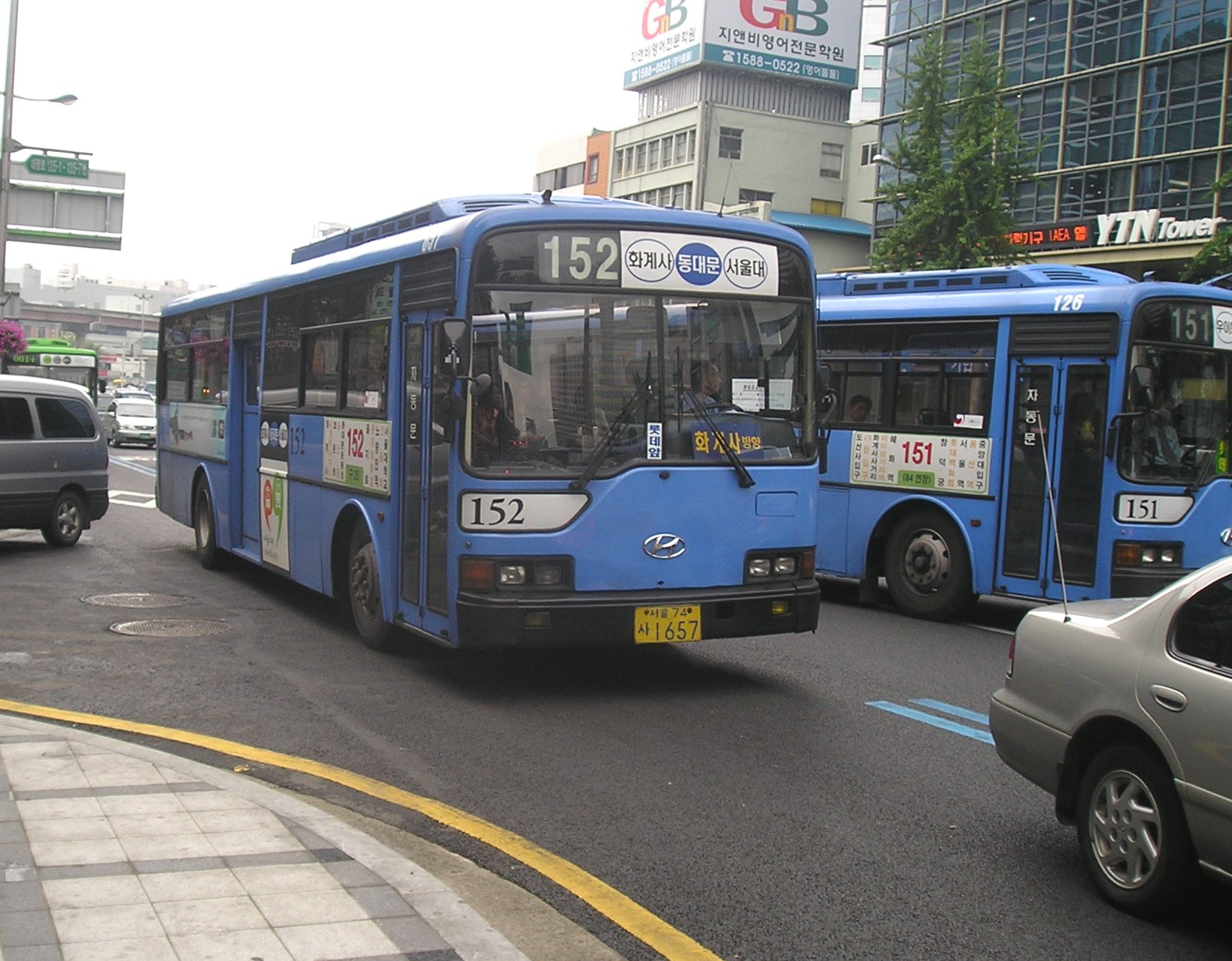
Hyundai Aero City 540SL

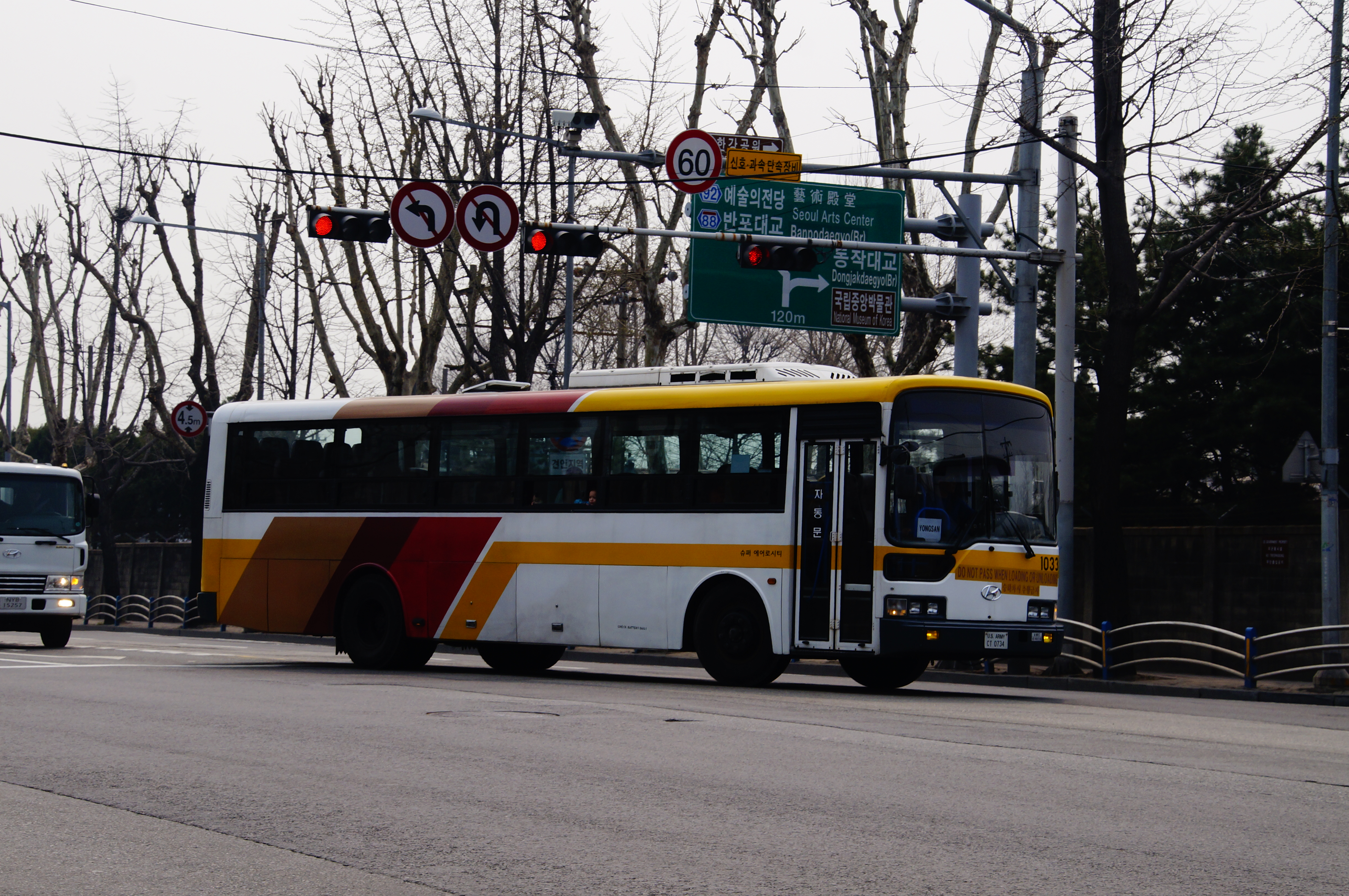
Hyundai Super Aero City AC540SL

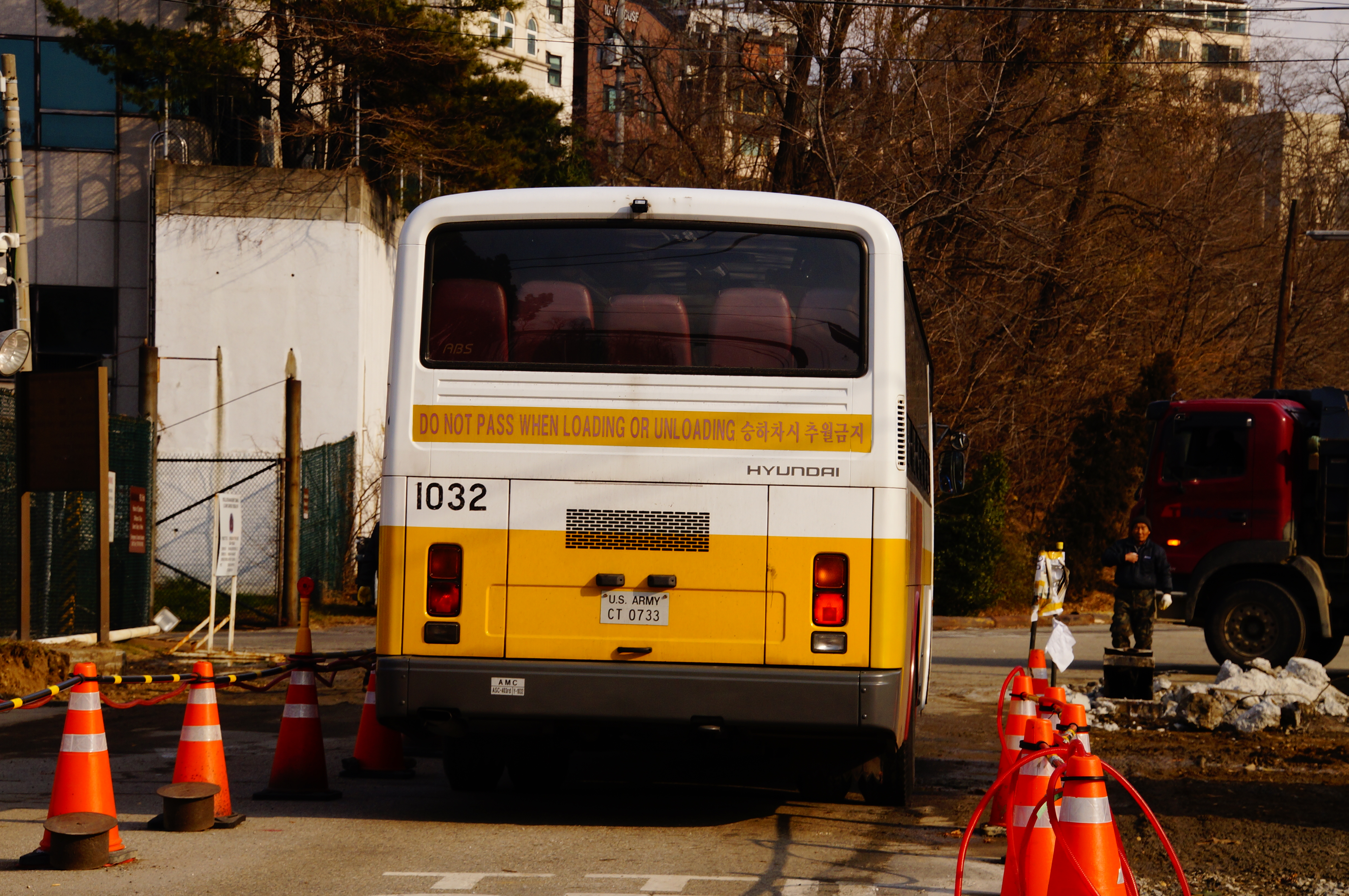
Hyundai Super Aero City AC540SL Rear

== Super Aero City (May 2000– October 2004) ==
The Super Aero City was launched in 2000 as successor to the Aero City 540/540L/540SL with three engine options, the diesel version is powered by D6AB still producing 280 horsepower and the Naturally Aspirated D6AV producing 235 horsepower, while the CNG version is powered by C6AB producing 290 horsepower.

=== Super Aero City L ===
The Super Aero City L has the interior elements from the Aero City 540L.

=== Super Aero City SL ===
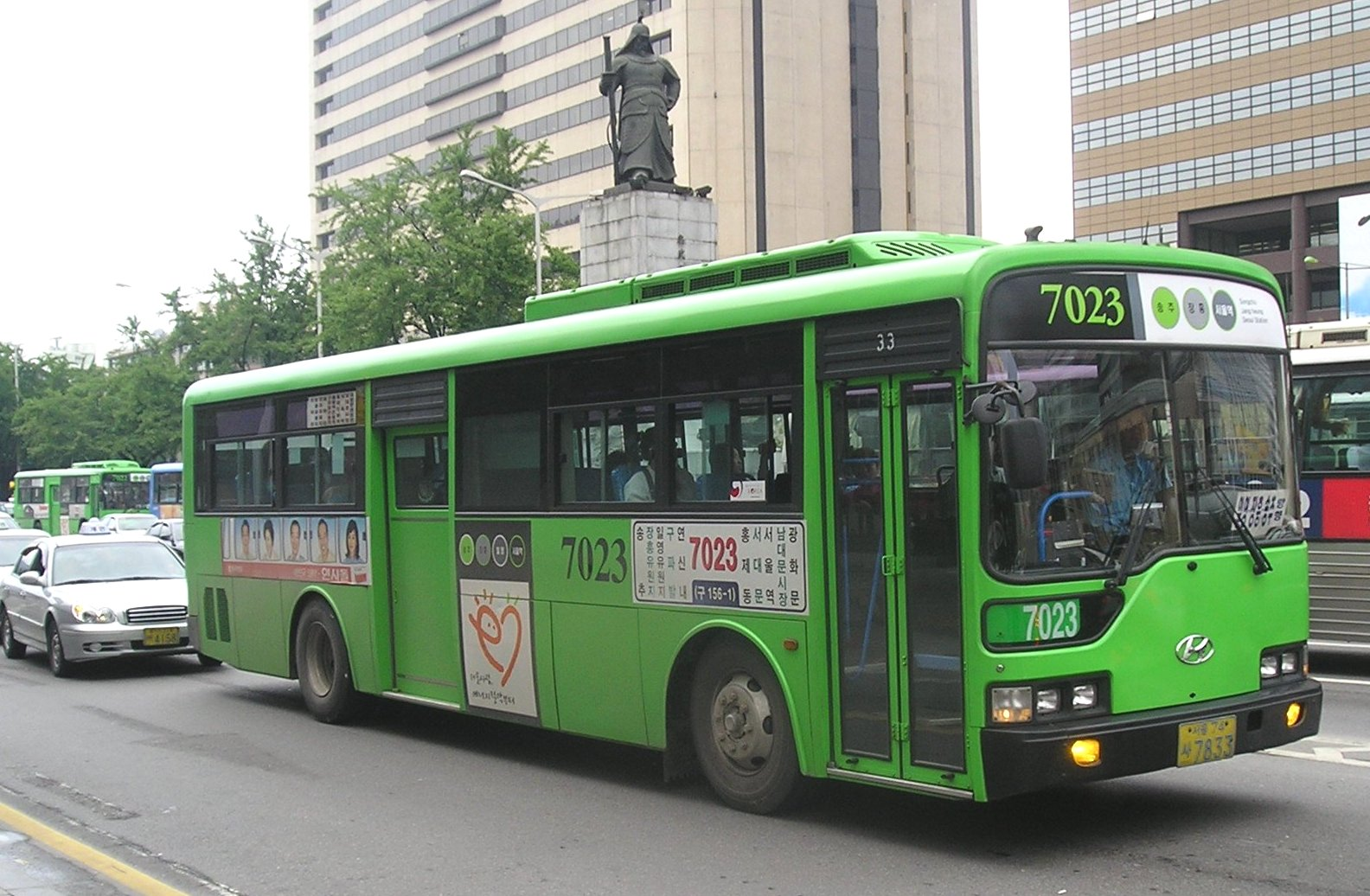
Super Aero City SL

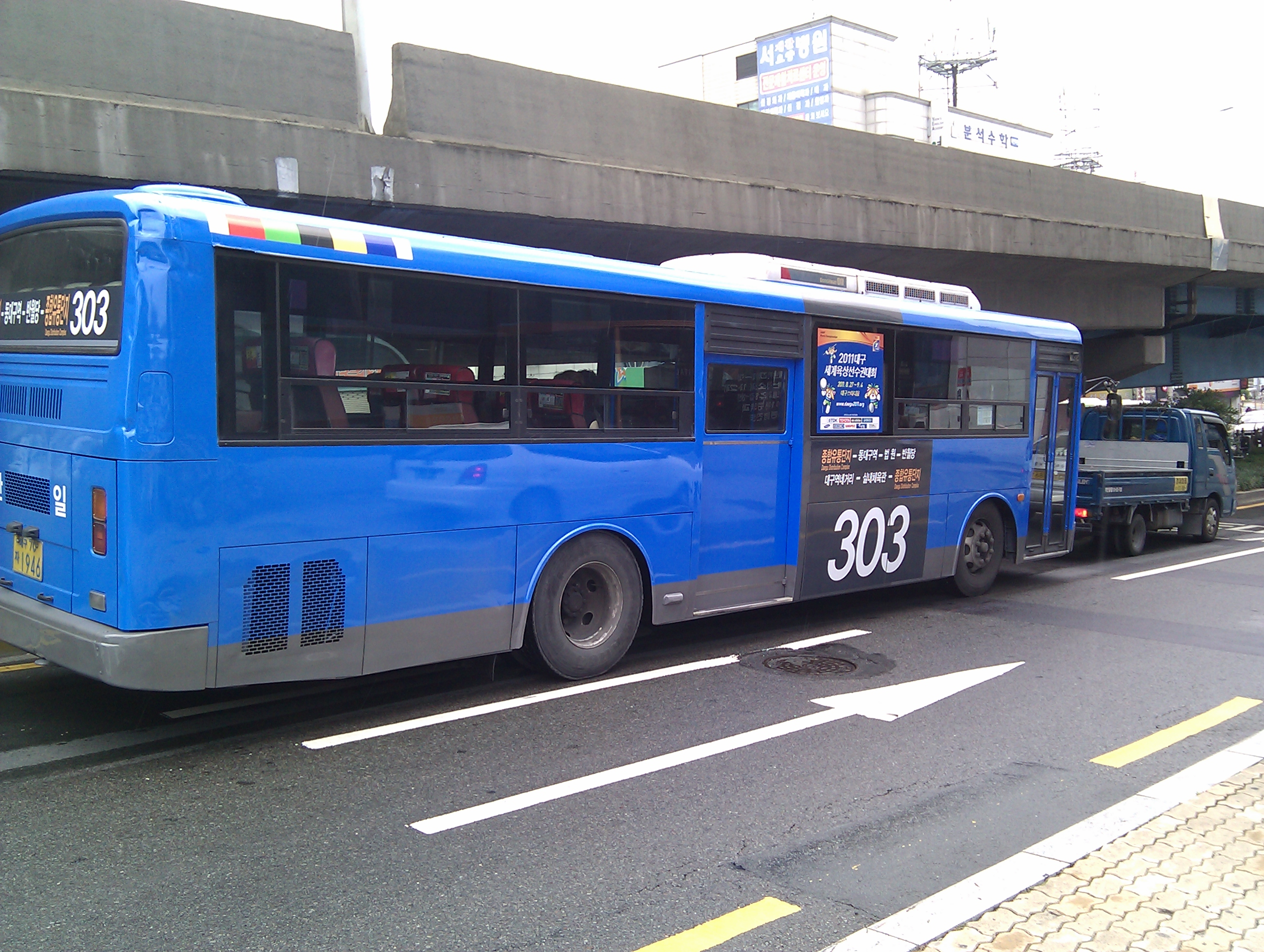
Hyundai Super Aero City AC540SL Bus.

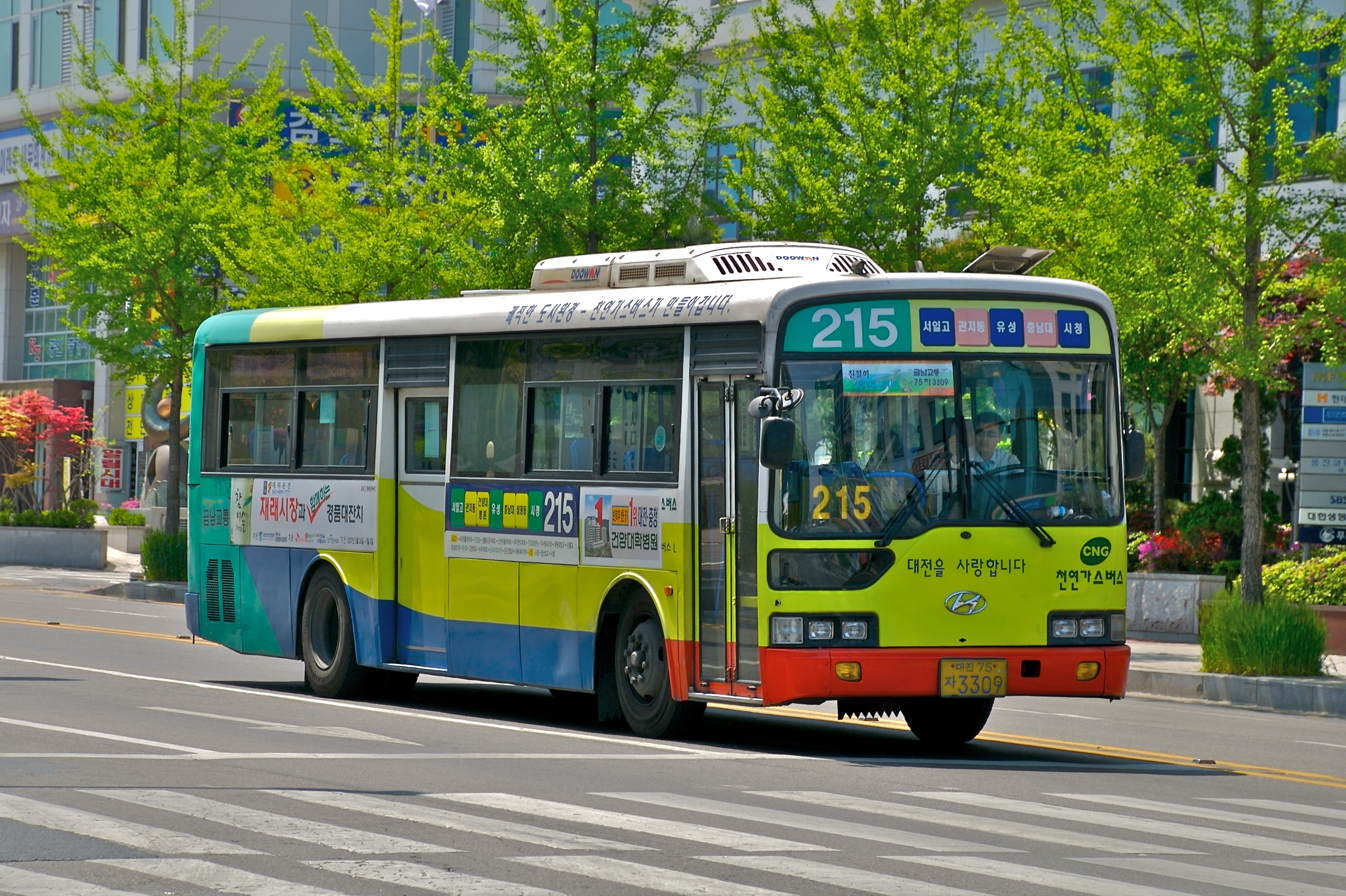
Hyundai Super Aero City AC540SL

Like the Super Aero City L, the Super Aero City SL has the interior elements from the Aero City 540SL, the Super Aero City SL is only offered in Diesel powertrain.

== New Super Aero City (November 2004–January 2008) ==
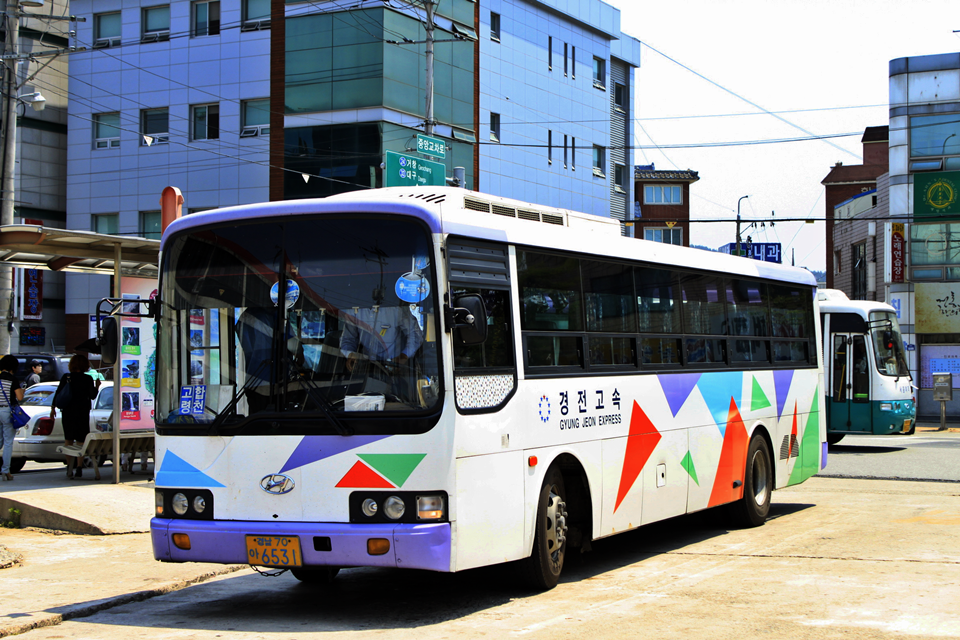
New Super Aero City From November 2004-January 2008.

The New Super Aero City was launched in 2005 and it is offered in Diesel or CNG.

=== New Super Aero City L ===
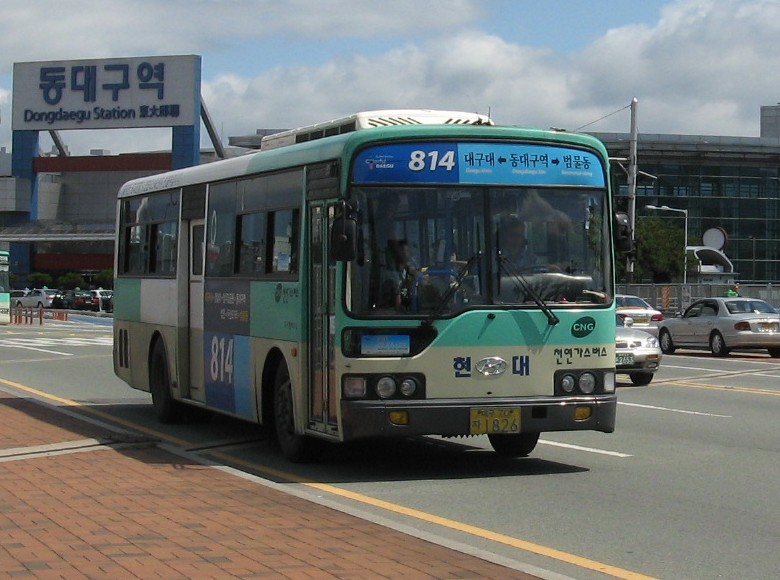
New Super Aero City L CNG Natural Gas Bus

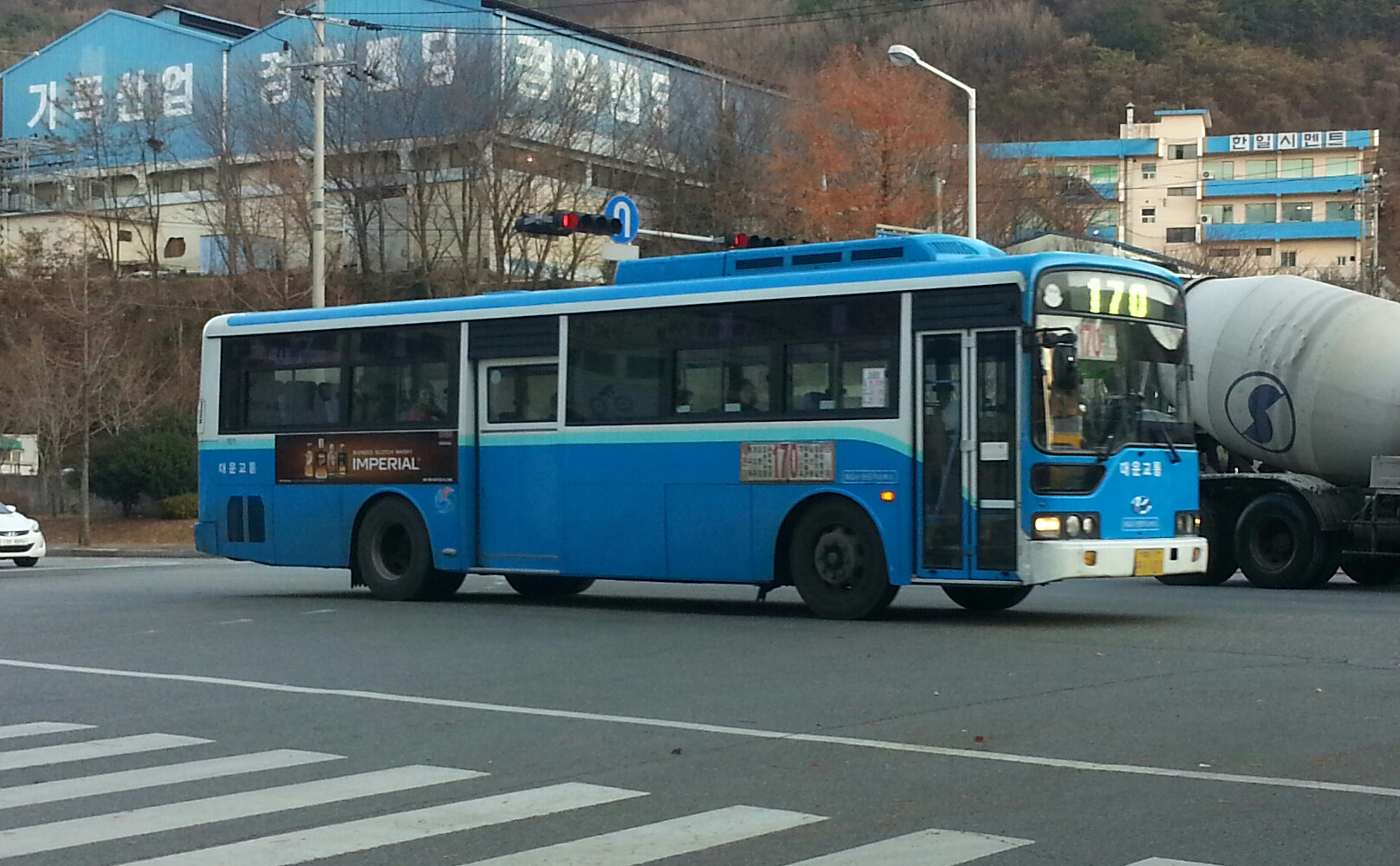
Hyundai New Super Aero City L CNG From 11/2004 To 1/2008

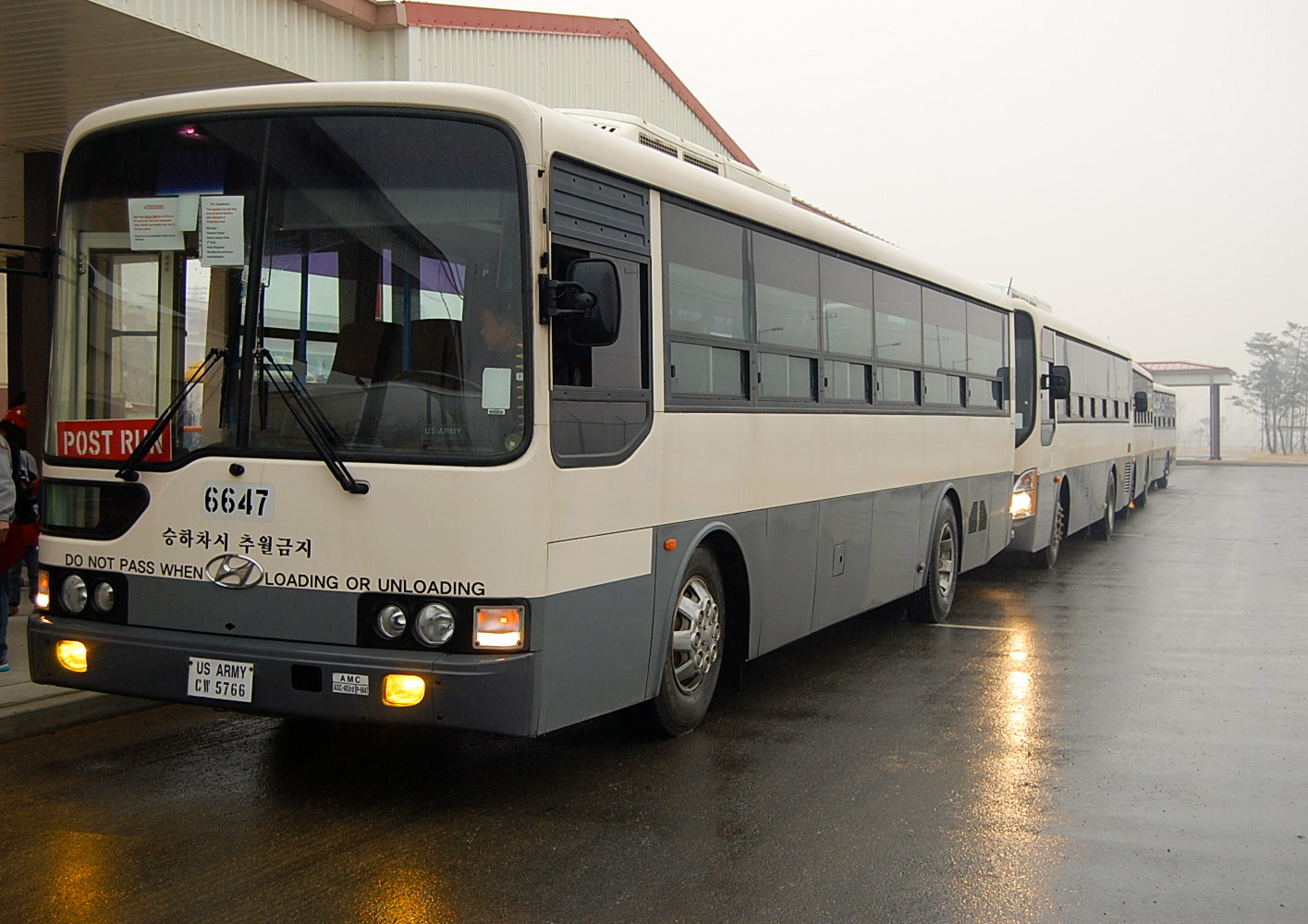
Hyundai New Super Aero City 2004 - 2008

The New Super Aero City L has integrated rear lamps and protective partitions installed in the driver's seat.

=== New Super Aero City SL ===
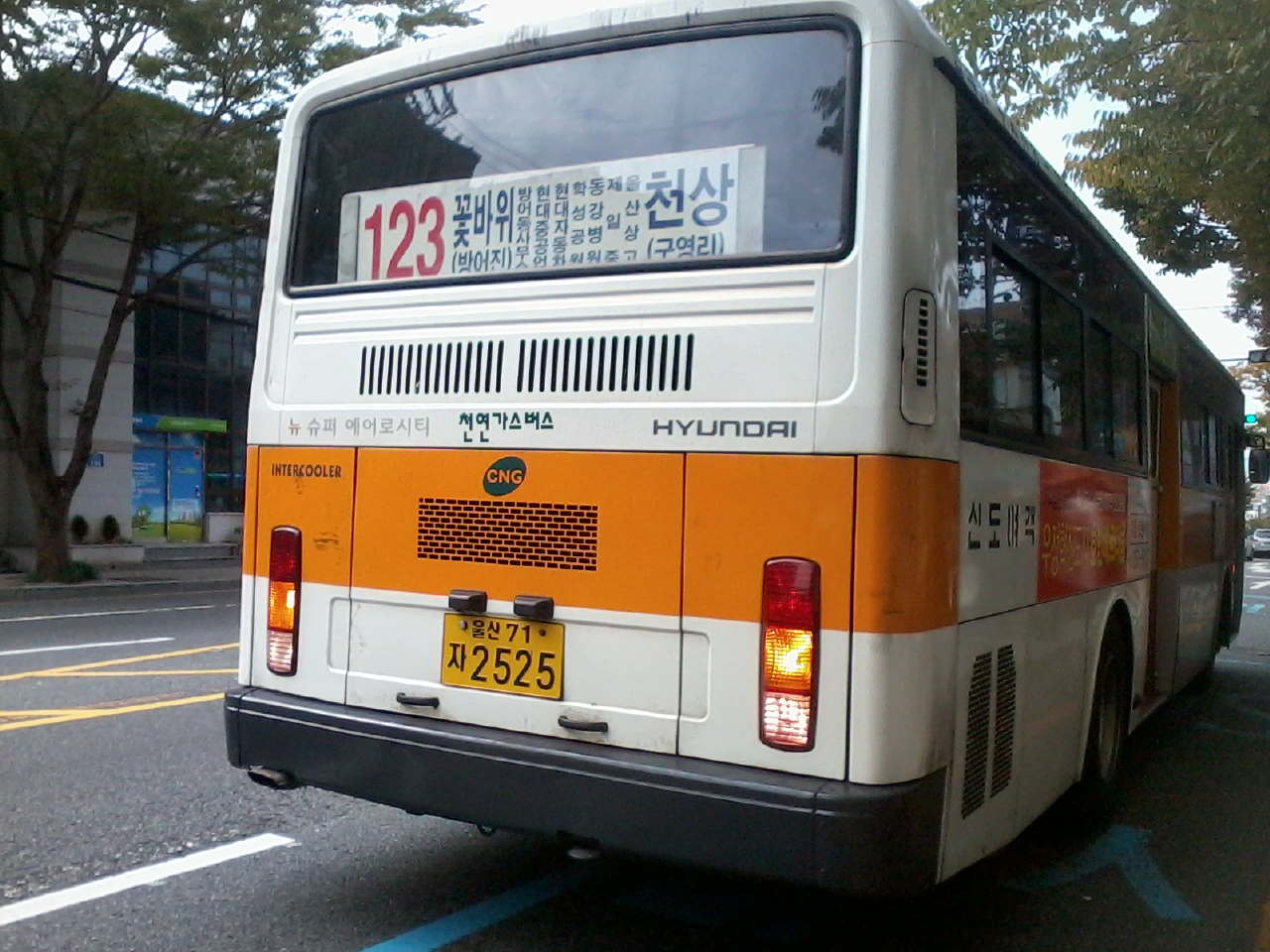
Hyundai New Super Aero City SL

The Super Aero City SL is produced between December 2004 to early 2006 with a lot of interior and exterior changes such as integrated rear lamps, fixed driver's side view mirror.

== New Super Aero City Low Floor (2005–2008) ==
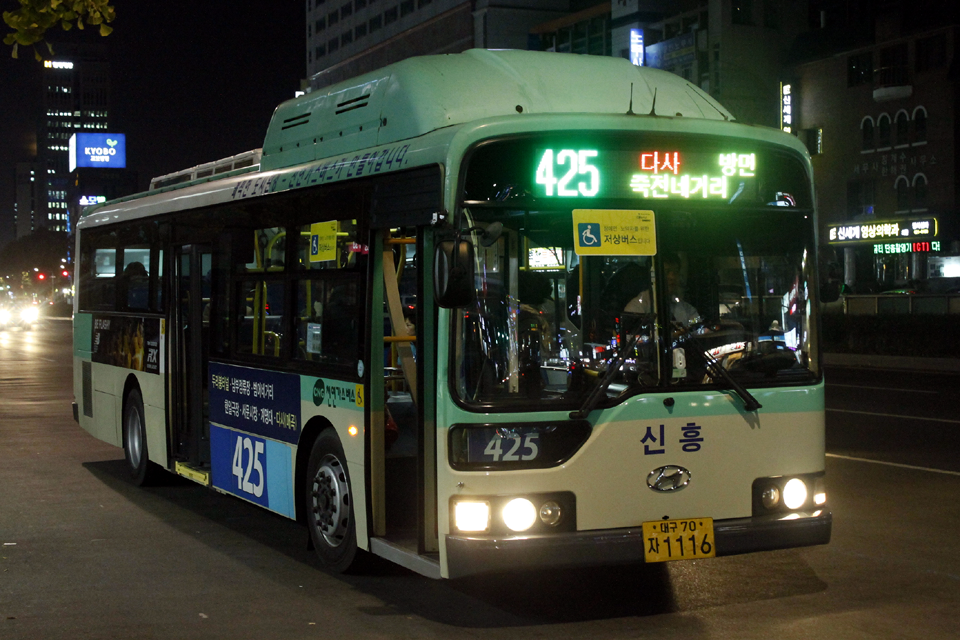
New Super Aero City Low Floor

The Low Floor version of the Super Aero City was launched in 2005, CNG and automatic transmission is standard.

== New Super Aero City F/L (February 2008–Jul 2018) ==
The New Super Aero City was launched in 2005 with its facelift similar to the Hyundai Universe. The CD type audio system and MP3 player was added in 2010, the air suspension is now added as an option in 2012, in 2015 the Inline-six H310 Euro 6 Diesel engine is introduced.

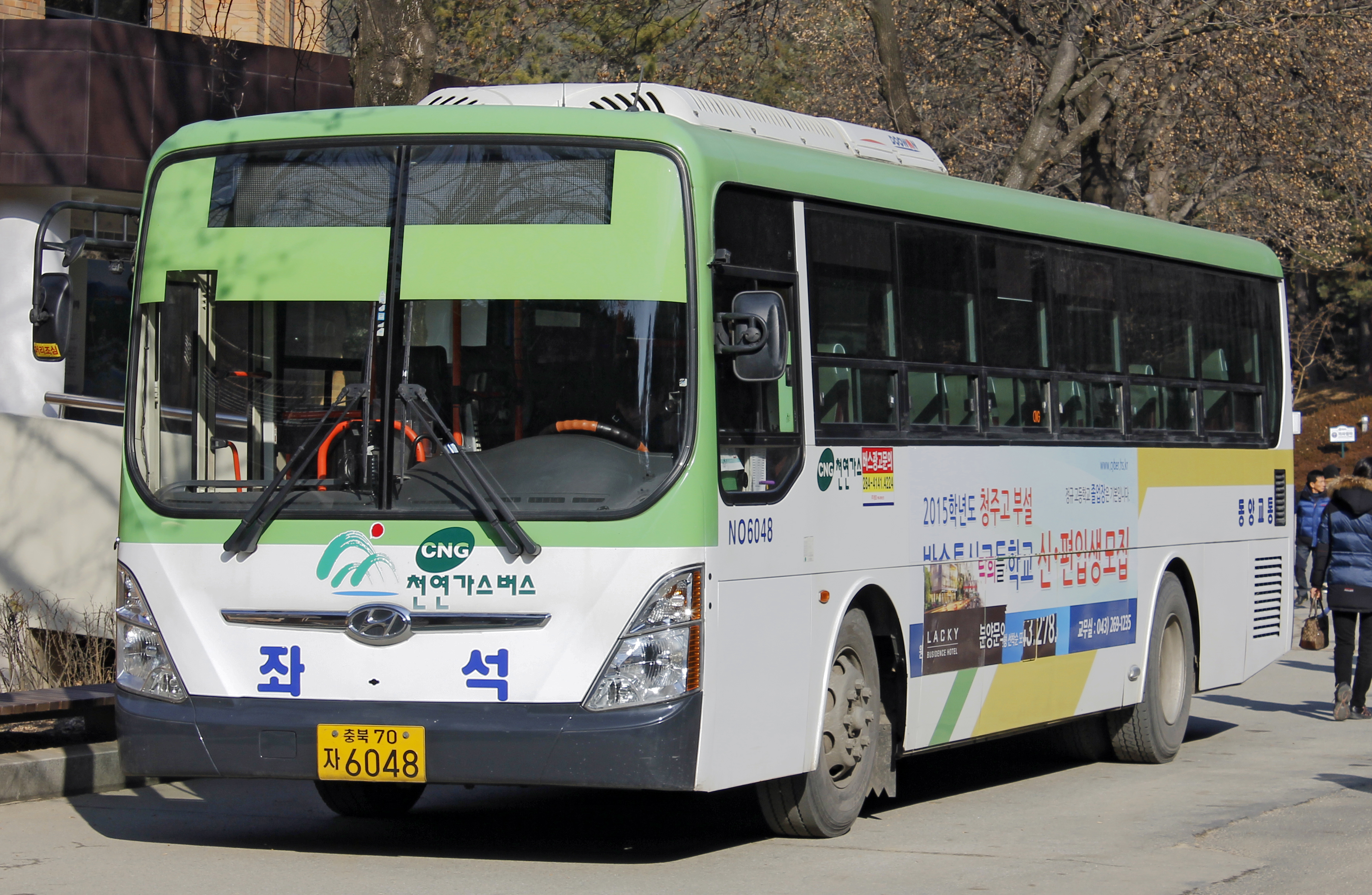
New Super Aero City Facelift.

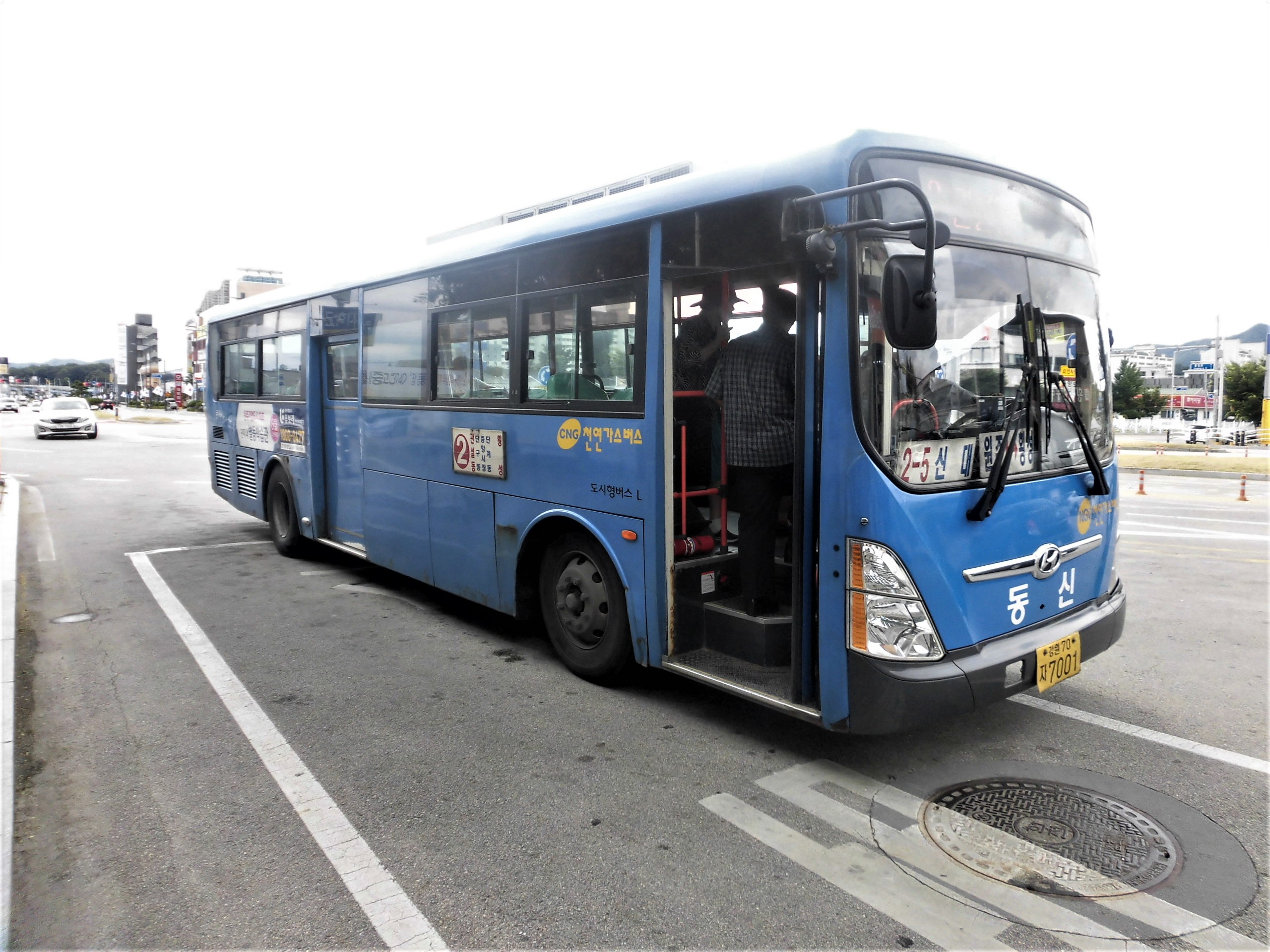
Hyundai New Super Aero City F/L CNG Bus

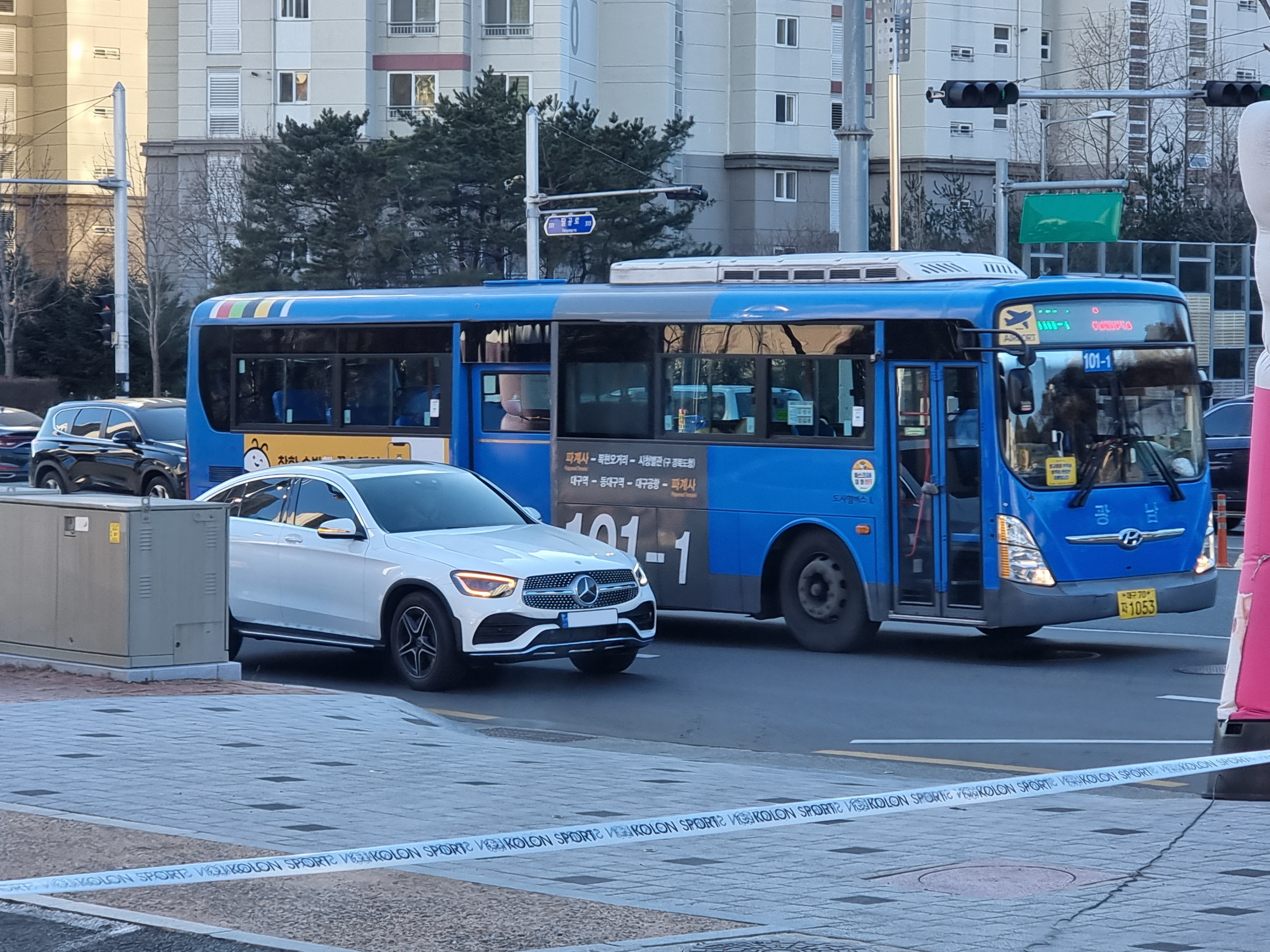
Hyundai New Super Aero City F/L CNG Bus 2008-2018

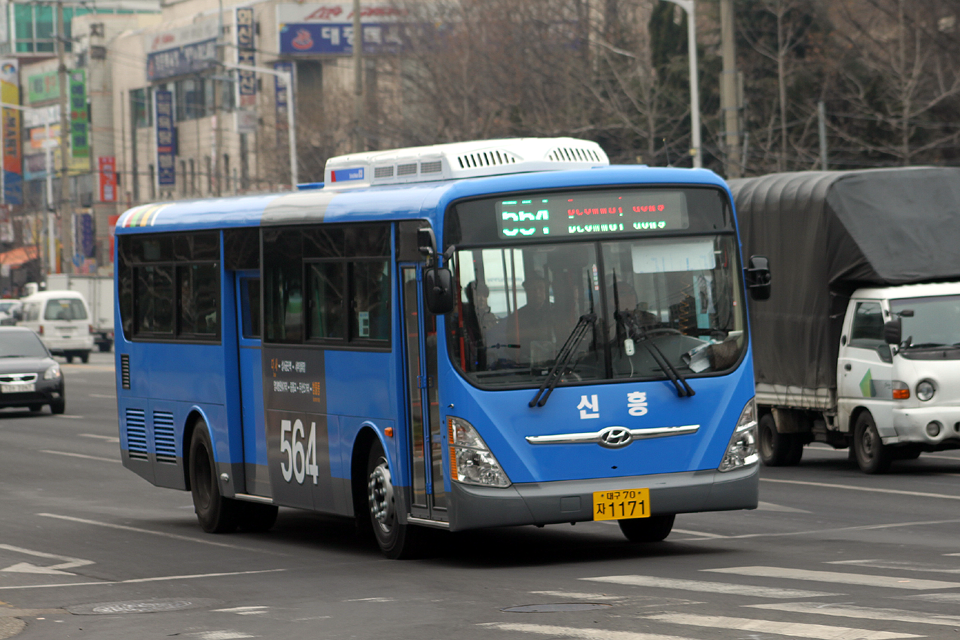
Hyundai New Super Aero City F/L CNG 2008-2018

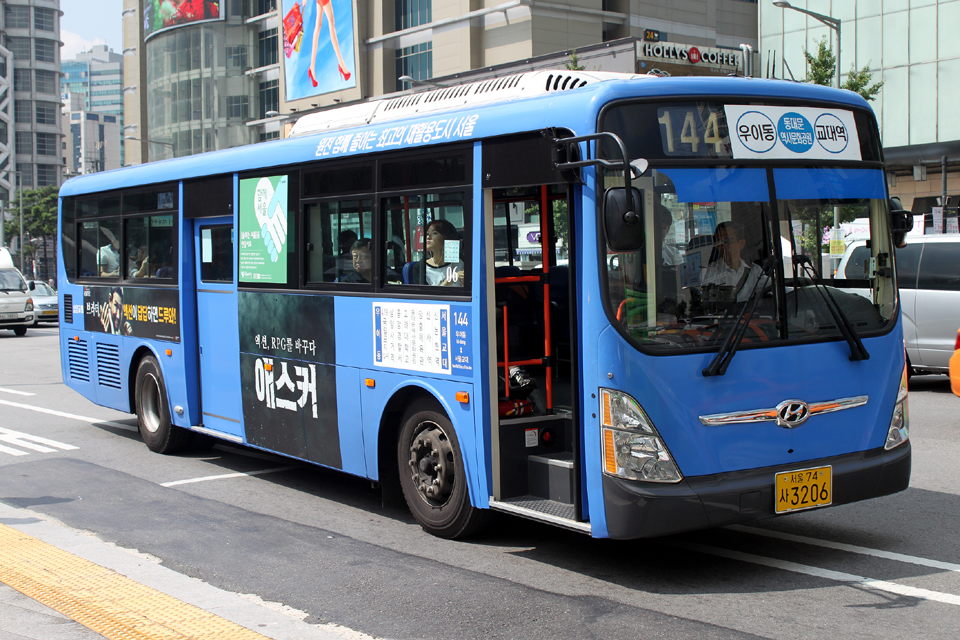
Hyundai New Super Aero City F/L CNG

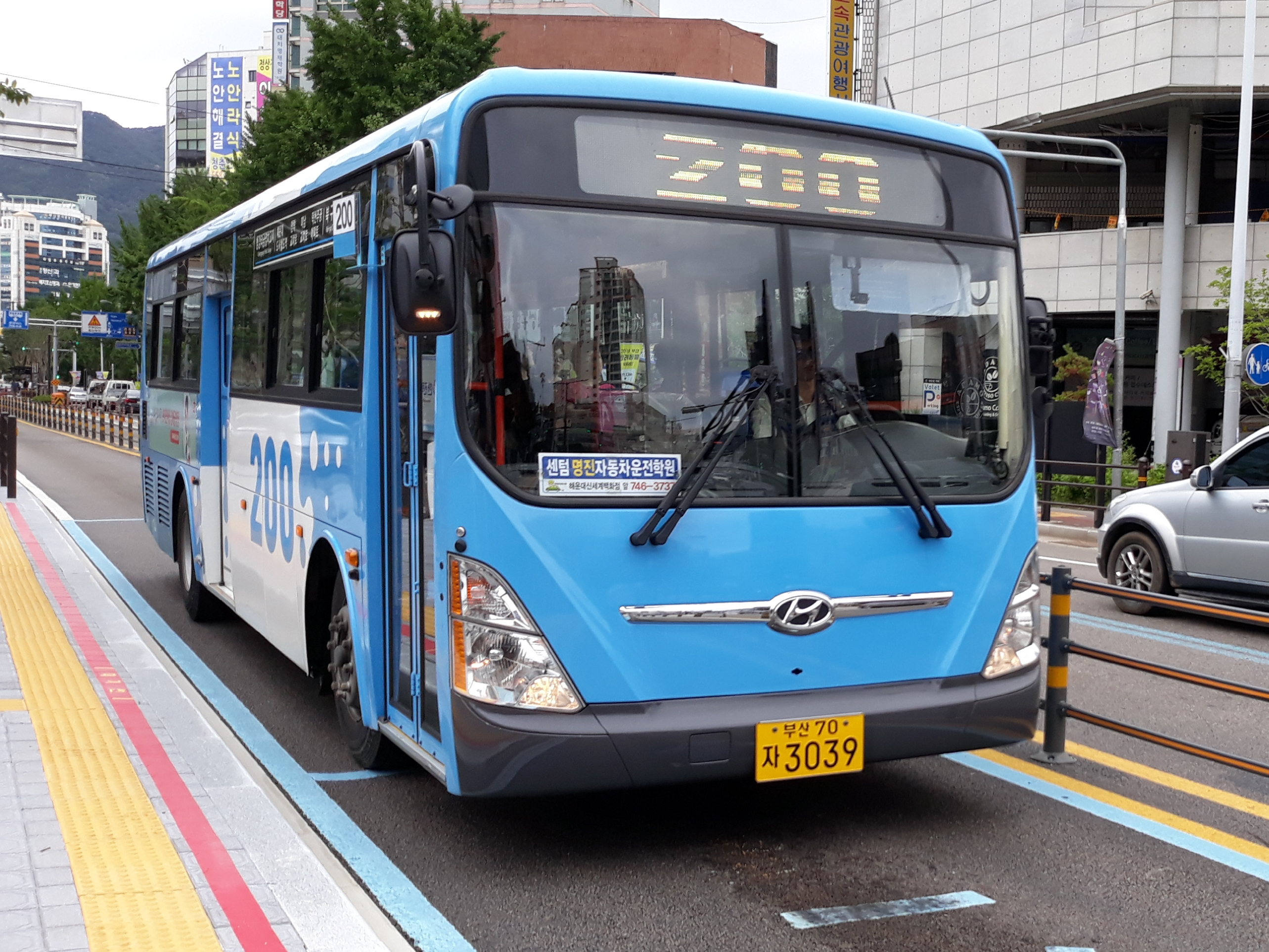
Hyundai New Super Aero City F/L CNG Bus From 2008 To 2018

== New Super Aero City F/L (Jul 2018–Jan 2024) ==
The New Super Aero City was launched in 2018 with its facelift similar to the Hyundai Universe. The CD type audio system and MP3 player was added in 2010, the air suspension is now added as an option in 2012, in 2015 the Inline-six H310 Euro 6 Diesel engine is introduced.

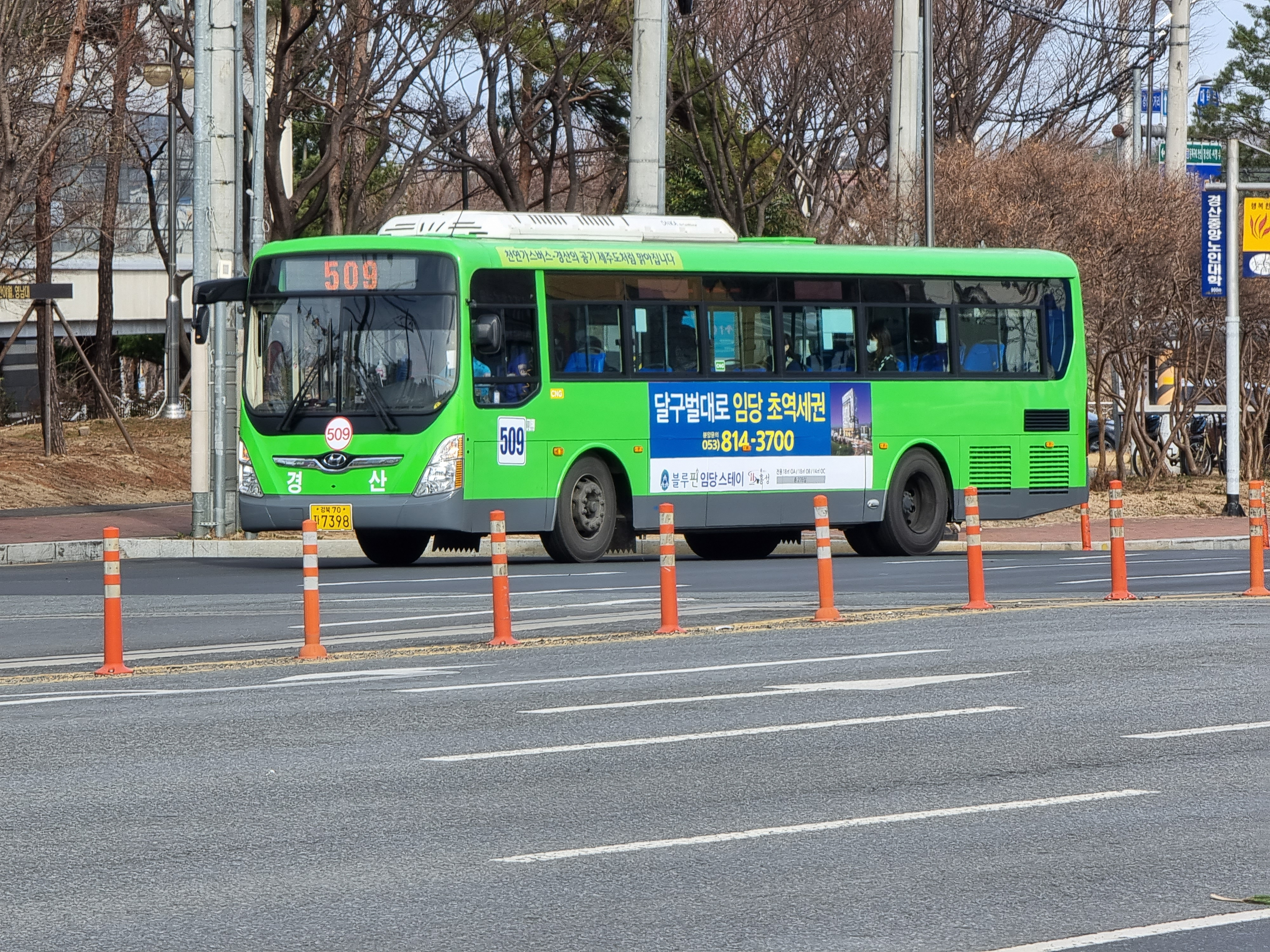
Hyundai New Super Aero City F/L CNG Compressed Natural Gas Bus 2018-2024

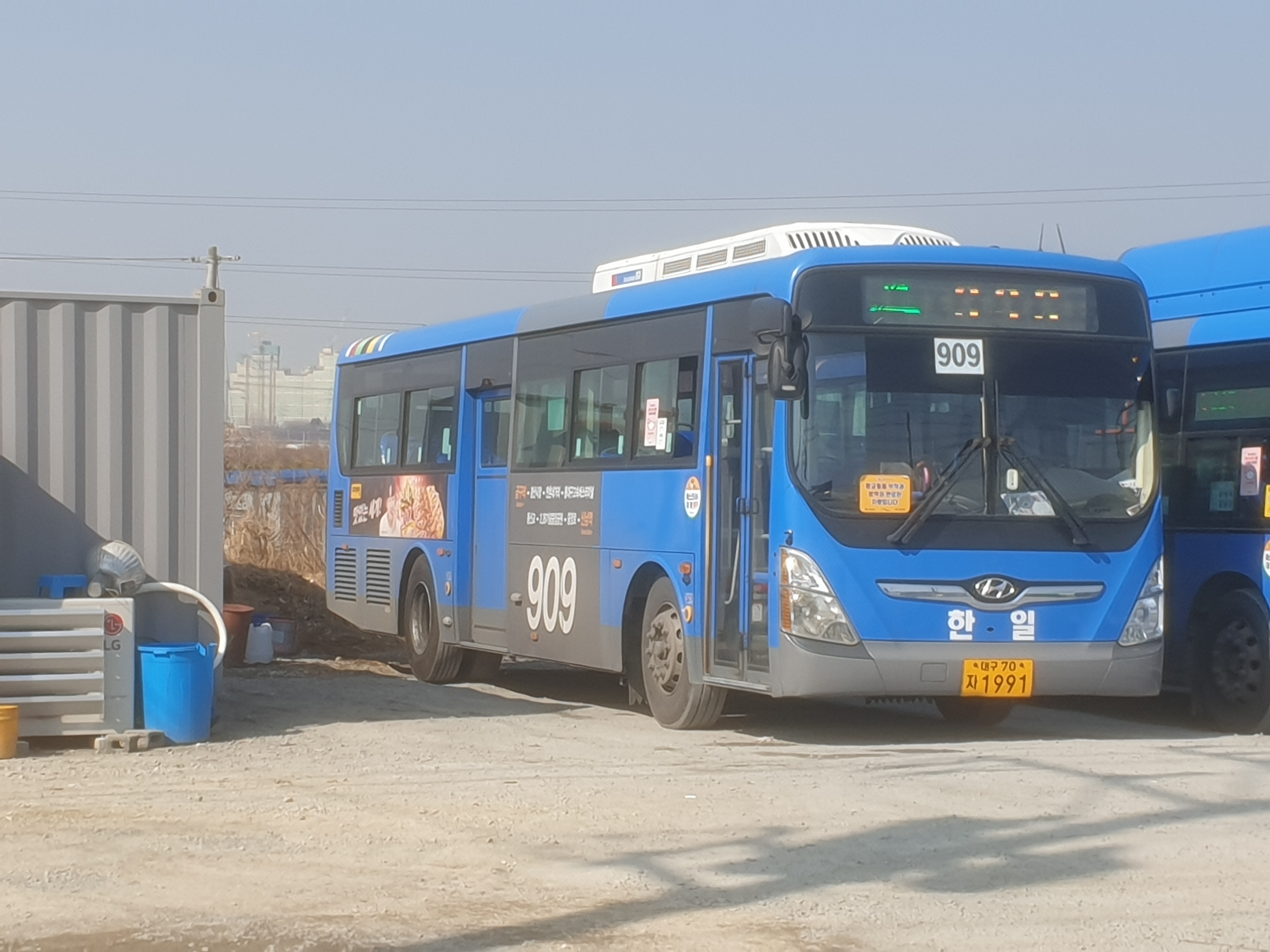
Hyundai New Super Aero City F/L CNG Bus From 2018-2024

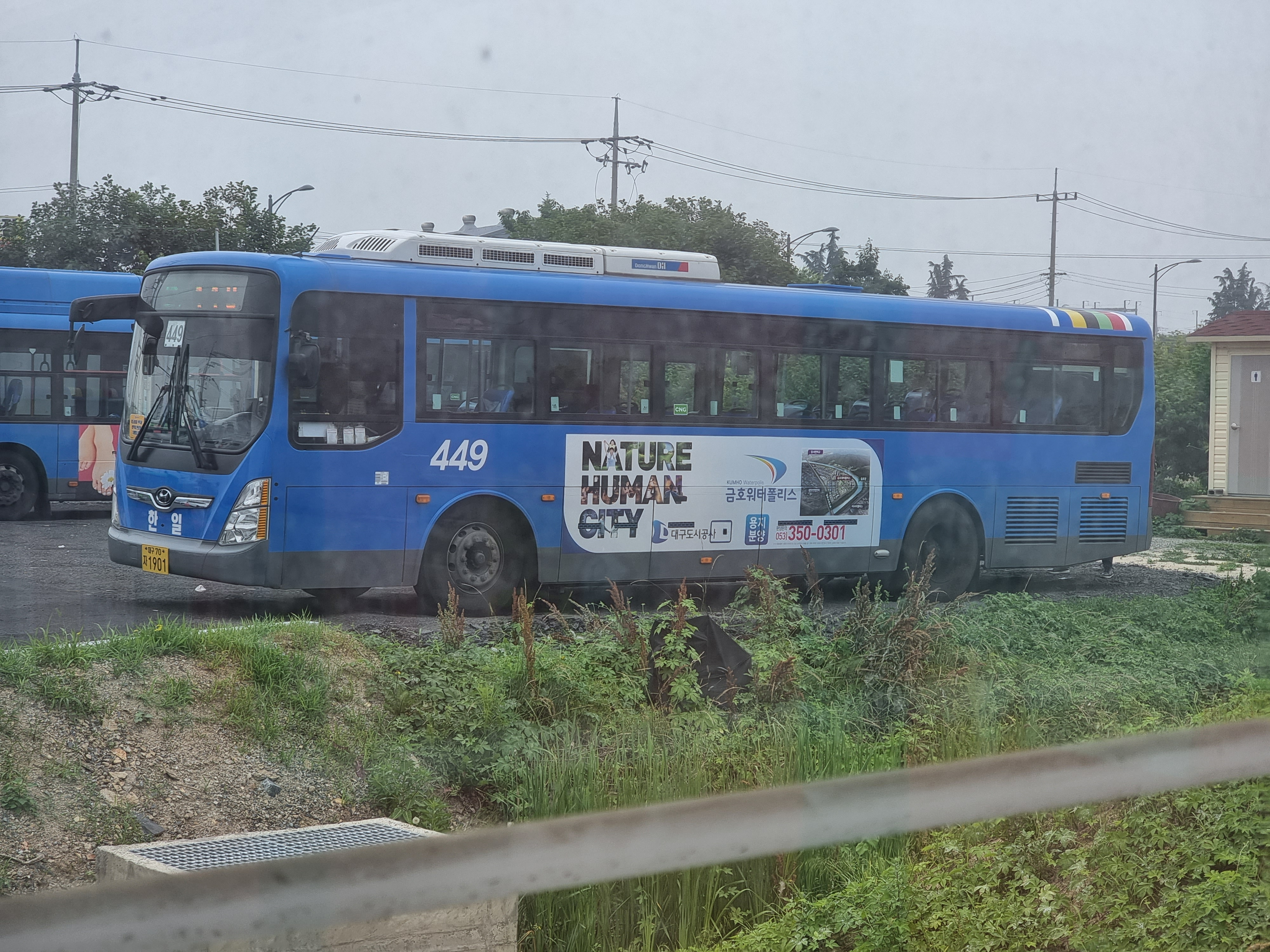
Hyundai New Super Aero City F/L CNG Bus 2018-2024

== New Super Aero City F/L Low Floor (July 2018–) ==
The Hyundai New Super Aero City F/L CNG Low Floor Bus Handicapped Allison or ZF entry, manufactured since July 2018.

With the implementation of mandatory low-floor buses from January 19, 2023, all Hyundai Motor Company urban high-floor buses, excluding low-floor buses, will be discontinued from January 2024, and the high-floor buses were completely abolished on the website on January 3 of that year.

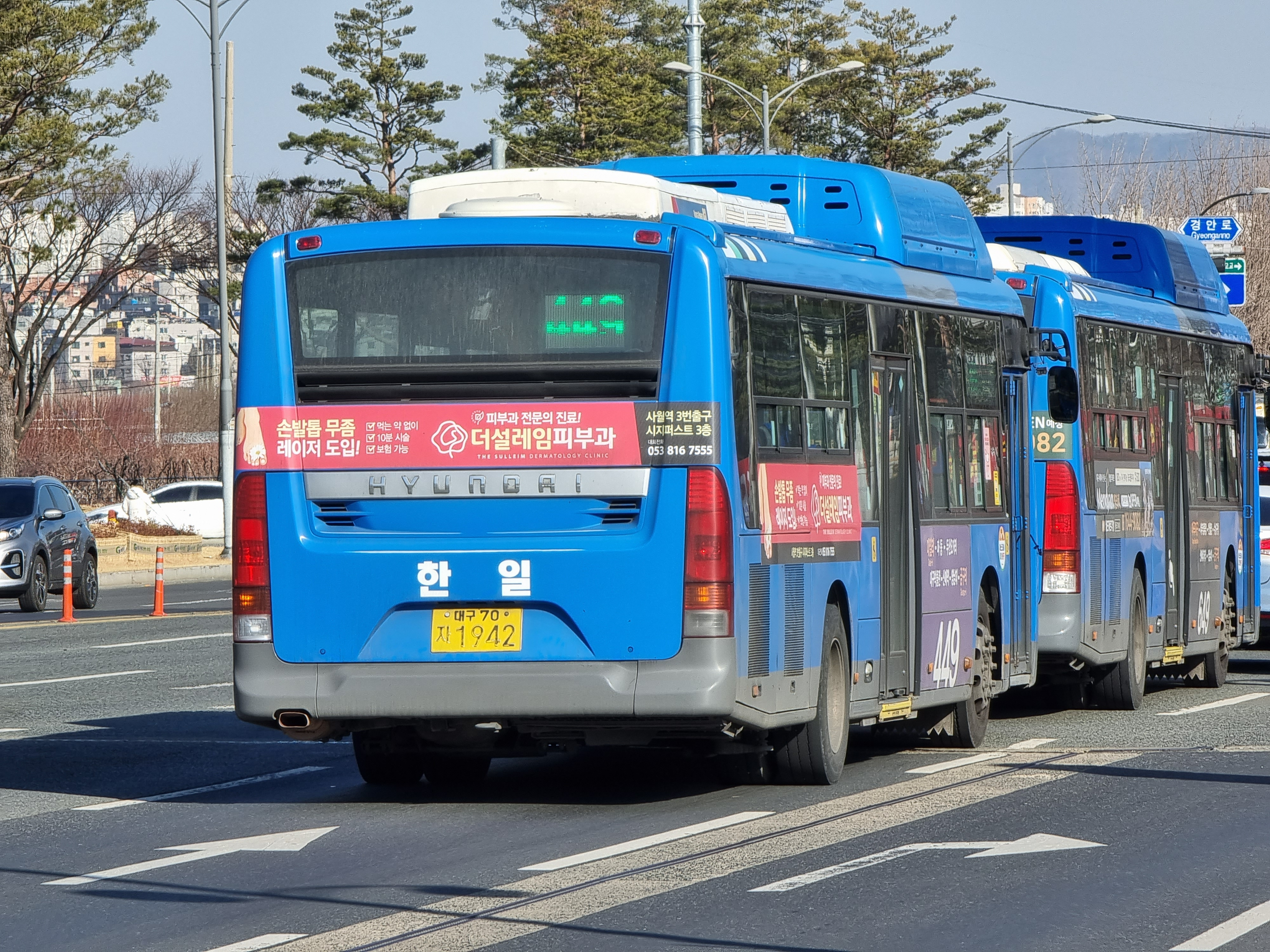
Hyundai New Super Aero City F/L Low Floor CNG Bus

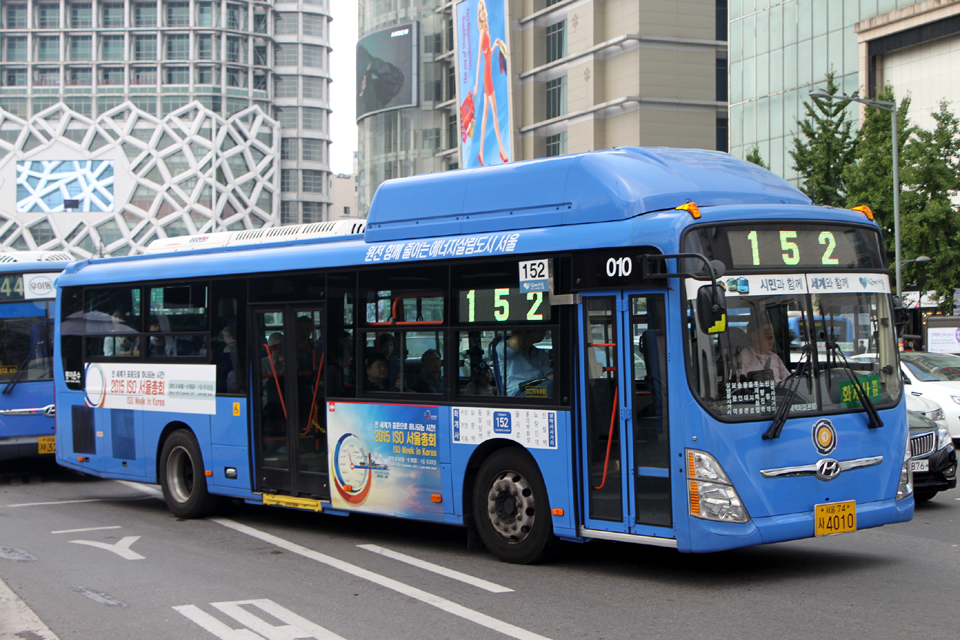
Hyundai New Super Aero City F/L Low Floor CNG Compressed Natural Gas Bus

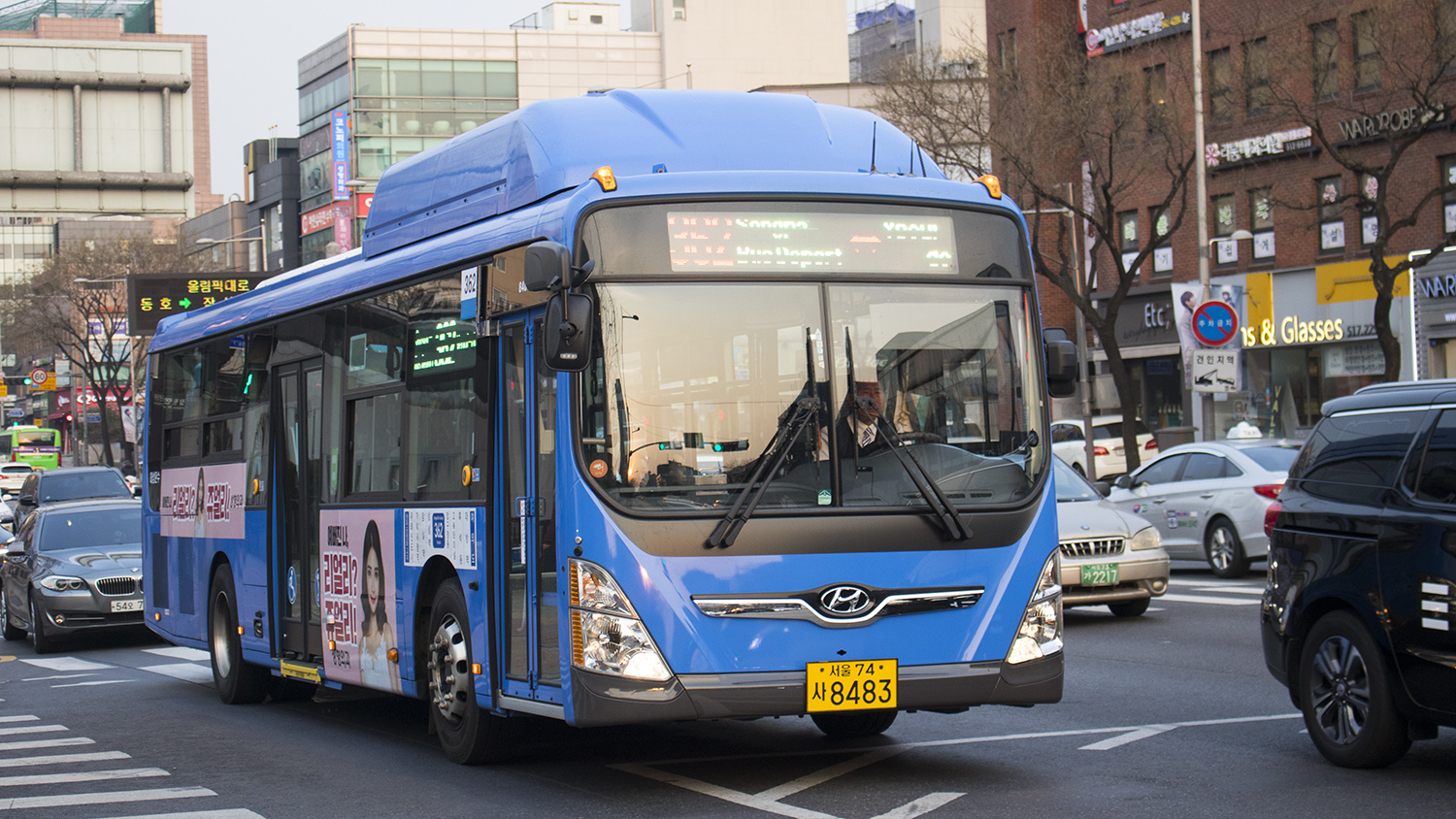
Hyundai New Super Aero City F/L Low Floor CNG 2018 Compressed Natural Gas Bus

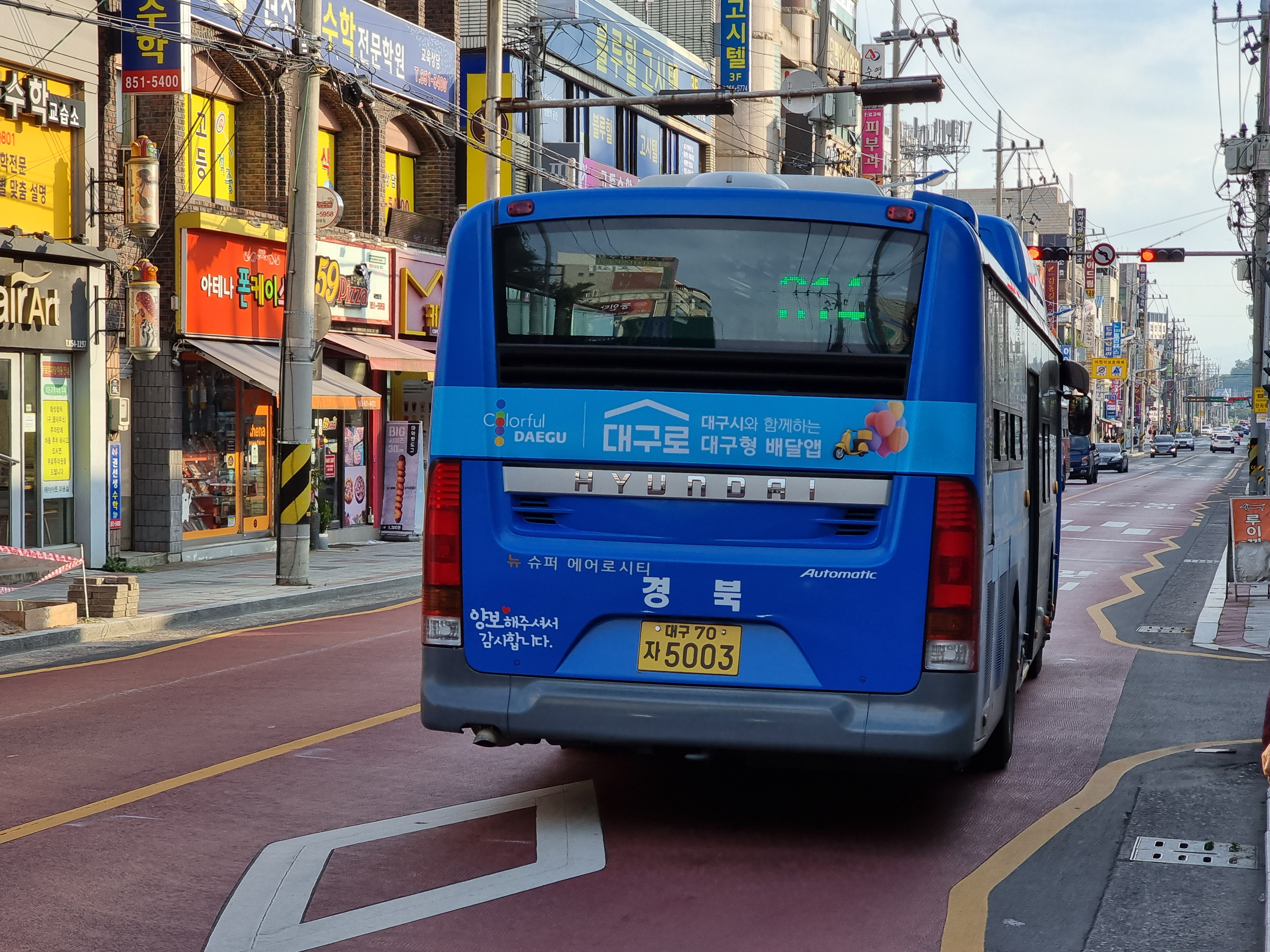
Hyundai New Super Aero City F/L Low Floor CNG 2018 Present Bus

== Models ==
The Aero City was built on the Mitsubishi Fuso bus chassis until 1994, when Hyundai created its own bus chassis. The Aero City has been produced under many different names.

=== Current models ===
- New Super Aero City F/L (restyled): manufactured since late 2007. Also available in L model.
- New Super Aero City low floor F/L (restyled): long wheelbase with handicapped entry, manufactured since 2008; uses Allison or ZF transmission.
- UniCity: a variant of the New Super Aero City F/L with coach elements. Manufactured since late 2011.
- Green City: a shorter variant of the New Super Aero City F/L.
- Elec City: Electric bus variant with Pure electric and Fuel Cell, in production since 2017.

=== Past models ===
- Aero City 520/540: built on the Mitsubishi Fuso Aero Star chassis from 1991 to 1994.
- Aero City 520/540/540L/540SL (new model): built on Hyundai's own chassis, manufactured from 1994 to 2001. Also available in L and SL models (L and SL models have a slightly lower decked floor).
- Super Aero City: manufactured from 2000 to 2004. Also available in L and SL models.
- Super Aero City low floor: long wheelbase with handicapped entry, manufactured in 2004; uses Allison or ZF transmission.
- New Super Aero City: manufactured from 2005 to 2007. Also available in L model.
- New Super Aero City low floor: long wheelbase with handicapped entry, manufactured from 2005 to 2008; uses Allison or ZF transmission.
- Green City: a shorter version of the Super Aero City and New Super Aero City.
- Blue City: Manufactured from 2011 to 2020. a CNG-electric hybrid variant of the New Super Aero City low floor F/L.

== See also ==
- Hyundai Motor Company
- Hyundai Aero
- Hyundai Global 900
- Hyundai RB
- Hyundai Elec City
- List of buses
