= Patent encumbrance of large automotive NiMH batteries =

Conspiracy theory

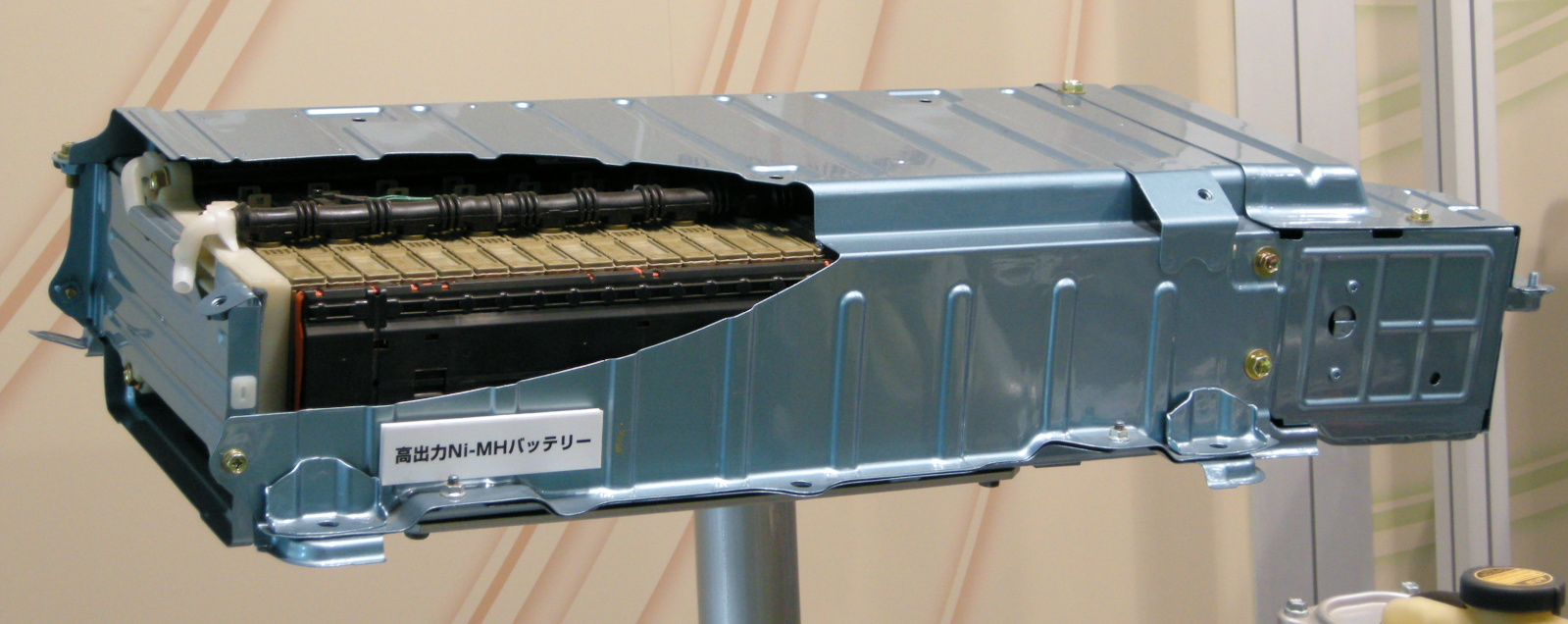
The high-power NiMH battery of a Toyota Prius

The patent encumbrance of large automotive NiMH batteries refers to allegations that corporate interests have used the patent system to prevent the commercialization of nickel metal hydride (NiMH) battery technology. Nickel metal hydride battery technology was considered important to the development of battery electric vehicles (BEVs or EVs), plug-in hybrid electric vehicles (PHEVs) and hybrid electric vehicles (HEVs) before the technology for lithium-ion battery packs became a viable replacement.

== Background ==
The modern nickel-metal hydride (NiMH) electric vehicle battery was invented by Dr. Masahiko Oshitani, of the GS Yuasa Corporation, and Stanford Ovshinsky, the founder of the Ovonics Battery Company, and granted a patent. The current trend in the industry is towards the development of lithium-ion (Li-Ion) technology to replace NiMH in electric vehicles. In 2009, Toyota tested lithium batteries as a potential replacement for the nickel metal hydride batteries used in its Prius model gasoline-electric hybrid. The company said that it would continue to use NiMH batteries in the Prius, but would introduce an all-electric vehicle based on lithium technology. Li-Ion technology, while functionally superior due to its higher specific energy and specific power, is more expensive and, as of 2009, relatively untested with regards to its long-term reliability. In 2007, the National Renewable Energy Laboratory said that Li-ion batteries may be subject to dangerous overheating and fire if cells are controlled incorrectly or damaged. In 2011, the National Highway Traffic Safety Administration investigated the safety of lithium battery powered vehicles and concluded that they pose no more risk of fire than other vehicles.

According to the United States Department of Energy the primary advantages of lithium batteries include their high power-to-weight ratio, high energy efficiency, good high temperature performance, and low tendency to spontaneously discharge when left unused for extended periods of time. Nickel metal hydride batteries have higher self-discharge, tend to generate heat at high temperatures, and have problems with hydrogen loss. However, none of these problems prevented the use of nickel metal hydride batteries in the Toyota Prius, which has an excellent reliability rating.

== Market feasibility in the 1990s ==
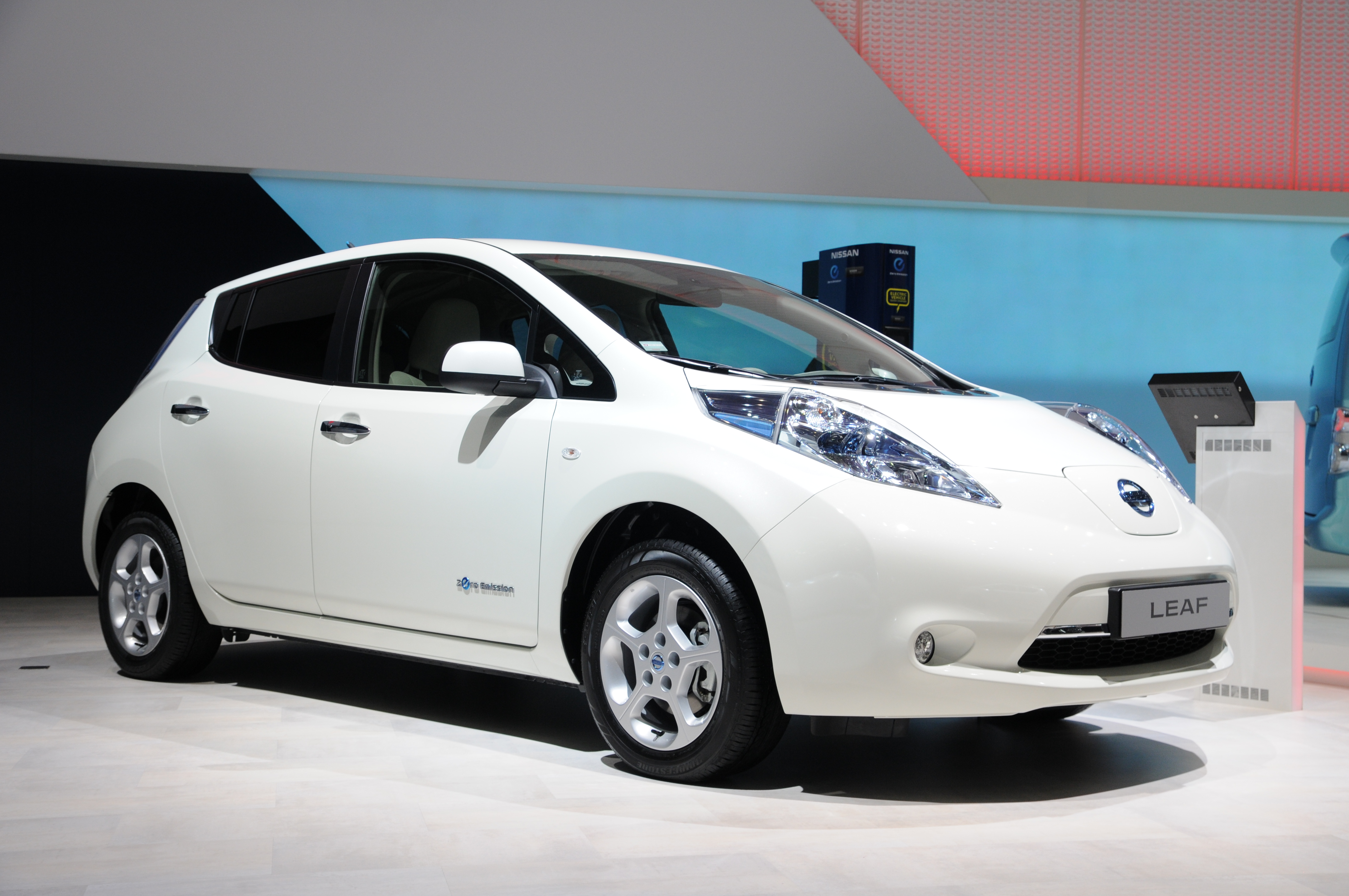
The 2011 Nissan Leaf had lower range and smaller battery capacity than the 1999 GM EV1. Nevertheless, it was a hit.

The 1999 GM EV1 production vehicle, powered by nickel metal hydride batteries, had a 26.4 kWh battery and an EPA range of 105 miles. (Note: This is the value recalculated by EPA according to later, stricter norms; the original 1999 rating was closer to 150 miles.)

The 2011 Nissan Leaf production vehicle had a 24 kWh battery and an EPA range of 84 miles.

Despite having not only a shorter range, but also a battery of smaller capacity than the 1999 GM EV1, the Leaf found 200,000 buyers worldwide before battery capacity was first increased in 2016.

Based on this, the claim that the NiMH technology was not sufficiently advanced in the 1990s seems false (at least with regard to two-seater cars that could more easily accommodate a battery of relatively large dimensions and weight).

== General Motors and the US Auto Battery Consortium ==
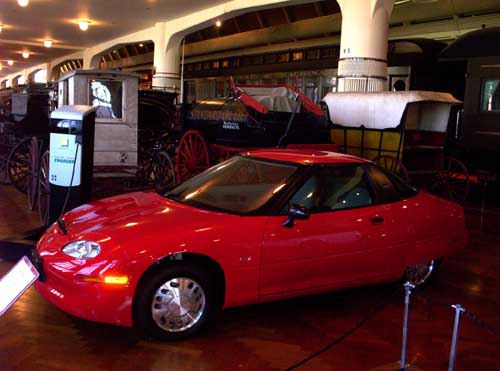
The Ovonics technology was acquired by General Motors for use in its EV1 electric car, but production was ended shortly after the NiMH batteries began to replace the lead-acid batteries of earlier models

In an interview in the 2006 documentary Who Killed the Electric Car?, Ovshinsky stated that in the early 1990s, the auto industry created the US Auto Battery Consortium (USABC) to stifle the development of electric vehicle technology by preventing the dissemination of knowledge about Ovshinky's battery-related patents to the public through the California Air Resources Board (CARB).

According to Ovshinsky, the auto industry falsely suggested that NiMH technology was not yet ready for widespread use in road cars. Members of the USABC, including General Motors, Ford, and Chrysler, threatened to take legal action against Ovshinsky if he continued to promote NiMH's potential for use in BEVs, and if he continued to lend test batteries to Solectria, a start-up electric vehicle maker that was not part of the USABC. The Big Three car companies argued that his behavior violated their exclusive rights to the battery technology, because they had matched a federal government grant given to Ovonics to develop NiMH technology. Critics argue that the Big Three were more interested in convincing CARB members that electric vehicles were not technologically and commercially viable.

In 1994, General Motors acquired a controlling interest in Ovonics's battery development and manufacture, including patents controlling the manufacture of large NiMH batteries. The original intent of the equity alliance was to develop NiMH batteries for GM's EV1 BEV. Sales of GM-Ovonics batteries were later taken over by GM manager and critic of CARB John Williams, leading Ovshinsky to wonder whether his decision to sell to GM had been naive. The EV1 program was shut down by GM before the new NiMH battery could be widely commercialized, despite field tests that indicated the Ovonics battery extended the EV1's range to over 150 miles.

Here, "field tests" mean actual use by customers, as these NiMH powered cars were in the hands of customers from 1999 until 2003, when GM took the cars from lessees (over their protests) and crushed them.

== Chevron and Cobasys ==
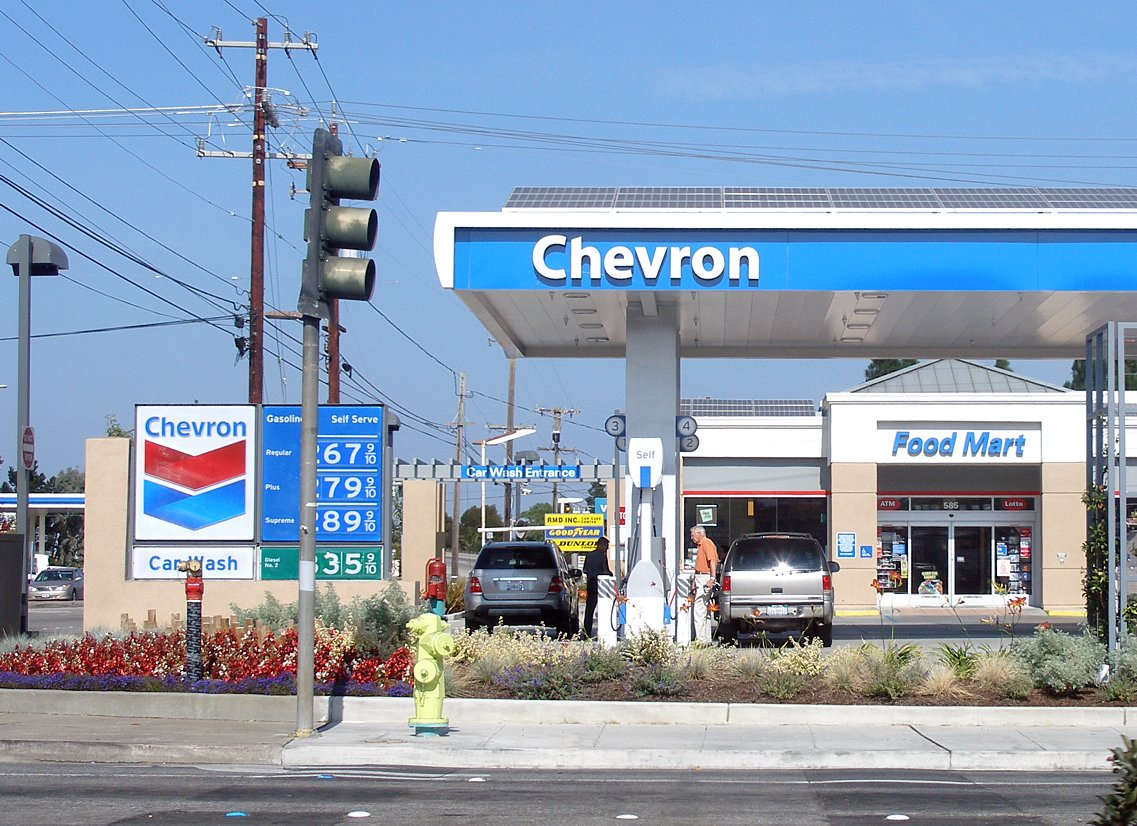
By 2001, the Ovonics technology was owned by the oil company Chevron.

In October 2000, oil company Texaco announced the purchase of General Motors' share in GM Ovonics. Texaco was itself acquired by rival Chevron, which was announced a few days later (and completed a year later).

At that time, Toyota was using NiMH batteries in the electric RAV4 SUV available in California. In March 2001, Chevron-controlled Ovonics filed a patent infringement suit against Toyota's battery supplier, Panasonic, as well as against Toyota itself, that led to a negotiated settlement in 2004. The agreement included extensive cross-licensing of each company's patents; a joint research venture to improve nickel hydride battery technology; and a ban on Panasonic's and Toyota's use of large format NiMH batteries for certain transportation uses until 2010. Information about what exactly were these particular transportation uses of NiMH batteries - that ChevronTexaco has forbidden - was suppressed due to a gag order placed on Toyota. This gag order was so effective that Panasonic did not Develop Size C and D Eneloop Batteries.

This way, ChevronTexaco forced Toyota to end production of the first generation Toyota RAV4 EV. However, the existing RAV4 EVs were not crushed. After the court granted a motion to stay proceedings (January 2002) and the ICC also agreed to hold its proceedings, Toyota allowed customers to buy their RAV4 EVs (March 2002 onwards), previously only available on a lease, even though it was not required by the California law to do so - and Toyota's obligations under the MOA with the California Air Resources Board's ZEV mandate were already fulfilled. Moreover, production and sales continued during the time the proceedings were halted, and sales ended only shortly (November 2002) before the parties entered into an arbitration agreement (December 2002), even though the last delivered vehicles had to be built with non-standard manufacturing techniques such as assembling a vehicle from spare parts (deliveries continued until September 2003). This shows obvious interest of at least some people in Toyota to keep the electric RAV4 alive.

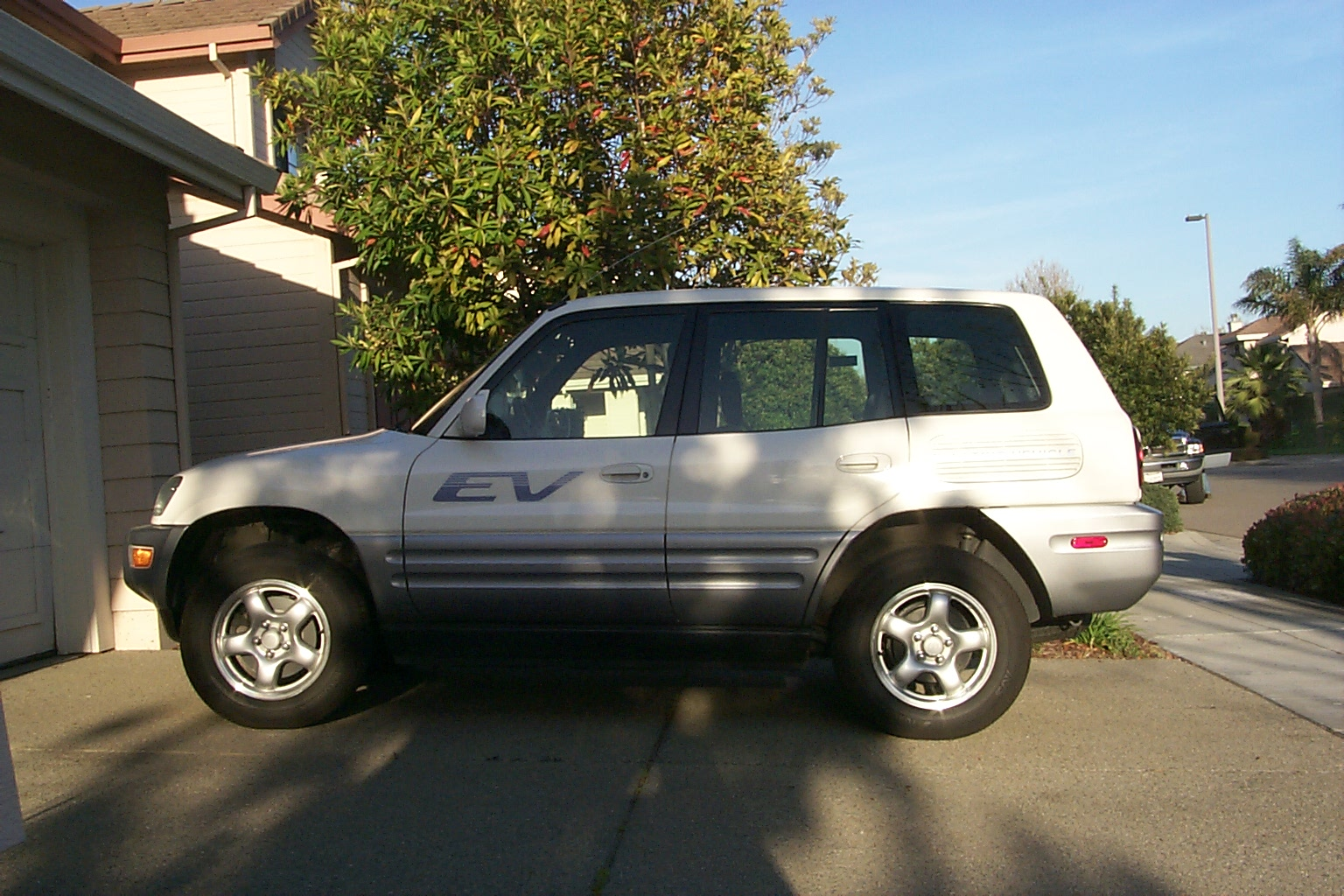
Chevron forced Toyota to stop the production of the RAV4 EV, and also prohibited sales of "commercial quantitites" of certain large automotive NiMH batteries until June 30, 2010.

After the forced discontinuation of the first-gen RAV4 EV and until Chevron-held patents expired, no new NiMH electric car was offered for sale or lease in the United States. Forced by Chevron to abandon plug-in vehicles, Toyota continued to use NiMH batteries in the non-plug-in Prius hybrid.

In 2003, Texaco Ovonics Battery Systems was restructured into Cobasys, a 50/50 joint venture between ChevronTexaco and Ovonics, now known as Energy Conversion Devices (ECD) Ovonics. Energy Conversion Devices announced that they had exercised an option to purchase back 4,376,633 shares of stock from a Chevron subsidiary, and would cancel and return them to authorized-unissued status. This is the exact number of shares that was listed as owned by ChevronTexaco in the January 15, 2003 filing.

ChevronTexaco also maintained veto power over any sale or licensing of NiMH technology. In addition, ChevronTexaco maintained the right to seize all of Cobasys' intellectual property rights in the event that ECD Ovonics did not fulfill its contractual obligations. On September 10, 2007, ChevronTexaco (now known as simply "Chevron") filed suit claiming that ECD Ovonics had not fulfilled its obligations. ECD Ovonics disputed this claim. The arbitration hearing has been repeatedly suspended while the parties negotiated with General Motors over the sale of Cobasys back to GM. As of March 2008, no agreement had been reached with GM.

In her 2007 book Plug-in Hybrids: The Cars that Will Recharge America, Sherry Boschert argues that large-format NiMH batteries (i.e., 25 amp-hours or more) are commercially viable but that Cobasys would only accept very large orders (more than 10,000) for these batteries. The effect is that this policy precludes small companies and individuals from buying them. It also precludes larger auto manufacturers from developing test fleets of new PHEV and EV designs. Toyota employees complained about the difficulty in getting smaller orders of large format NiMH batteries to service the existing 825 RAV4 EVs. Since no other companies were willing to make large orders, Cobasys was not manufacturing nor licensing any large format NiMH battery technology for automotive purposes. Boschert quotes Dave Goldstein, president of the Electric Vehicle Association of Washington D.C., as saying this policy is necessary because the cost of setting up a multimillion-dollar battery assembly line could not be justified without guaranteed orders of 100,000 batteries (~12,000 EVs) per year for 3 years. Boschert concludes that, "it's possible that Cobasys (Chevron) is squelching all access to large NiMH batteries through its control of patent licenses in order to remove a competitor to gasoline. Or it's possible that Cobasys simply wants the market for itself and is waiting for a major automaker to start producing plug-in hybrids or electric vehicles."

In an interview with The Economist, Ovshinsky subscribed to the former view. "I think we at ECD made a mistake of having a joint venture with an oil company, frankly speaking. And I think it's not a good idea to go into business with somebody whose strategies would put you out of business, rather than building the business." In the same interview, however, when asked, "So it’s your opinion that Cobasys is preventing other people from making it for that reason?", he responded, "Cobasys is not preventing anybody. Cobasys just needs an infusion of cash."

In October 2007, International Acquisitions Services, Inc. and Innovative Transportation Systems AG filed suit against Cobasys and its parents for refusing to fill a large, previously agreed-upon, order for large-format NiMH batteries to be used in the Innovan electric vehicle. In August 2008, Mercedes-Benz sued Cobasys for again refusing to fill a large, previously agreed-upon order for NiMH batteries.

== Timeline of legal status of the Ovonics battery technology ==
Multiple companies have tried to develop NiMH battery technology without making use of Ovonics' patents. Electro Energy Inc., working with CalCars, converted a Toyota Prius from a hybrid electric vehicle to a PHEV using its own bipolar NiMH batteries. Plug-In Conversions uses Nilar NiMH batteries and the EAA-PHEV open source control system in its Prius PHEV conversions. These organizations maintain that these developments are allowable because their NiMH battery technologies are not covered by Cobasys' patents. These batteries became commercially available in late 2007.

On July 28, 2009, Automotive News reported that Cobasys would be bought from Chevron and Energy Conversion Devices by battery maker SB LiMotive, a joint venture of Bosch and Samsung. At the time of the 2009 Cobasys sale, control of NiMH battery technology transferred back to ECD Ovonics. In October 2009, ECD Ovonics announced that their next-generation NiMH batteries will provide specific energy and power that are comparable to those of lithium-ion batteries at a cost that is significantly lower than the cost of lithium-ion batteries.

On February 3, 2010, patent JP2003504507 was refused, hence removing any patent encumbrance in Japan.

On July 2, 2010, patent US6413670, expired due to lack of fee payments for the 8th year from filing the patent, hence removing any patent encumbrance in the USA.

On February 14, 2012, BASF announced that it had acquired Ovonic Battery Company from Energy Conversion Devices Inc. But Chevron Corp. held the patent US6969567 for the NiMH multi-cell battery pack for cars until its expiration on August 23, 2018. This particular patent's maintenance fees for the 4th (2008) and 8th (2012) years were paid. As of December 2019 the status was "2019-12-04 Application status is Expired - Fee Related".
