= Cobasys =

Automotive technology corporation

Cobasys LLC is an American automotive technology corporation. It supplies nickel metal hydride (NiMH) batteries, battery control systems, and packaged solutions for automotive applications, uninterruptible power supplies, telecommunications applications, and distributed power generation. For 8 years ending in 2009, Cobasys was a 50-50 joint venture between California-based Chevron Corporation and Michigan-based Energy Conversion Devices, Inc. (also called ECD Ovonics, ECD, or Ovonics) The intermediary hierarchy of ownership was that Cobasys LLC was owned by Chevron's subsidiary Chevron Technology Ventures LLC, and ECD Ovonics' subsidiary Ovonic Battery Company. Cobasys spent $180 million in funding from Chevron Technology Ventures, and the two owners were unable to agree on further funding of the company. After arbitration between the owners had stalled, a buyer was found.

On July 14, 2009, the sale of Cobasys to SB LiMotive Co. Ltd., an electric vehicle battery joint venture between Samsung SDI Co. Ltd. and Robert Bosch GmbH, was announced. The joint venture ended in 2012, with Bosch taking full control of Cobasys.

== Battelle-Geneva's pioneering work on NiMH, 1967 ==
The pioneering work on NiMH batteries – essentially based on sintered Ti2Ni+TiNi+x alloys for the negative electrode and NiOOH-electrodes for the positives – was performed at the Battelle Geneva Research Center starting after its invention in 1967: The development work was sponsored over nearly two decades by Daimler-Benz Comp./Stuttgart and by Volkswagen AG. within the framework of Deutsche Automobilgesellschaft. The batteries showed high energy and power densities up to 50 Wh/kg, 1000 W/kg and a reasonable cycle life of 500 cycles. - Patent applications were filed in European countries (priority: Switzerland), USA and Japan and the patents transferred to Daimler-Benz Comp./Stuttgart. - Ref: Elektrode zur Speicherung und Aktivierung von Wasserstoff", K.D. Beccu, Battelle-Geneva, CH Priority Application No. 6333/67-Bb3/CH/2 - (2.05.1967), Patent: DE 2317505 C2 (18.10.73). Negative electrode of Ti-Ni alloy hydride phases, US patent US 3,669,745 (06/13,1972), inventor: K.D. Beccu, Ph.D., Battelle-Geneva R&D Center. See also NiMH batteries

The "invented NiMH variation" of Mr. Ovshinsky consisted in special alloys with disordered alloy structure and specific multicomponent alloy compositions. This variation made possible to increase the battery performance, i.e. the energy density, the cycle life and other characteristics.

== History ==
=== ECD Ovonics, 1960 ===
ECD Ovonics, half owner of Cobasys, was founded in 1960 by Stanford R. Ovshinsky, a scientist and inventor, with his wife and collaborator Iris M. Ovshinsky. Mr. Ovshinsky invented a variation on the NiMH battery, and ECD Ovonics holds crucial patents on some types of NiMH battery technology, licensing them to all major NiMH battery producers. Among its many activities, it produces consumer-oriented NiMH batteries, while Cobasys focuses on higher-energy industrial applications.

=== Ovonic Battery Company, 1982 ===
Ovonic Battery Company (OBC) was formed in 1982 as a joint venture between ECD Ovonics and Detroit, Michigan-based American Natural Resources Company (ANR) to capitalize on the rechargeable NiMH batteries which Mr. Ovshinsky had invented. ANR had invested $23 million before backing out of the venture in 1995, at which point ECD Ovonics purchased ANR for $8 million in stock and notes, leaving OBC as a wholly owned subsidiary of ECD Ovonics.

In the early 1980s OBC produced Ovonic NiMH batteries for the consumer market. Until that time, Nickel Cadmium (NiCad) batteries dominated the consumer rechargeable battery market, but NiMH batteries were safer, and stored more energy in an equivalent size. It also began work with Hyundai Motor Company and an unnamed Japanese automaker on batteries for electric vehicles (EVs). In 1992, OCB was awarded a contract by the United States Advanced Battery Consortium (USABC), a consortium of US automakers, to develop EV batteries, and in 1993, their first EV NiMH battery pack was used in the Chrysler TE van, which previously used Li-alloy/FeS batteries.

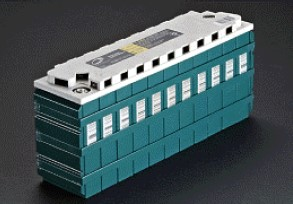
GM Ovonic NiMH battery module

=== GM Ovonic Battery, 1994 ===
In 1994, Ovonic Battery Company formed a joint venture with General Motors (GM), called GM Ovonic Battery, to manufacture NiMH batteries for electric vehicles. GM was given a 60% share of the venture, and provided operating capital, manufacturing capability, and management personnel, while OBC was given a 40% share, and provided patents, licenses, intellectual property, and engineering personnel. Robert Stempel, who in 1992 concluded a 37-year career at GM, finishing as chairman and CEO, joined ECD Ovonics as an advisor in 1993, and has served as ECD Ovonics' chairman since 1995.

This period was during the development of hybrid and electric vehicles by several automotive manufacturers trying to comply with California's Zero-Emission Vehicle (ZEV) Program, which required 2% of new vehicles sold or leased in the state to be ZEVs by the 1998 model year, and 10% by the 2003 model year. NiMH batteries were used in small production runs of EVs from Toyota, Honda, DaimlerChrysler, and Ford in 1997, and GM in 1999. In 1996, California pushed back its ZEV compliance requirement from 1998 to 2003, and required the sale of just 3,750 ZEVs between 1998 and 2001.

=== Texaco Ovonic Battery Systems, and Cobasys, 2000 ===
In October 2000, Texaco Inc. announced it will buy GM's 60% share in GM Ovonics Battery Systems, adding to their existing 20% share in the company, and restructure the joint venture as a 50-50 partnership with ECD Ovonics, renamed Texaco Ovonic Battery Systems LLC. Less than a week later, Texaco and Chevron Corporation announced a merger plan, which was completed a year later as they became ChevronTexaco Corporation.

In 2004 this joint venture was renamed Cobasys LLC.

In addition to holding a 50% share of Cobasys, Chevron holds a 19.99% interest in ECD Ovonics. Chevron maintains veto power over any sale or licensing of Cobasys' NiMH technology. In addition, Chevron maintains the right to seize all of Cobasys' intellectual property rights in the event that ECD Ovonics does not fulfill its contractual obligations. On September 10, 2007, Chevron filed a legal claim that ECD Ovonics has not fulfilled its obligations. ECD Ovonics disputes this claim.

Two other 50/50 joint ventures between Texaco and EVD Ovonics were created shortly before and after Texaco's acquisition of GM's shares in what became Cobasys. One focused on regenerative fuel cell technology, the other on metal hydride hydrogen technology.

==== Texaco Ovonic Fuel Cell Company, LLC ====
In September 2000, Texaco Ovonic Fuel Cell Company, LLC was formed as a 50/50 joint venture between ECD Ovonics and Texaco Energy Systems, Inc. to develop and market Ovonic regenerative fuel cell technology. It was later renamed ChevronTexaco Ovonic Fuel Cell Company. In June 2003, ECD acquired Texaco Energy Systems' share for $1.00, effective December 31, 2002, and 100% ownership was assumed by ECD. The name was changed to Ovonic Fuel Cell Company LLC.

==== Texaco Ovonic Hydrogen Systems, LLC ====
In October 2000, Texaco Ovonic Hydrogen Systems, LLC was formed as a 50/50 joint venture between ECD Ovonics and Texaco Energy Systems, Inc. to develop and market ECD's metal hydride hydrogen technology. It was later renamed ChevronTexaco Ovonic Hydrogen Systems. In December 2004, ChevronTexaco's share in the venture was traded to ECD Ovonic in a deal that granted Cobasys an expansion of their NiMH battery technology licenses given by ECD Ovonics. The now wholly owned subsidiary of ECD Ovonics was renamed Ovonic Hydrogen Systems LLC.

=== Patent dispute with Panasonic EV Energy ===
Panasonic EV Energy (PEVE), a joint venture between Matsushita and Toyota begun in 1996, pioneered several advances in large-format NiMH batteries suitable for electric vehicles.

PEVE supplied higher-capacity (28–95 Ah) NiMH batteries for use in Toyota, Honda, and Ford battery electric vehicles (BEVs) that began production in 1997. PEVE's lower capacity batteries powered the hybrid electric vehicle (HEV) Toyota Prius, which was introduced in Japan in 1997, and sold 18,000 units in its first year of production, as well as the first Honda Insight and, with Sanyo Electric Co, first generation Civic hybrid models. BEV production by major automakers ceased in the early 2000s, with most leased BEV vehicles crushed by their manufacturers, and replacement batteries unavailable for remaining vehicles.

A 2001 patent infringement lawsuit brought by ECD Ovonics and Ovonic Battery Company, Inc. against Matsushita, Toyota, and PEVE was settled in July 2004. Settlement terms called for cross-licensing between parties of current and future NiMH-related patents filed through December 31, 2014. The terms prevented Matushita, Toyota, and PEVE from selling certain NiMH batteries for transportation applications in North America until the second half of 2007, and commercial quantities of certain NiMH batteries in North America until the second half of 2010. Additionally, Ovonic Battery Co. and ECD Ovonics received a $10 million patent license fee, Cobasys received a $20 million patent license fee, $16 million of which was earmarked to reimburse legal expenses, and Cobasys would receive royalties on certain batteries sold by Matushita/PEVE in North America.

Licensing terms were expanded in 2005, with PEVE granted further license to sell NiMH batteries for certain transportation applications in North America, in exchange for royalties paid to Cobasys through 2014.

=== Sale and dissolution ===
According to SEC filings, ECD Ovonics and Cobasys hold 125 US patents related to NiMH battery technology. 13 of the patents, considered particularly important, were due to expire by 2014.

Cobasys and A123Systems announced a partnership in 2007 to develop, manufacture, sell and service lithium-ion batteries for automotive applications. A123Systems will provide their proprietary nanophosphate lithium ion technology and manufacture the batteries, while Cobasys will act as the tier one supplier to the automotive industry, providing extensive development and integration services.

Cobasys was contracted to provide NiMH battery systems for the GM's Saturn Vue Green Line SUV, GM's Saturn Aura Green Line sedan, and GM's Chevrolet Malibu Hybrid Sedan. In 2009, GM discontinued the Saturn brand, ending the contract.

In March, 2007, Cobasys announced that they were exploring strategic alternatives to growth, engaging the services of financial advisors from UBS Investment Bank and Goldman, Sachs & Co.

On July 14, 2009, the sale of Cobasys to SB LiMotive Co. Ltd., an electric vehicle battery joint venture between Samsung SDI Co. Ltd. and Robert Bosch GmbH, was announced. This joint venture was terminated in 2012, with Cobasys being folded into Bosch, with joint access of the partners to the 3000 or so patents held by it.

On February 14, 2012, the former Energy Conversion Devices Inc. operating subsidiary "Ovonic Battery Company" was acquired by BASF Corporation of Germany.

== Criticisms ==
Large-format NiMH batteries may have been commercially viable and ready for mass production, but there have been claims that Chevron and other oil-related interests may have suppressed the technology. Presumably to forestall the introduction of battery electric vehicles and plug-in hybrids.

On October 10, 2000, Texaco announced the purchase of GM's share in GM Ovonics, and Chevron announced its acquisition of Texaco six days later. In 2003, Texaco Ovonics Battery Systems was restructured into Cobasys, a 50/50 joint venture between Chevron and Energy Conversion Devices (ECD) Ovonics. Chevron's influence over Cobasys extended beyond a strict 50/50 joint venture, holding a 19.99% interest in ECD Ovonics. In addition, Chevron maintained the right to seize all of Cobasys' intellectual property rights in the event that ECD Ovonics did not fulfill its contractual obligations. On September 10, 2007, Chevron filed a legal claim that ECD Ovonics had not fulfilled its obligations. ECD Ovonics disputed this claim. Since that time, the arbitration hearings were repeatedly suspended while the parties negotiated with an unknown prospective buyer. No agreement was reached with the potential buyer. Cobasys's patents relating to NiMH batteries expired in 2015.

In her book, Plug-in Hybrids: The Cars that Will Recharge America, published in February 2007, Sherry Boschert argues that large-format NiMH batteries are commercially viable but that Cobasys refuses to sell or license them to small companies or individuals. Boschert concludes that "it's possible that Cobasys (Chevron) is squelching all access to large NiMH batteries through its control of patent licenses in order to remove a competitor to gasoline. Or it's possible that Cobasys simply wants the market for itself and is waiting for a major automaker to start producing plug-in hybrids or electric vehicles."

In an interview with The Economist, Stan Ovshinsky stated, "I think we at ECD we made a mistake of having a joint venture with an oil company, frankly speaking. And I think it’s not a good idea to go into business with somebody whose strategies would put you out of business, rather than building the business." In a later interview, however, when asked, "So it's your opinion that Cobasys is preventing other people from making it for that reason?", he responded "Cobasys is not preventing anybody. Cobasys just needs an infusion of cash.". Cobasys CEO Tom Neslage refuted the financial criticisms, saying that Cobasys had been continuously funded since its 2001 founding, and Chevron's funding had totaled more than $350 million.

In October 2007, International Acquisitions Services, Inc. and Innovative Transportation Systems AG filed suit against Cobasys and its parents for refusing to fill a large, previously agreed-upon order for large-format NiMH batteries to be used in the electric Innovan.
