= David Adler (physicist) =

American physicist and MIT professor

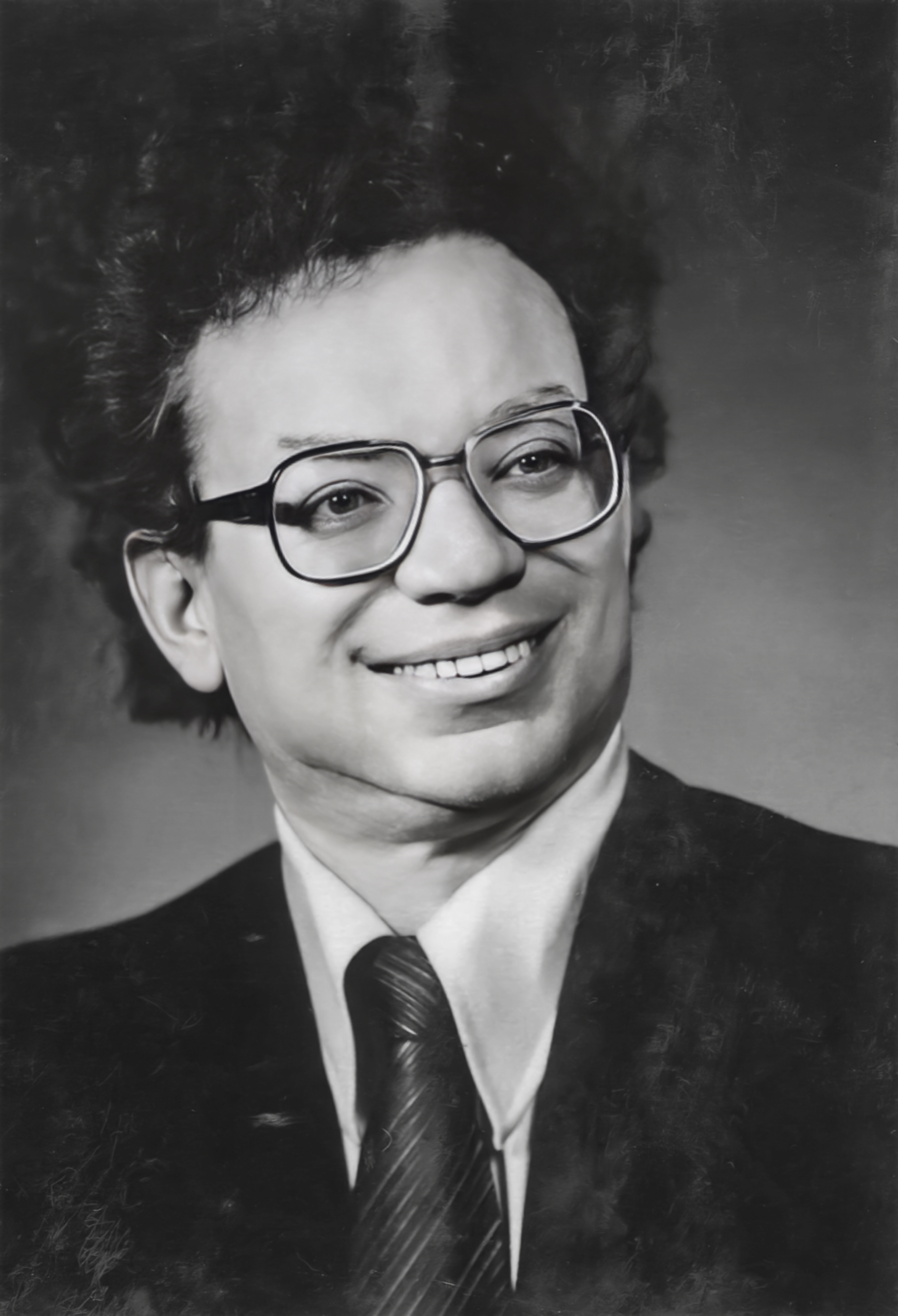
- Born: April 13, 1935; Bronx, New York
- Died: March 31, 1987 (aged 51); Lexington, Massachusetts
- Education: RPI, Harvard
- Scientific career
- Fields: Condensed matter physics
- Institutions: MIT, Atomic Energy Research Establishment
- Doctoral advisor: Harvey Brooks

David Adler (April 13, 1935 – March 31, 1987) was an American physicist and Massachusetts Institute of Technology professor. In condensed matter physics, Adler made significant contributions to the understanding of transition-metal oxides, the electronic properties of low-mobility materials, transport phenomena in amorphous materials, metal-insulator transitions, and electronic defects in amorphous semiconductors.

== Life and work ==
In particular, Adler was an expert on amorphous semiconductors, glassy substances that lack the precise atomic structure of semiconductor crystals. As a collaborator with Stanford Ovshinsky and other physicists at Energy Conversion Devices, Inc., where Adler consulted, he published work on solar photovoltaic energy conversion, and threshold switching and memory devices. He was also renowned for the “originality and clarity” of his review.

Adler was born in the Bronx to Russian immigrant parents and attended the Bronx High School of Science. He then received his B.S. from Rensselaer Polytechnic Institute (RPI) in 1956 and his doctorate in physics from Harvard University in 1964. At Harvard, Adler started a dissertation on quantum field theory advised by Julian Schwinger at a time when Prof. Schwinger was revolutionizing theoretical physics. But Schwinger, who has been criticized for ignoring his graduate students, lost Adler’s thesis draft, and Adler changed his research direction, completing his Ph.D. on the theory of semiconductor-to-metal transitions with Harvey Brooks.

Next, Adler worked for a year as a research associate at the Atomic Energy Research Establishment (AERE) in Harwell, United Kingdom. He then became a research associate at the Massachusetts Institute of Technology (MIT) in 1965, advancing to full professor in the department of electrical engineering and computer science in 1975. During his relatively short career, Adler published almost 300 papers in technical journals and presented over 80 invited papers at scientific meetings throughout the world.

Adler played a key role in the development and operation of MIT’s Concourse, a small, interdisciplinary program of studies for undergraduates. Since Adler was “regarded as one of his department’s most outstanding teachers of undergraduates” and headed up its undergraduate thesis program, MIT established in his honor the yearly David Adler Memorial Thesis Prize for Outstanding Undergraduate Thesis. This honor has since been reconfigured as the David Adler Memorial Thesis Prize for Outstanding Master's of Engineering in Electrical Engineering Thesis.

Adler was a Fellow of the American Physical Society, which also created an annual award in his honor, the David Adler Lectureship Award in the Field of Materials Physics. He served as a regional editor of the Journal of Non-Crystalline Solids, an associate editor of Materials Research Bulletin, and an editorial board member of the publication Semiconductors & Insulators.

Adler was also well known in the physics community for his love and knowledge of fine food and world travel. Adler was married to biochemist Alice J. Adler (1935-2026) for 29 years, until his death.

== Selected publications ==
- Baryam Y., Adler D., & Joannopoulos J., “Structure and Electronic States in Disordered Systems,” PHYSICAL REVIEW LETTERS, Vol. 57, No. 4 (1986), pp. 467–70.
- U.S. Patent No. 4,379,943 (Apr. 12, 1983).
- Adler D., Shur M., Silver M., et al., “Threshold Switching in Chalcogenide-Glass Thin Films,” JOURNAL OF APPLIED PHYSICS, Vol. 51, No. 6 (1980), pp. 3289–309.
- Adler D., Henisch H., & Mott N., “Mechanism of Threshold Switching in Amorphous Alloys,” REVIEWS OF MODERN PHYSICS, Vol. 50, No. 2 (1978), pp. 209–20.
- Ovshinsky S. & Adler D., “Local Structure, Bonding, and Electronic Properties of Covalent Amorphous Semiconductors,” CONTEMPORARY PHYSICS, Vol. 19, No. 2 (1978), pp. 109–26.
- Adler D. & Yoffa E., “Electronic Structure of Amorphous Semiconductors,” PHYSICAL REVIEW LETTERS, Vol. 36, No. 20 (1976), pp. 1197–1200.
- Kastner M., Adler D., & Fritzsche H., “Valence-Alternation Model for Localized Gap States in Lone-Pair Semiconductors,” PHYSICAL REVIEW LETTERS, Vol. 37, No. 22 (1976), pp. 1504–7.
- Adler D., “Mechanisms for Metal-Nonmetal Transitions in Transition Metal Oxides and Sulfides,” REVIEWS OF MODERN PHYSICS, Vol. 40, No. 4 (1968), p. 714 ff.
- Adler D. & Brooks, H., “Theory of Semiconductor-To-Metal Transitions,” PHYSICAL REVIEW, Vol. 155, No. 3 (1967), p. 826 ff.
