= Iris M. Ovshinsky =

American businesswoman and scientist

- Born: July 13, 1927; New York City
- Died: August 16, 2006 (aged 79); Bloomfield Township, Oakland County, Michigan
- Education: Bachelor's degree, zoology, Swarthmore College, 1947; master's degree, biology, University of Michigan, 1950; doctorate, biochemistry, from Boston University, 1960
- Spouses: Andrew Dibner, Stanford R. Ovshinsky

Iris M. Ovshinsky (July 13, 1927 – August 16, 2006) was an American businesswoman and scientist, and the co-founder of Energy Conversion Devices with her husband Stanford R. Ovshinsky, serving as its Vice President from its founding in 1960 until her death.

Born Iris L. Miroy in New York City, she earned a bachelor's degree in zoology from Swarthmore College in 1947, a master's degree in biology from the University of Michigan in 1950, and doctorate in biochemistry in 1960 from Boston University.

She was first married to Andrew Dibner, with whom she had a son, Steven, and a daughter, Robin. Following her 1959 divorce from Dibner, she married Ovshinsky in 1962; the marriage brought her three stepsons, Ben, Harvey, and Dale. Mr. Ovshinsky was a prolific inventor, credited with inventing the nickel metal hydride battery, and amorphous materials used in a variety of products from flexible solar panels to rewritable CDs and DVDs. Disagreeing with his wife's downplaying of her contributions throughout their careers, Stan said she was a partner in everything they did, "a colleague and collaborator in my scientific activity. She's just too damn modest."

Ovshinsky briefly appears in Who Killed the Electric Car? the documentary film which explores the creation, limited commercialization, and subsequent destruction of the battery electric vehicle in the United States, specifically the General Motors EV1 of the 1990s.

Ovshinsky died on August 16, 2006, aged 79, having suffered a myocardial infarction while swimming near her home in Bloomfield Township, Oakland County, Michigan.
