= Hellmut Fritzsche =

American physicist

- Born: 20 February 1927; Berlin, Germany
- Died: 17 June 2018 (aged 91); Tucson, Arizona
- Education: Purdue University
- Scientific career
- Fields: Physics
- Workplaces: University of Chicago
- Doctoral advisor: Karl Lark-Horovitz

Hellmut Fritzsche (20 February 1927 – 17 June 2018) was a German-born American physicist.

He came to the US on a one-year Smith-Mundt fellowship in 1950/51. After receiving his Diplom in physics from the University of Göttingen in 1952 he returned to the US. He earned his Ph.D. from Purdue University in 1954 where in the same year he became Instructor and in 1955 Assistant Professor. In 1957 he moved to the University of Chicago, where in 1963 he became a full professor and in 1996 retired. During this time he had children, Peter Fritzsche in 1959, Thomas Fritzsche in 1961, and Susanne Fritzsche in 1963, and later, Katja Fritzsche in 1970. During his career at the University of Chicago he was director of its Materials Research laboratory 1973–77 and chairman of its Physics department 1977–86. During his chairmanship he planned and oversaw the building of the Kersten Physics Teaching Center. For twenty five years Fritzsche served on the University of Chicago Advisory Committee for the Encyclopædia Britannica and during the last 7 years as its chairman. Fritzsche was a vice president and board member of Energy Conversion Devices, Inc. since 1969 and a member of the board of directors of United Solar Systems Corp. from 1993 to 2003. He had 3 grandchildren. Nina Fritzsche (b. 2006), Joshua Fritzsche (b. 2011) and Matteo Fritzsche (b. 2016)

== Research ==
Fritzsche trained 36 Ph.D. students. Some of the major accomplishments of his group were:

1. The discovery and exploration of a new conduction process in semiconductors at very low temperatures: impurity conduction, the hopping of charge carriers between the random distribution of impurity atoms.
2. The elucidation of the metal-insulator transition of semiconductors.
3. The use of neutron transmutation doping of some semiconductors: the transmutation of host atoms into doping atoms by the nuclear capture of thermal neutrons.
4. The first use of synchrotron radiation as a light source resulting in a study of far ultraviolet spectra of solids and their electronic structure.
5. The experimental and theoretical exploration of amorphous semiconductors discovered by Stanford R. Ovshinsky and their use in solid state electronic devices and solar panels.

== Honors ==
- Alexander von Humboldt Award 1985.
- Honorary professor and member of the Chinese Academy of Sciences, 1985.
- Honorary professor, Nanjing University 1986.
- Honorary professor, Beijing University of Aeronautics and Astronautics, 1988.
- Honorary Doctor of Science, Purdue University, 1988.
- Fulbright Scholarship, professor at Tbilisi State University, Georgia, USSR, 1988.
- Oliver E. Buckley Condensed Matter Prize, 1989.
- Louis Block Professor of Physics, The University of Chicago, 1989.
- Scott Lecturer, Cambridge University, GB, 1990.
- Fellow Commoner, Trinity College, Cambridge GB, 1992.
- Fulbright Scholarship, Foundation for Research and Technology- Hellas, Heraklion, Greece, 1992.
- Stanford R. Ovshinsky Prize for Excellence in Non-Crystalline Chalcogenides 2004

== Publications ==
Fritzsche published 280 papers in scientific journals and wrote or edited 13 books. He held 15 US patents.

== Selected writings by Fritzsche ==
- Editor: Amorphous Silicon and related materials, Parts A, B, World Scientific 1989
- Editor: Transport, correlation and structural defects, World Scientific 1990
- Editor with David Adler: Localization and metal-insulator transitions, Plenum Press 1985 (Vol. 3 a Festschrift for Nevill Francis Mott)
- Electronic phenomena in amorphous semiconductors, Annual Review of Material Science, Vol.2, 1972, pp. 697–744
- Editor with Brian Schwartz: Stanford R. Ovshinsky – the science and technology of an American genius, World Scientific 2008
