= Stanford R. Ovshinsky =

American engineer, scientist and inventor

Stanford Robert Ovshinsky
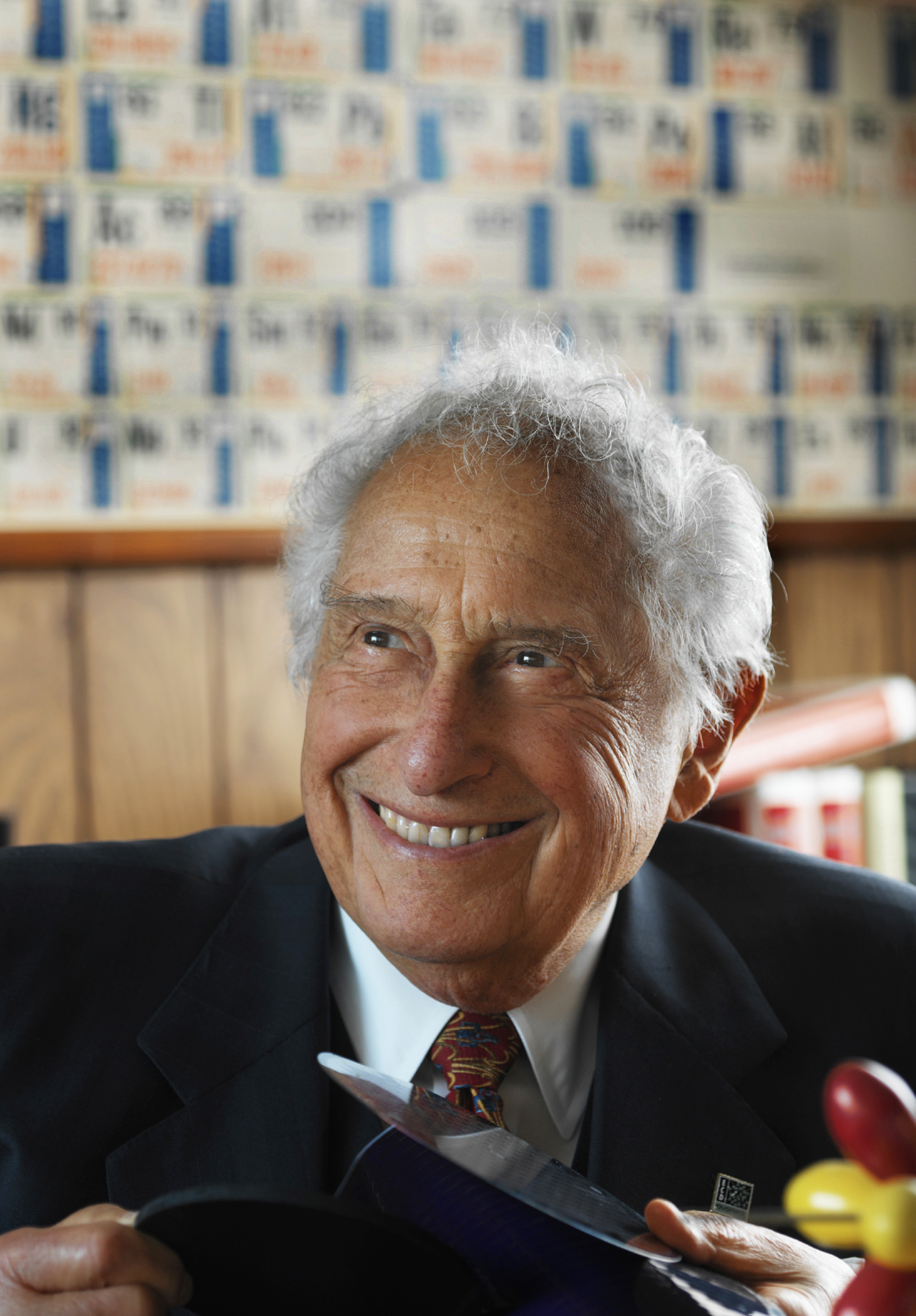
- Stanford R. Ovshinsky, August 2005
- Born: Stanford Robert Ovshinsky; November 24, 1922; Akron, Ohio, U.S.
- Died: October 17, 2012 (aged 89); Bloomfield Hills, Michigan, U.S.
- Occupations: engineer, scientist and Inventor
- Known for: Nickel–metal hydride battery Phase-change memory
- Spouses: Norma Rifkin (m. 1943; div. 1959); Iris M. Ovshinsky (m. 1960; died 2006); Rosa Young (m. 2007)

Stanford Robert Ovshinsky (November 24, 1922 – October 17, 2012) was an American engineer, scientist and inventor who over a span of fifty years was granted well over 400 patents, mostly in the areas of energy and information. Many of his inventions have had wide-ranging applications. Among the most prominent are: the nickel-metal hydride battery, which has been widely used in laptop computers, digital cameras, cell phones, and electric and hybrid cars; flexible thin-film solar energy laminates and panels; flat panel liquid crystal displays; rewritable CD and DVD discs; hydrogen fuel cells; and nonvolatile phase-change memory.

Ovshinsky opened the scientific field of amorphous and disordered materials in the course of his research in the 1940s and 50s in neurophysiology, neural disease, the nature of intelligence in mammals and machines, and cybernetics. Amorphous silicon semiconductors have become the basis of many technologies and industries. Ovshinsky is also distinguished in being self-taught, without formal college or graduate training.

== Early life ==
Ovshinsky was born and grew up in the industrial town of Akron, Ohio, then at the center of the American rubber industry. The elder son of working-class Lithuanian Jewish immigrant parents who left Eastern Europe around 1905—Benjamin Ovshinsky from Lithuania and Bertha Munitz from what is now Belarus—Ovshinsky became active in social activities at an early age during the Great Depression. His lifelong concern to better the lives of workers and minorities, as well as to advance culture and the interests of industry, derive largely from his father, who was a generous, liberal, and highly cultured activist. With his horse and wagon, and later his truck, Ben Ovshinsky made his living collecting scrap metal from factories and foundries. Based on his father's example, and on teachings offered by the Akron Workmen's Circle, an organization mainly of Jewish immigrants who believed in social justice, Stan Ovshinsky developed a deep commitment to social values, including labor rights, civil rights, and civil liberties.

== Work through the 1950s ==
=== Work as a machinist and the Benjamin Center Drive ===
Before graduating from high school in June 1941, Ovshinsky worked as a teacher, tool maker and machinist in various local shops affiliated with the rubber industry. During the Second World War, he and his bride, Norma Rifkin, moved to Arizona, where Ovshinsky worked for a time in the tool room of a Goodyear plant in Litchfield, not far from Phoenix. Returning to Akron shortly before the end of the war, Ovshinsky eventually established his own machine company, Stanford Roberts, initially in a barn. There he developed and patented his first invention, the Benjamin Center Drive, named after his father. This unique automatic high-speed center drive lathe had many important uses. After Ovshinsky sold his company to the New Britain Machine Company in Connecticut, it was used to help solve the national crisis of making artillery shells in large enough volume for wartime needs during the Korean War. Meanwhile, Ovshinsky continued to develop his growing interest in human and machine intelligence, avidly studying the research literature on neurophysiology, neurological disease, and cybernetics, corresponding briefly with Norbert Wiener.

=== Intelligent machines ===
In 1951, Ovshinsky accepted an offer to move to Detroit and work in the automotive industry as the director of research at the Hupp Motor Company. Continuing his work on intelligent machines, he invented electric power steering, but Hupp's president was opposed to completing the arrangements with General Motors to utilize the product. Not long after that, Stan and his younger brother Herb Ovshinsky, a talented mechanical engineer, established a small company called General Automation in a Detroit storefront. There, Stan continued his study of intelligent machines and embarked on early research and development of various energy and information technologies. At the same time, he began studying neurophysiology and neurological diseases. On the basis of his early writings about nerve impulses and the nature of intelligence, he was invited by Wayne Medical School in June 1955 to participate in pioneering experimental research on the mammalian cerebellum.

== The Ovitron ==
By the late 1950s, working at General Automation, Ovshinsky brought together these disparate studies in an invention. Crossing scientific disciplines that academics traditionally hold separate, including neurophysiology and cybernetics, Stan invented, and Herb Ovshinsky helped build, a mechanical model of a nerve cell – an amorphous thin-film switch they called the Ovitron. Stan patented the device and the brothers disclosed it publicly in 1959 in New York City. In an attempt to model the learning ability of nerve cells, which Stan recognized as deriving from the plasticity of the cell's membrane, he drew on his knowledge of surfaces and materials to fashion very thin layers of amorphous material, thus pioneering the use of nanostructures. He created these layers by combining elements, especially from the Group 16 elements under oxygen, known as chalcogenides, including sulphur, selenium, and tellurium. He would continue to work with chalcogenides in his inventions for decades to come.

== Work from 1960 ==
=== Energy Conversion Laboratory ===
On January 1, 1960, Ovshinsky and Iris Miroy Dibner, whom he married soon after his divorce from Norma Rifkin, founded Energy Conversion Laboratory to develop his inventions in the interest of solving societal problems, especially those they identified in the areas of information and energy (e.g. pollution and wars over oil). Iris had a BA in zoology from Swarthmore College, an MS in biology from the University of Michigan, and a PhD in biochemistry from Boston University. Continuing to work on his atomically designed chalcogenide materials, which Ovshinsky realized offer unique electronic physical mechanisms, he utilized chain structures, cross links, polymeric concepts, and divalent structural bonding with a huge number of unbonded lone pairs to achieve what is now referred to as the Ovshinsky Effect – "an effect that turns special types of glassy, thin films into semiconductors upon application of low voltage." Applying this effect, he built new types of electronic and optical switches, including his Ovonic Phase Change Memory and his Threshold Switch. The former would become the basis of his subsequent inventions of rewritable CDs and DVDs and other new computer technologies including his cognitive computer. The latter is used in phase change memory that is entering the consumer market in 2017. While others working in the crystalline field were building devices based on bulk materials, Ovshinsky's work in the 1960s and later continued to be based on thin films and nanostructures. Recognizing the significance of his results, Ovshinsky applied for a patent on June 21, 1961 and, in 1962, made his first licensing pact on phase-change memory.

=== Energy Conversion Devices ===
By the spring of 1963, the Ovshinskys had exhausted the savings with which they had initially funded ECL. Before seeking public funding, Stan wanted validation of the importance of his work from a well-recognized scientist. He telephoned Nobel Laureate John Bardeen, a co-inventor of the transistor and co-discoverer of the BCS theory of superconductivity. Bardeen immediately recognized the importance of Ovshinsky's work but his schedule did not permit him to visit ECL for five months. Stan replied, "We'll be broke by then." In his place, Bardeen sent Hellmut Fritzsche, a University of Chicago physicist. Fritzsche became very positive in his support of Ovshinsky's work and helped attract other scientists to the Ovshinsky laboratory. As Fritzsche and Brian Schwartz later wrote, "There is a mysterious quality in Ovshinsky's persona that attracts people into his sphere, builds life long friendships and awakens deep respect and devotion. Meeting him leaves each person with a deep impression of his superior intellect, his self confidence, his compassion to improve society combined with his certainty that his vision can be realized. His enthusiasm is contagious. In his presence, you feel how exciting it would be to join him in his endeavors." Among the many famous scientists who came regularly to ECL as friends or collaborators over the next years, were David Adler, Bardeen, Arthur Bienenstock, Morrel H. Cohen, Kenichi Fukui, William Lipscomb, Sir Nevill Mott, Linus Pauling, Isadore I. Rabi, Edward Teller, David Turnbull, Victor Weisskopf, and Robert R. Wilson. Some joined as consultants or as members of the Board of Directors. Meanwhile, the ECL community developed a uniquely productive, non-hierarchical, multicultural, international environment, reflecting Stan and Iris' social values. In 1964, Stan and Iris changed the laboratory's name to Energy Conversion Devices and moved the company to larger quarters in Troy, Michigan.

The company continued to develop electronic memory, batteries, and solar cells, reinvesting almost every penny of profit into the scientific study of a wide variety of problems, much of which later became the basis of lucrative industries, e.g., flat screen liquid crystal displays. In time, license fees to ECD began to grow, especially when amorphous silicon was used to make solar cells "by the mile," with an approach that originated from Ovshinsky's non-silver photographic film work. It led to the bold approach of using the first continuous web photovoltaic machine, designed and built under Stan's direction by Herb Ovshinsky and a small group in the machine division. Generations of machines later resulted in sufficient money to reach Ovshinsky's objective of building a 30 megawatt machine, rather than a 5 megawatt machine. Despite considerable skepticism toward the machine, it is now being cloned very successfully by ECD in new plants. ECD also saw profits from the nickel metal hydride batteries, which were important for a time in laptop computers and continue to be important in hybrid gas-electric automobiles.

=== Ovshinsky Innovation LLC ===
On August 16, 2006, Iris Ovshinsky, Stan's wife and partner of almost fifty years, died suddenly while swimming. A year later, Ovshinsky retired from ECD and launched a new company with Rosa Young, whom he later married. At Ovshinsky Innovation LLC, he continued his work on information and energy science, in strong relationships with colleagues and with industrial partners (for example, Ovonyx, which is developing phase-change semiconductor memory). Ovshinsky Innovation is currently focusing on a new kind of photovoltaic plant based on a new concept promising to lower the cost of photovoltaic energy sources below that of coal. This latter innovation would help realize his long-term goal over the last half-century to make fossil fuels obsolete while, at the same time, providing countless jobs in new industries.

ECD has been recognized as the company that "developed solar roofing shingles in the 1990s," and making "the best available flexible thin film in the world," in addition to being one of the first companies to work on building-integrated photovoltaics (BIPV) Because of his independent and radical contributions to science, he has been compared with Albert Einstein. Because of his many inventions in digital memory, solar energy, battery technology, optical media, and solid hydrogen storage, and his hundreds of basic scientific patents, he has often been compared with Thomas Edison. In the area of alternatives to fossil fuel, his pioneering work has caused many writers to refer to him as "the modern world's most important energy visionary."

=== General Motors and the US Auto Battery Consortium ===
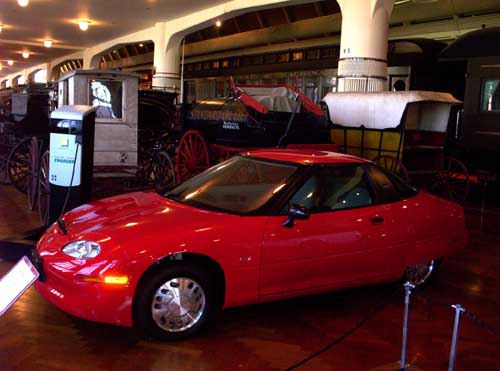
The Ovonics technology was acquired by General Motors for use in its EV1 electric car, but production was ended shortly after the NiMH batteries began to replace the lead-acid batteries of earlier models

In an interview in the 2006 documentary Who Killed the Electric Car?, Ovshinsky stated that in the early 1990s, the auto industry created the US Auto Battery Consortium (USABC) to stifle the development of electric vehicle technology by preventing the dissemination of knowledge about Ovshinsky's battery-related patents to the public through the California Air Resources Board (CARB).

According to Ovshinsky, the auto industry falsely suggested that NiMH technology was not yet ready for widespread use in road cars. Members of the USABC, including General Motors, Ford, and Chrysler, threatened to take legal action against Ovshinsky if he continued to promote NiMH's potential for use in BEVs, and if he continued to lend test batteries to Solectria, a start-up electric vehicle maker that was not part of the USABC. Critics argue that the Big Three were more interested in convincing CARB members that electric vehicles were not technologically and commercially viable.

In 1994, General Motors acquired a controlling interest in Ovonics's battery development and manufacture, including patents controlling the manufacture of large NiMH batteries. The original intent of the equity alliance was to develop NiMH batteries for GM's EV1 BEV. Sales of GM-Ovonics batteries were later taken over by GM manager and critic of CARB John Williams, leading Ovshinsky to wonder whether his decision to sell to GM had been naive. The EV1 program was shut down by GM before the new NiMH battery could be commercialized, despite field tests that indicated the Ovonics battery extended the EV1's range to over 150 miles.

== Death ==
His last public appearance was at Louis Riel School in Calgary, Alberta, Canada. Ovshinsky died of prostate cancer on October 17, 2012, aged 89 in Bloomfield Hills, Michigan.

== Honors and awards ==
With more than 300 publications on his curriculum vitae, Ovshinsky has won many prizes for his contributions to science and innovation.

=== Memberships and fellowships ===
- Fellow of the American Physical Society
- Fellow of the American Association for the Advancement of Science
- Fellow of the Engineering Society of Detroit
- Member of the Director's Council at the Michigan Center for Theoretical Physics, University of Michigan

=== Awards ===
- 2005 Innovation Award for Energy and the Environment by The Economist
- American Solar Energy Society Hoyt Clarke Hottel Award
- Karl W. Böer Solar Energy Medal of Merit
- International Association for Hydrogen Energy Sir William Grove Award
- 2007 Walston Chubb Award for Innovation, presented by Sigma Xi, the Research Society
- Frederick Douglass/Eugene V. Debs Award (2006)
- Engineering Society of Detroit Lifetime Achievement Award (2008)
- Environmental Hall of Fame 2008 Award, Solar Thin Film Category, Father of Thin-Film Solar Energy
- IEEE Vehicular Technology Society Presidential Citation in recognition of a long and outstanding record of pioneering accomplishments and service to the profession (2009)
- 2009 Thomas Midgley Award from the Detroit Section of the American Chemical Society
- Nominated as a finalist for the prestigious European Inventor Award 2012 by the European Patent Office for his development of NiMH batteries. The award was launched in 2006 as the first European prize to distinguish inventors who have made "an outstanding contribution to innovation, economy and society."
- Named "Hero for the Planet" by TIME magazine (1999), with Iris Ovshinsky Hero of Chemistry 2000 by the American Chemical Society
- Inducted into the 2005 Solar Hall of Fame
- Diesel Gold Medal presented by the German Inventors Association (Deutscher Erfinderverband), in recognition of his discovery of the semiconductor switching effect in disordered and amorphous materials (1968)
- Honorary Calgarian award at Louis Riel School in Calgary, Canada (May 24, 2012)
- Honorary Doctorate of Engineering degree from Kettering University, Flint, Michigan (December 11, 2010)
- Honorary Doctorate of Science degree from University of Michigan, Ann Arbor, Michigan (May 1, 2010)
- Honorary Doctorate in Science from Wayne State University, Detroit, Michigan (May 7, 2009)
- Honorary Doctorate of Engineering from Illinois Institute of Technology, Chicago, Illinois (May 16, 2009)
- Honorary Doctorate from Ovidius University, Constanţa, Romania (June 30, 2009)
- Honorary Doctorate of Science from New York Institute of Technology, Old Westbury, New York (May 18, 2008).
- Honorary Doctorate of Science from Kean University, Union, New Jersey (May 8, 2007)
- In 2015, Ovshinsky was inducted into the National Inventors Hall of Fame.

== In popular culture ==
Ovshinsky appeared in the documentary Who Killed the Electric Car?, as well as in parts 1 and 3 of the episode "Hydrogen Hopes" of Alan Alda's television series Scientific American Frontiers. The website of Scientific American Frontiers makes "Hydrogen Hopes" available for viewing at no charge, as well as the text of an interview with Stan and Iris Ovshinsky. Ovshinsky was profiled as "Japan's American Genius" in the PBS series NOVA (October 1987).

== See also ==
- Harold McMaster
- General Motors EV1
- Patent encumbrance of large automotive NiMH batteries

== Bibliography ==
- Hoddeson, Lillian, and Peter Garrett. The Man Who Saw Tomorrow: The Life and Inventions of Stanford R. Ovshinsky. Cambridge: MIT Press, 2018.
- Henderson, Tom. Crain's Detroit Business, "Quest for 'holy grail' of solar drives Ovshinsky" January 2–8, 2012, vol. 28, no. 1.
- Sigma Xi 125th Anniversary Interview. "Stanford R. Ovshinsky (1990)," interviewed by Greg P. Smestad.
- Bulletin of the Atomic Scientists. "Stanford Ovshinsky: Pursuing solar electricity at a cost equal to or lower than that of coal electricity", May 2011 vol. 67 no. 3 1-7
- Fisher, Lawrence M. "Stan Ovshinsky's Solar Revolution" strategy+business, Spring 2011: 62–71.
- Herbert, Bob. "Signs of Hope" The New York Times Magazine, November 24, 2009.
- Carson, Iain and Vijay Vaitheeswaran. Zoom: The Global Race to Fuel the Car of the Future. Hachette, New York: Twelve, 2007.
- Cohn, Avery. "A Revolution Fueled by the Sun" Berkeley Review of Latin American Studies (Spring 2008): 22–24.
- "The Edison of our Age?" The Economist, December 2, 2006.
- Fialka, John. "Power Surge: After Decades, A Solar Pioneer Sees Spark in Sales." Wall Street Journal, November 27, 2006.
- Fritzsche, Hellmut, and Brian Schwartz. Stanford R. Ovshinsky: The Science and Technology of an American Genius. Singapore: World Scientific Publishing Co., 2008.
- Hornblower, Margot. "Listen, Detroit: You'll Get a Charge Out of This." TIME, February 22, 1999, Heroes for the Planet.
- Howard, George S. Stan Ovshinsky and the Hydrogen Economy:…Creating a Better World. Notre Dame: Academic Publications, 2006.
- Kridel, Tim. "Meet Stan Ovshinsky, the Energy Genius." Mother Earth News (October/ November 2006), Issue 218.
- Kho, Jennifer. "Energy Conversion Devices' Turnaround: Is BIPV Finally Ready to Take Off?" Renewable Energy World, January 16, 2009.
- Shaiken, Harley. "The Einstein of Alternative Energy?" Berkeley Review of Latin American Studies (Spring 2008): 28–31.
- Shaiken, Harley. "Jumpstarting the Americas." Berkeley Review of Latin American Studies (Fall 2008): 2–7.
- Vaitheeswaran, Vijay V. "Invent." The New York Times Magazine, April 20, 2008, The Green Issue.
- Carlisle, Norman. "The Ovshinsky Invention" Science & Mechanics, (February 1970): 38–40.
