= SB LiMotive =

2008–2012 Bosch–Samsung SDI venture

- Industry: Battery manufacturing
- Founded: 2008
- Defunct: 2012
- Key people: Jingun Lee; (President); Joachim Fetzer; (Executive Vice President)

SB LiMotive was a 50:50 joint venture between Bosch and Samsung SDI, established in June 2008 to develop and manufacture lithium-ion batteries for hybrid, plug-in hybrid and electric vehicles. The partnership was officially ended in September 2012, after which both companies continued their automotive battery operations independently.

== History ==
In September 2008, SB LiMotive Co. Ltd. started its operations in Korea. In October, the German subsidiary SB LiMotive Germany GmbH was founded. In July 2009, SB LiMotive acquired US-American battery manufacturer Cobasys. The groundbreaking of the cell manufacturing plant in Ulsan, Korea was two months later. In November 2010, the plant's inauguration took place.

In September 2012, the dissolution of the joint venture was announced. Bosch received $95 million from Samsung for its half. Samsung kept the lithium-ion cell production site in Ulsan and the development center in Giheung. Bosch absorbed the battery-system business section in Stuttgart-Feuerbach. American company Cobasys LLC was integrated into Bosch. The partners agreed to a mutual access to their about 3000 patents.

== Operations ==
SB LiMotive provided lithium-ion energy storage solutions from single cells to complete battery systems. Additionally, the joint venture supported customers with engineering services for software, battery management services and cooling systems.

Headquarters and cell development were located in Yongin, Gyeonggi-do, South Korea. At the second Korean site in Ulsan, the cell manufacturing plant was constructed in 9 months. Lithium-ion cells for pre-series projects were manufactured there since 2010 with series production planned for 2011. In Stuttgart-Feuerbach, Germany, battery systems were developed and prototypes were built. At its location in Germany, SB LiMotive also built a global team for sales, marketing, and management of key accounts. In 2009, SB LiMotive acquired the U.S. company Cobasys with its two sites in Orion Township, Michigan, and Springboro, Ohio. Nickel-metal hydride batteries were being manufactured there, and the location was used to support customers with the engineering of lithium-ion battery packs. At all locations, SB LiMotive employed worldwide some 700 associates in total (as of end of 2010).

=== Customers ===
SB LiMotive planned to supply lithium-ion battery cells to BMW for its electric vehicles, which are part of the "Megacity Vehicles" project.

SB LiMotive also planned to supply complete lithium-ion battery systems for the Fiat 500 EV. The production of cells would be in Ulsan, and the assembly of the battery pack in Springboro, Ohio. Chrysler intended to bring the Fiat 500EV to the US market from 2012 on.

== See also ==
- List of electric vehicle battery manufacturers
- Electric vehicle battery
