= Energy Conversion Devices =

American photovoltaics manufacturer

Energy Conversion Devices, Inc.
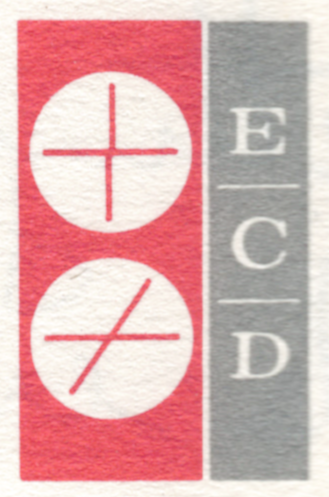
- Type: Public
- Traded as: Nasdaq: ENER (2003–2012)
- Industry: Alternative energy
- Founded: 1960; 66 years ago
- Founder: Stanford R. Ovshinsky
- Defunct: 2012; 14 years ago
- Fate: Bankruptcy
- Headquarters: Auburn Hills, Michigan, United States
- Key people: Joi Ito

Energy Conversion Devices, Inc. (ECD) was an American photovoltaics manufacturer of thin-film solar cells made of amorphous silicon used in flexible laminates and in building-integrated photovoltaics. The company was also a manufacturer of rechargeable batteries and other renewable energy related products. ECD was headquartered in Rochester Hills, Michigan.

Through its wholly owned Auburn Hills, Michigan, subsidiary United Solar Ovonic, LLC, better known as Uni-Solar, ECD was at one time the world's largest producer of flexible solar panels. Uni-Solar panels consisted of long rectangular strips with wiring at one end, which could be glued to any suitable supporting surface. They were widely used on flat roofs, motorhomes, semi-trailer cabs and similar roles.

On February 14, 2012, Energy Conversion Devices, Inc. and its subsidiaries, United Solar Ovonic LLC and Solar Integrated Technologies, Inc. filed for bankruptcy in the U.S. United States District Court for the Eastern District of Michigan.

== Company ==
Energy Conversion Devices, Inc. (ECD), through its United Solar Ovonic (USO) subsidiary, was engaged in building-integrated and rooftop photovoltaics (PV). The Company manufactured, sold and installed thin-film solar laminates that converted sunlight to electrical energy.

The Company operated in two segments: United Solar Ovonic and Ovonic Materials. The Company's USO segment consisted of its wholly owned subsidiary, United Solar Ovonic LLC, which was engaged in manufacturing of PV laminates designed to be integrated directly with roofing materials. The Ovonic Materials segment invented, designed and developed materials and products based on ECD's materials science technology. ECD, through its subsidiaries, commercialized materials, products and production processes for the alternative energy generation (primarily solar energy), energy storage and information technology markets.

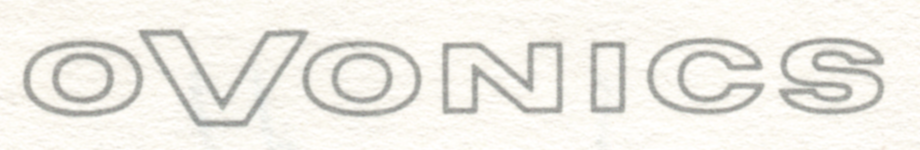
Energy Conversion Devices Ovonics logo 1970.

Ovonics (coined from "Ovshinsky" and "electronics") is a field of electronics that uses materials able to change from an electrically nonconducting state to a semiconducting state shown by glass of special composition upon application of a certain minimum voltage. The most important example is phase change memory.

Scientist-entrepreneur Stanford R. Ovshinsky pioneered the field and coined the term after he founded Energy Conversion Devices, Inc. (ECD) in 1960 to further his research in amorphous semiconductors. ECD Ovonics worked to create non-polluting, non-climate-changing energy sources.

Energy Conversion Devices, Inc. (ECD):

- Was a producer of flexible solar panels.
- Activity included NiMH batteries, solid-state hydrogen fuel storage, metal hydride fuel cells, and solar.
- Founder Stanford Ovshinsky was honored as "Hero for the planet" by Time magazine in 1999, and inducted into the U.S.-based Solar Energy Hall of Fame in 2005.
- ECD Ovonics stock was listed on the NASDAQ with symbol ENER in 2007 and on the Frankfurt Stock Exchange, before being delisted after filing for bankruptcy.

== Company structure ==
ECD Ovonics was divided into three parts, and had full or partial ownership of several other companies.

- Energy generation
  - United Solar Ovonic Corp (100% owned): flexible photovoltaic laminates producer
  - Solar Integrated, Inc. (100% owned): Solar installations administration, system design, engineering, construction, operations and maintenance
  - Ovonic Fuel Cell Company LLC (100% owned)
- Energy storage
  - Ovonic Hydrogen Systems LLC (100% owned)
  - Ovonic Battery Company (91.4% owned by ECD, 8.6% Honda, Sanyo and Sanoh)
    - Rare Earth Ovonic Inner Mongolia (19% owned by Ovonic Battery, 50% by Chevron)
    - Cobasys (50% owned by Ovonic Battery)
- Information technology
  - Ovonic Media (100% owned)
  - Ovonyx Inc. (39.5% owned by ECD)
  - Ovonic Cognitive Computer (95% owned by ECD, 5% by Ovonyx
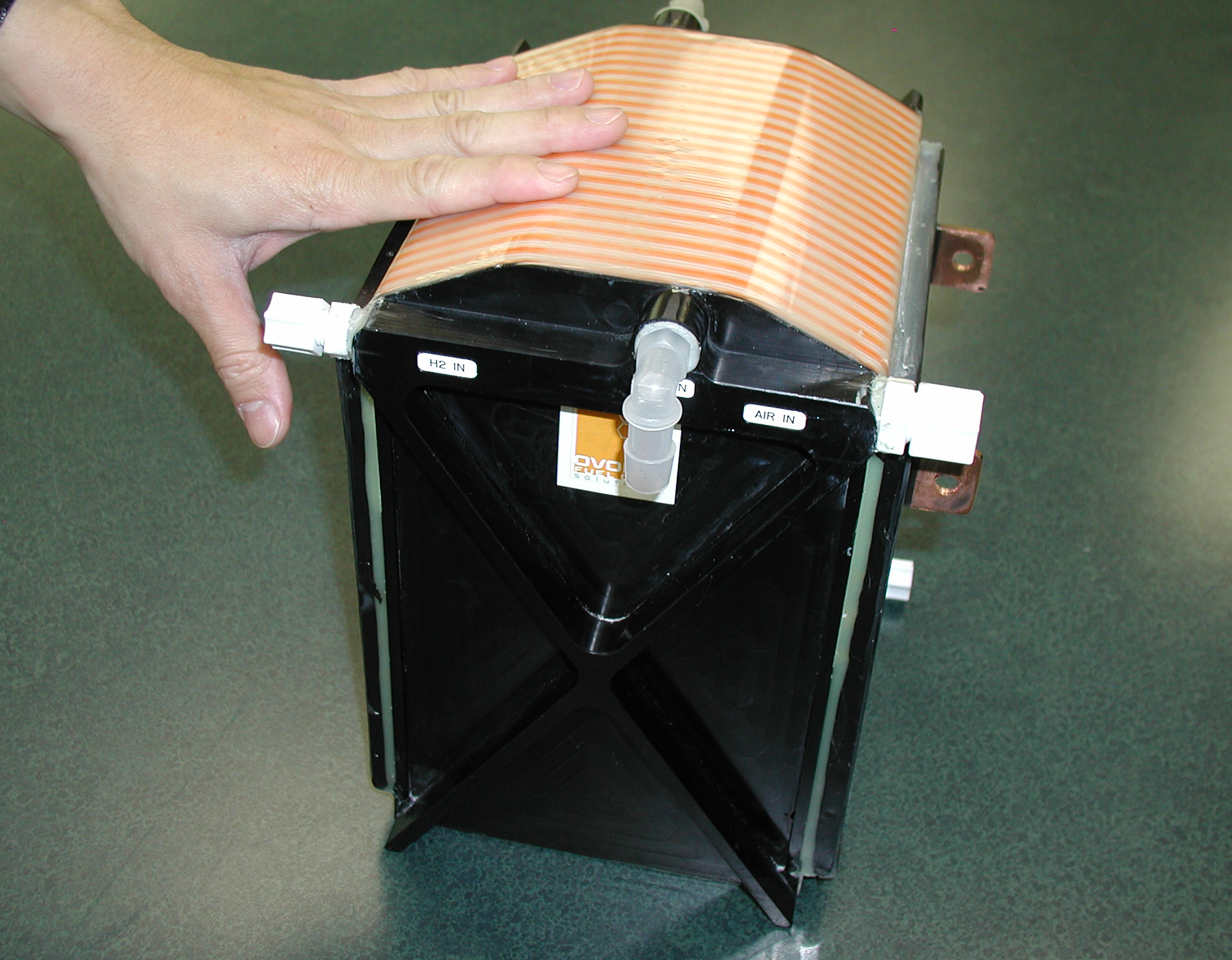
    Metal hydride fuel cell
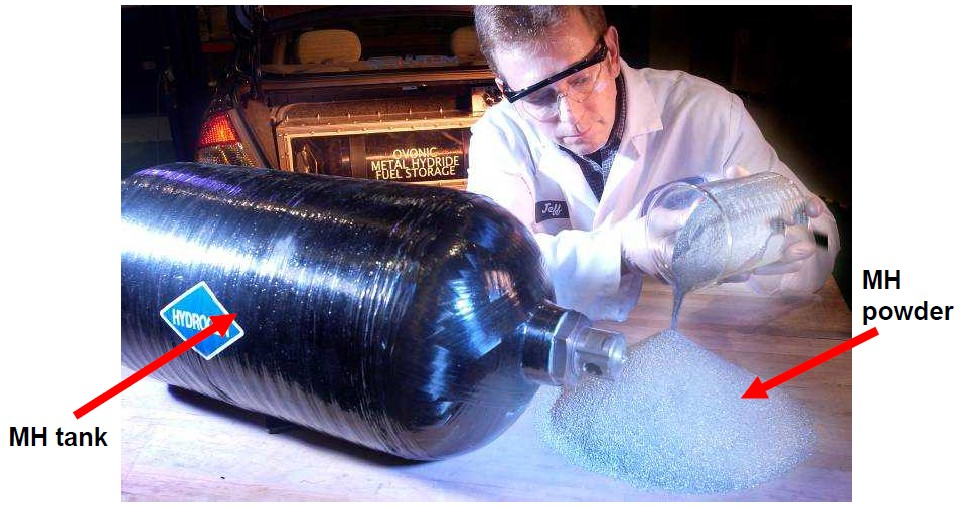
    Metal hydride for hydrogen storage
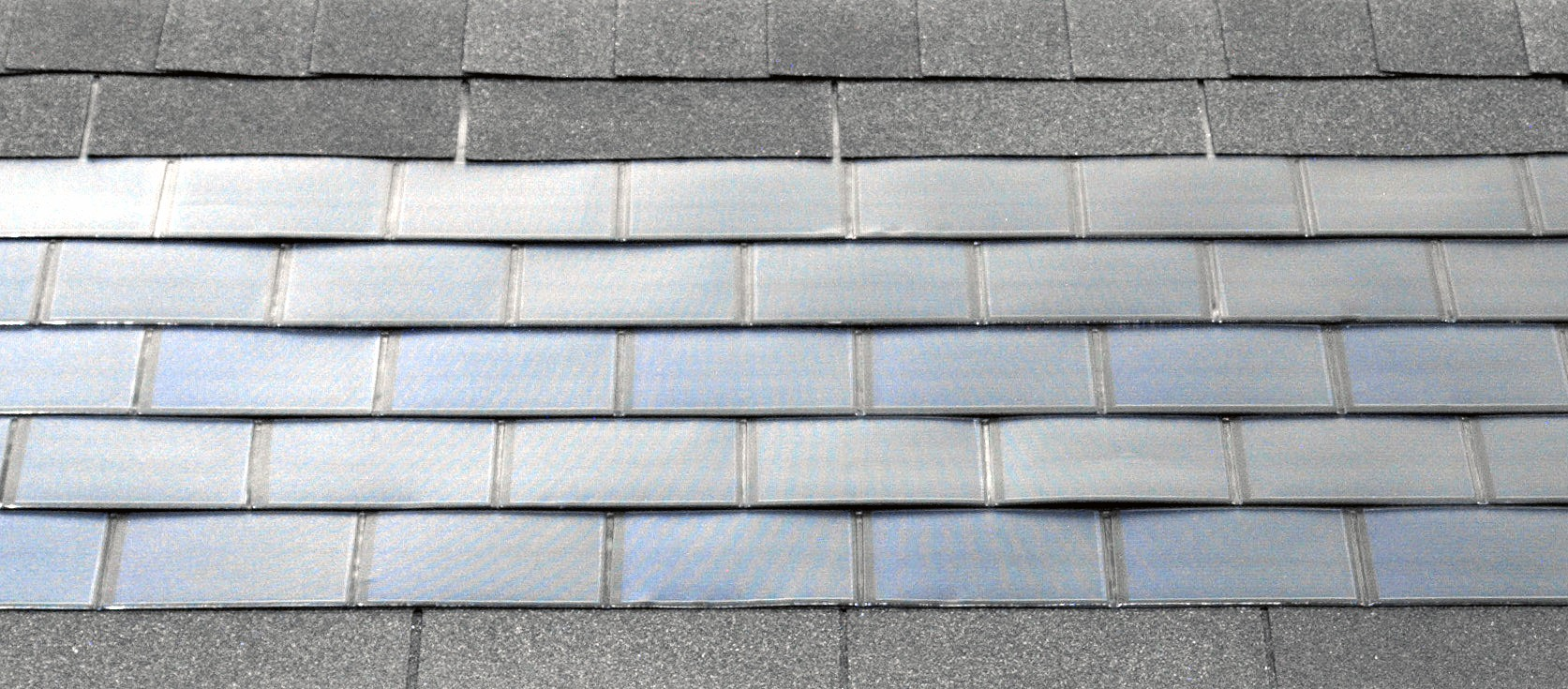
    United Solar Ovonic thin-film PV building-integrated solar shingles

== United Solar Ovonic Corporation ==
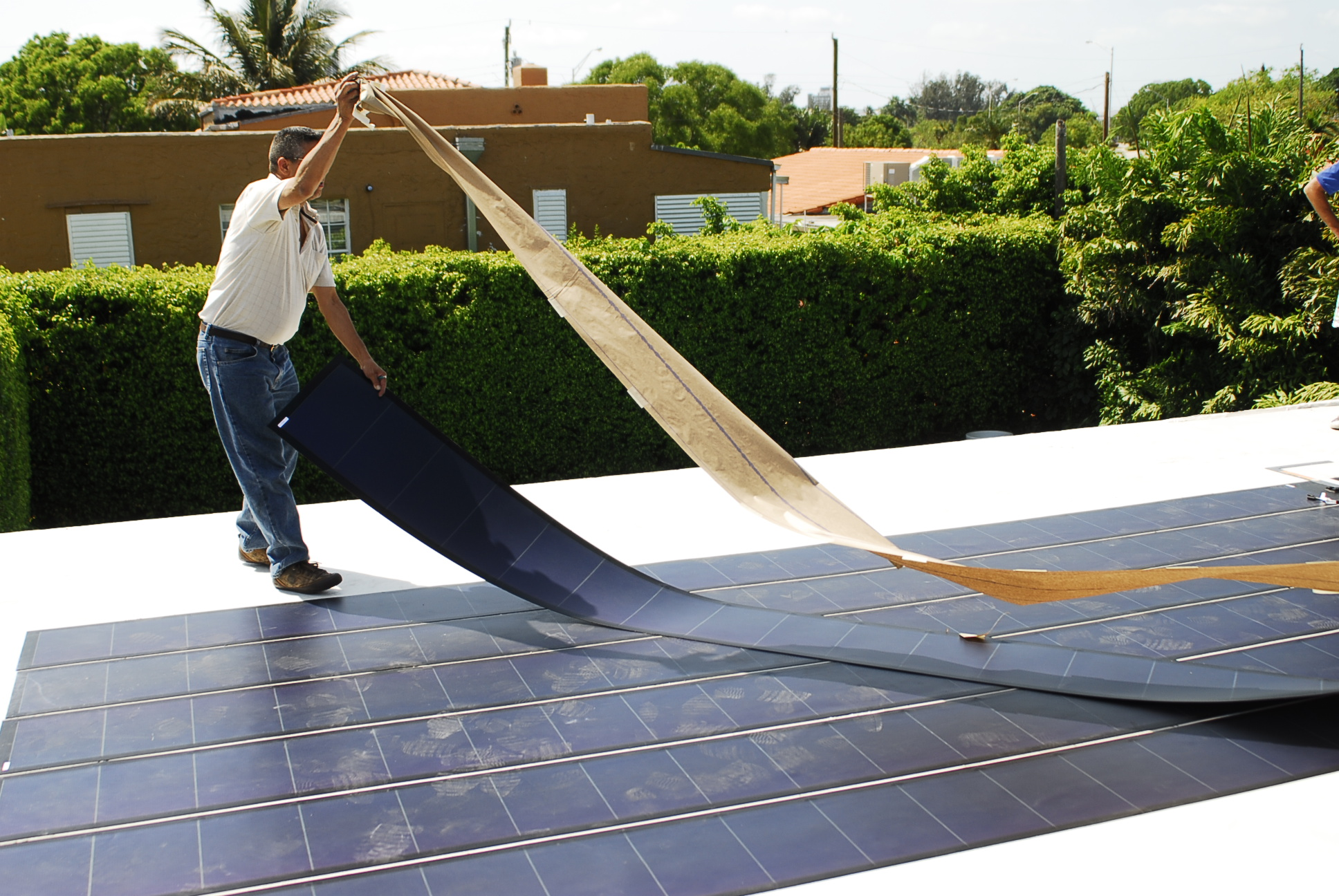
Final installation and layout of Uni-Solar Ovonic's thin film Flexible Solar PV panels

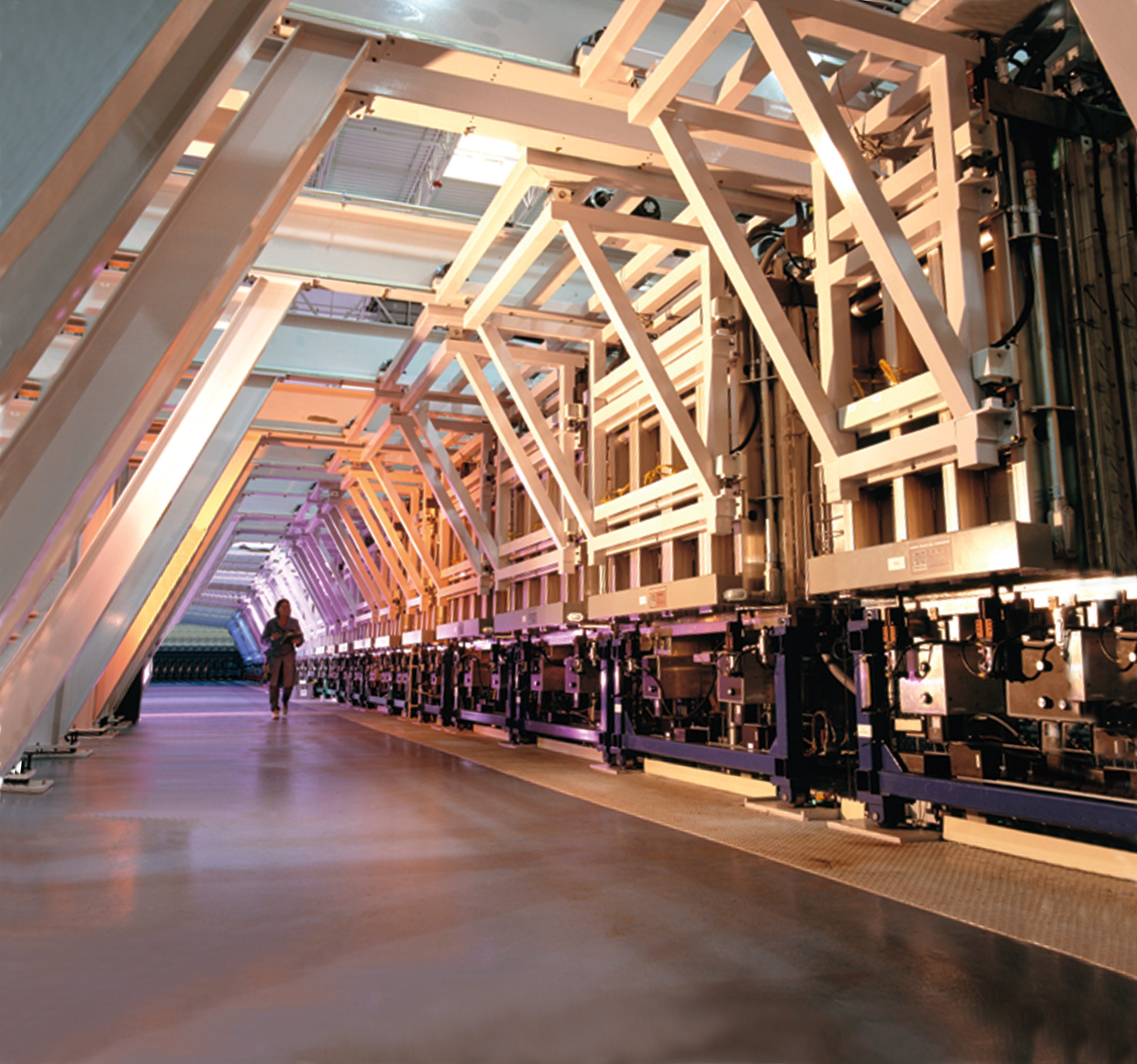
United Solar Ovonic roll-to-roll solar photovoltaic production line with 30 MW annual capacity

The United Solar Ovonic Corporation was at one time the world's largest (2008) manufacturer of photovoltaic laminates. In the broader category of thin film solar cells, as of 2007 the company was the second-largest U.S. manufacturer, after First Solar. The solar cells are made of 11 triple junction amorphous silicon solar cells connected in series and have 11–13% in conversion efficiency. The laminate encapsulation material was durable ETFE, high light-transmissive polymer. The laminates were sold under the trademark "UNI-SOLAR".

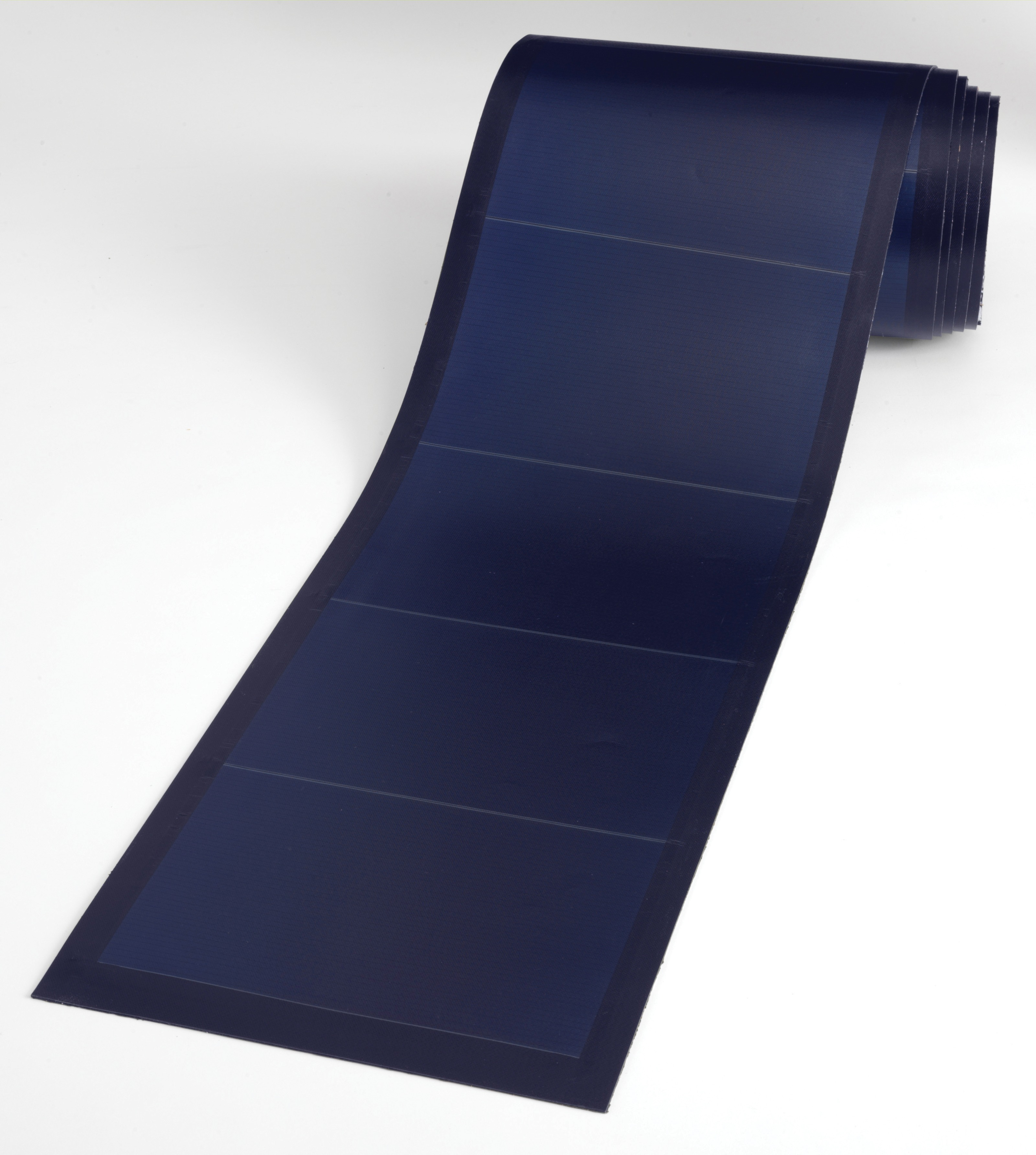
Solar PV Laminate Manufactured by United Solar Ovonic

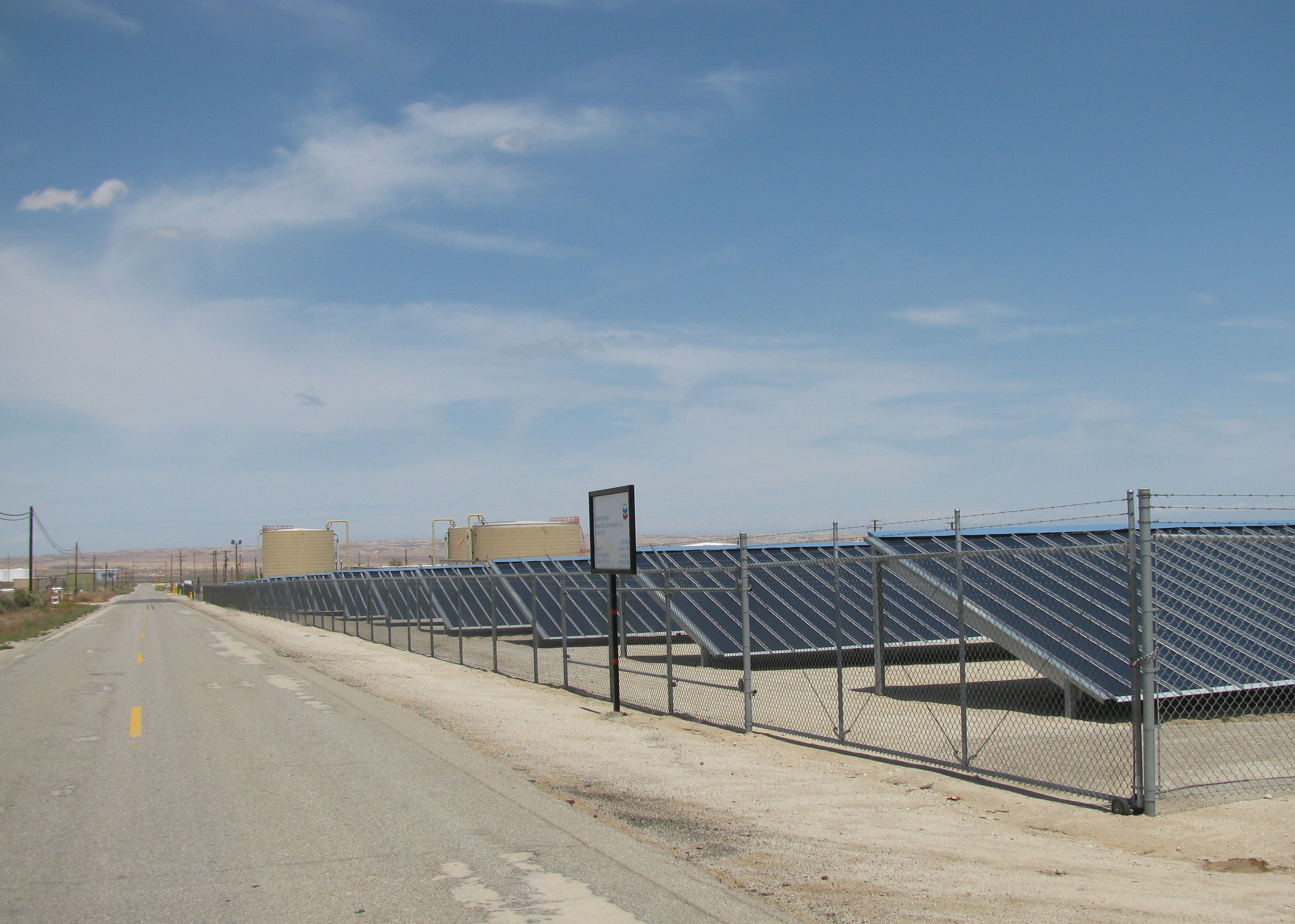
Chevron Solarmine solar PV system with United Solar Ovonic PV Laminates

Manufacturing and global headquarters were in Auburn Hills, Michigan. A second campus was constructed in Greenville, Michigan in 2007. Much of the production was sold to manufacturers and suppliers of building envelope elements, such as metal roofs (Rheinzink, Corus "Kalzip") or polymer roof membranes (Alwitra, Solar Integrated technologies). Flexible, thin-film solar PV products were also developed for space applications.

== Solar Integrated, Inc. ==
Solar Integrated, Inc. was a wholly owned subsidiary of Energy Conversion Devices, Inc. and as an EPC contractor (Engineering, Procurement, Construction), Solar Integrated took responsibility for the whole supply chain from administration, system design and engineering to purchasing, construction, operations and maintenance of Uni-Solar products.

== Ovonic batteries ==
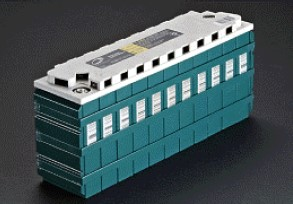
GM Ovonic NiMH Battery Module

Ovonic nickel–metal hydride (NiMH) batteries were used in the 1998 Chevrolet S-10 EV and the 1999 General Motors EV1, as well as many other hybrid vehicles in production today.

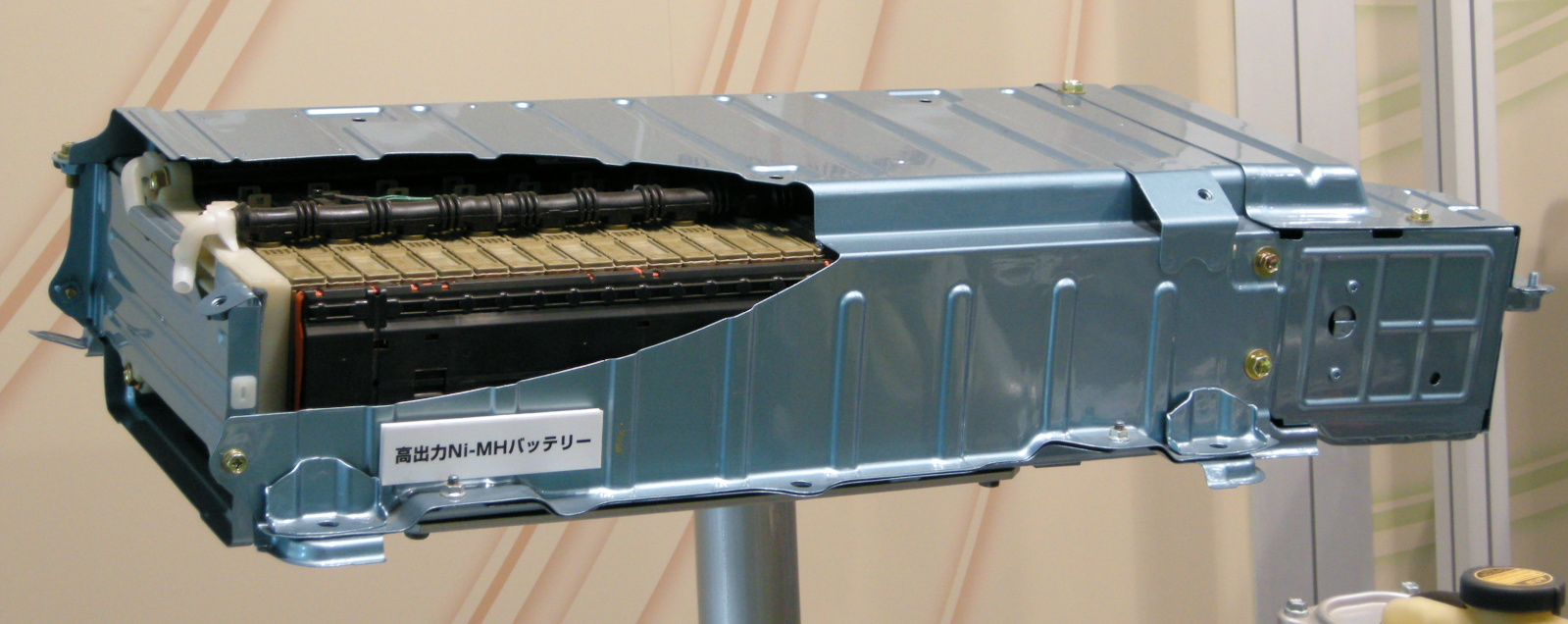
The high-power NiMH battery of a Toyota Prius

The battery was also used in an auto rickshaw concept vehicle made for Bajaj Auto, which burned hydrogen in an internal combustion engine. They made a report on it called "Clean Hydrogen Technology for 3-Wheel Transportation in India" and it stated that the performance was comparable with compressed natural gas (CNG) autos.

=== Patent encumbrance ===
In 1994, General Motors acquired a controlling interest in Ovonics's battery development and manufacturing, including patents controlling the manufacturing of large nickel metal hydride (NiMH) batteries.

On October 10, 2000, Texaco announced the purchase of General Motors' share in GM Ovonics, and Chevron announced its acquisition of Texaco six days later. In 2003, Texaco Ovonics Battery Systems was restructured into Cobasys, a 50/50 joint venture between Chevron and Energy Conversion Devices (ECD) Ovonics.

In addition to holding a 50% share of Cobasys, Chevron holds a 19.99% interest in ECD Ovonics. Chevron maintains veto power over any sale or licensing of Cobasys' NiMH technology. In addition, Chevron maintains the right to seize all of Cobasys' intellectual property rights in the event that ECD Ovonics does not fulfill its contractual obligations. On September 10, 2007, Chevron filed a legal claim that ECD Ovonics has not fulfilled its obligations. ECD Ovonics disputes this claim.

In her book, Plug-in Hybrids: The Cars that Will Recharge America, published in February 2007, Sherry Boschert argues that large-format NiMH batteries are commercially viable but that Cobasys refuses to sell or license them to small companies or individuals. Boschert reveals that Cobasys accepts only very large orders for these batteries. When Boschert conducted her research, major auto makers showed little interest in NiMH batteries. Since no other companies were capable of producing large orders, Cobasys was not manufacturing any NiMH batteries for automotive purposes.

In December 2006, Cobasys and General Motors announced that they had signed a contract under which Cobasys would provide NiMH batteries for the Saturn Aura hybrid sedan. Although announced, the car was later scrapped and Saturn has been shut down. In March 2007, General Motors announced that it would use Cobasys NiMH batteries in the 2008 Chevrolet Malibu hybrid as well. Cobasys remains unwilling to produce and sell NiMH batteries in smaller quantities to individuals interested in building or retrofitting their own plug-in hybrid electric vehicles (PHEVs). In 2009 Mercedes had planned to release an ML450 hybrid SUV in the United States, but Chevron, the parent company, pulled funding from Cobasys and the batteries were not delivered. On July 14, 2009 Cobasys was bought by SB LiMotive a joint venture of Samsung and Bosch before later being folded into Bosch itself. Although mistaken as owning the intellectual property to the large NiMH battery packs, according to CEO Tom Neslage they merely have an exclusive licensing deal with Chevron.

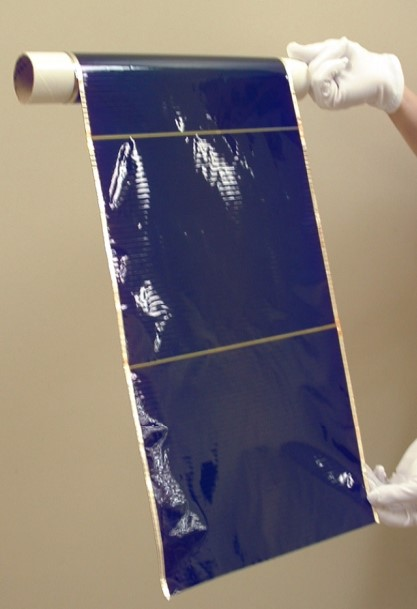
Flexible aerospace product from United Solar Ovonic

In February 2012, ECD sold its majority owned subsidiary, Ovonic Battery Company to BASF Corporation for the gross purchase price of $58 million in cash before transaction fees, minority participations, and working capital and other adjustments.

== See also ==
- Photovoltaic power stations
- Sustainable energy
