= Sherry Boschert =

American writer

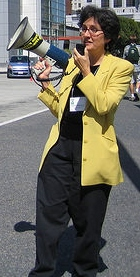
Sherry Boschert

Sherry Boschert is an author, journalist, and activist who currently is working on a history of Title IX. Her previous book, Plug-in Hybrids: The Cars That Will Recharge America helped jump-start the shift toward electric vehicles. Sherry has published more than 2,000 articles as a journalist. Her work has been published in The New York Times, the San Francisco Examiner, and other news outlets. She worked as a medical news reporter for Frontline Medical News from 1991-2015.

Sherry co-founded the non-profit organizations Plug In America and the Golden Gate Electric Vehicle Association. A 10-year campaign she began with the National Lesbian and Gay Journalists Association successfully persuaded news media companies to offer domestic partner benefits in the years before same-sex marriage became legal, allowing workers to extend employee benefits to their partners. As an environmentalist, she has been driving an electric car since 2002 and installed solar panels on her home's roof in 1998.

Boschert currently is working on a new book, a history of Title IX. She blogs on 37 Words.

== See also ==
- Plug-in hybrid
