= Electric truck =

Battery propelled freight motor vehicle

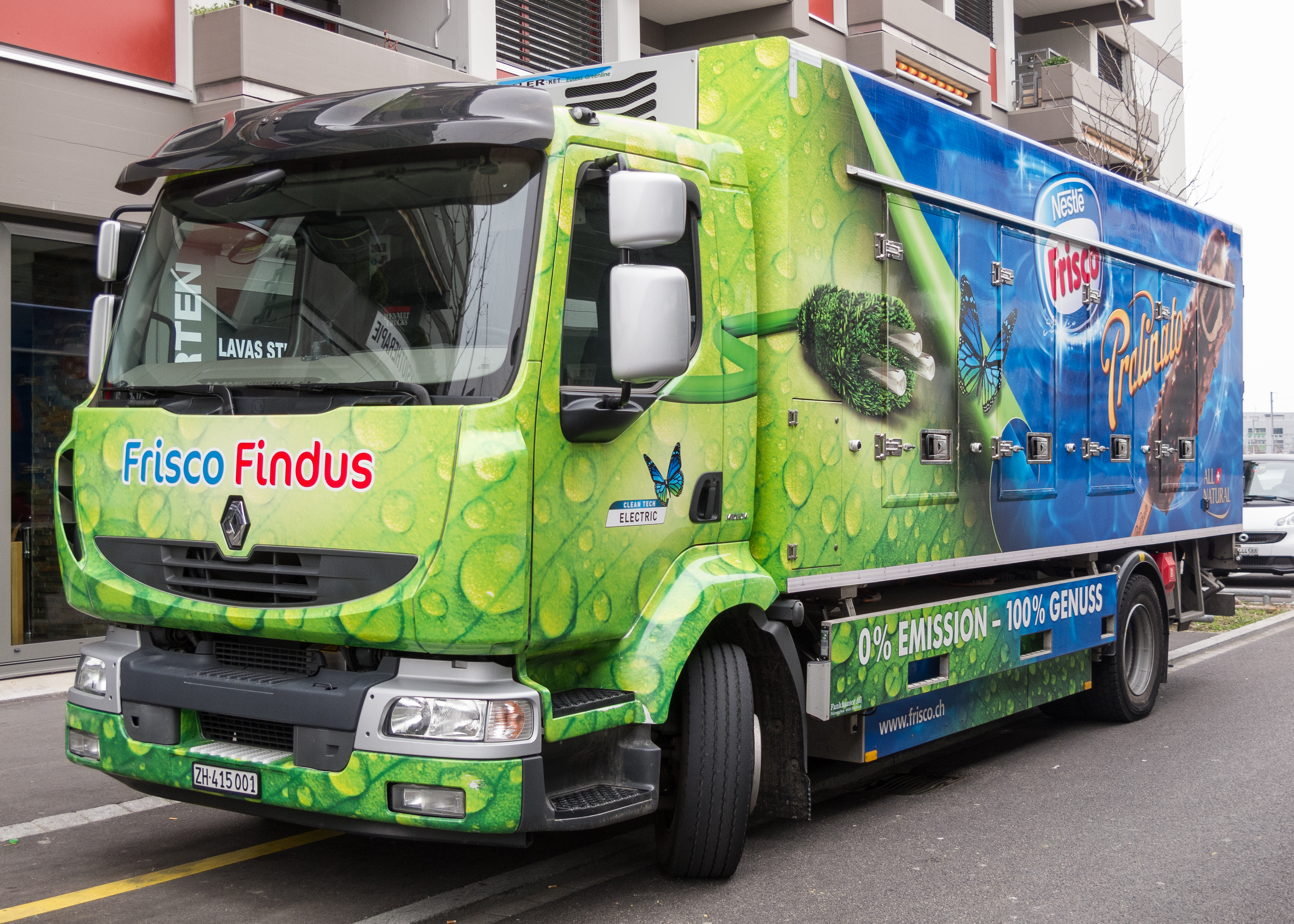
Electric Renault Midlum used by Nestlé in 2015

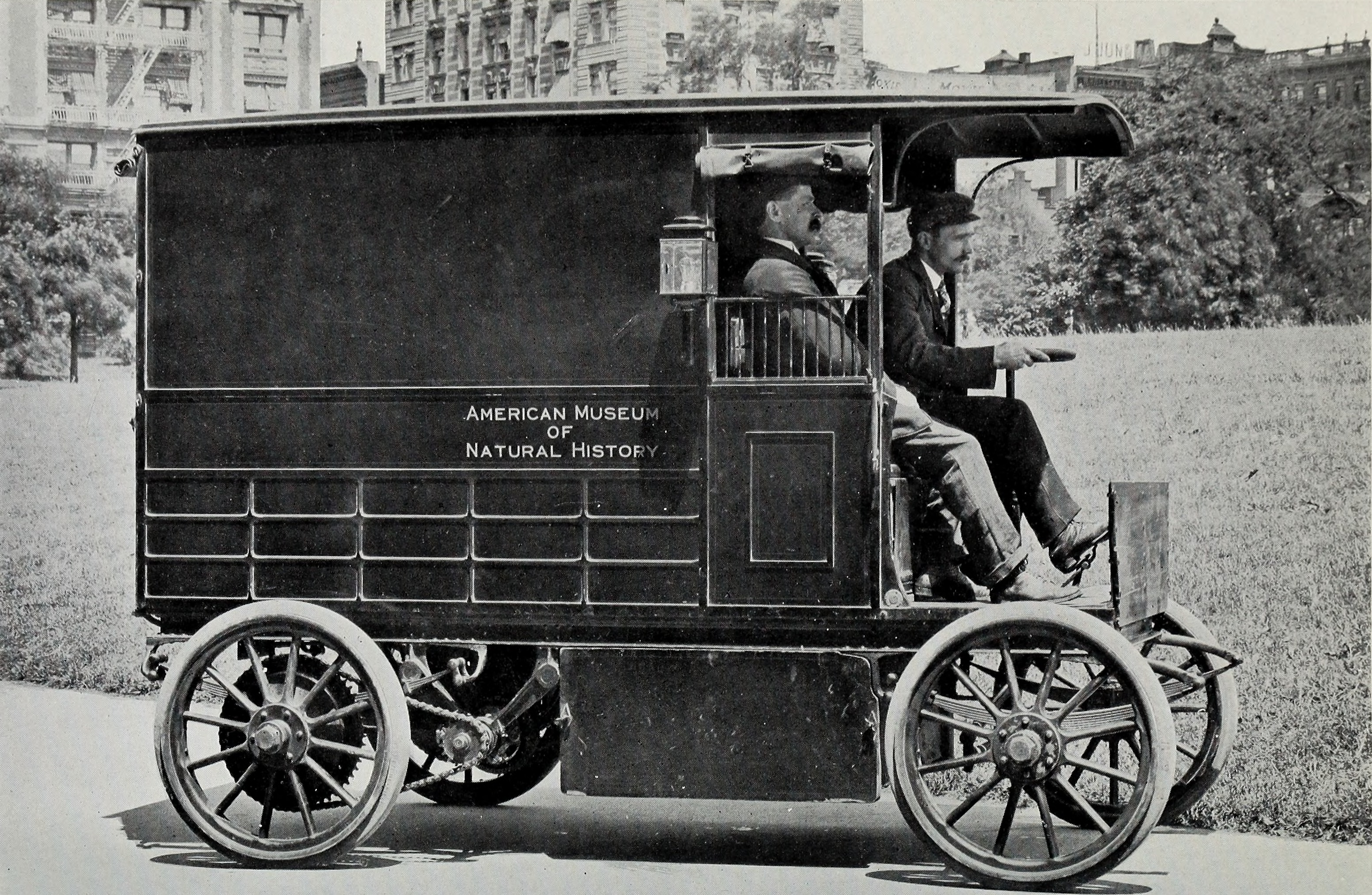
Auto Electric Truck, 1907

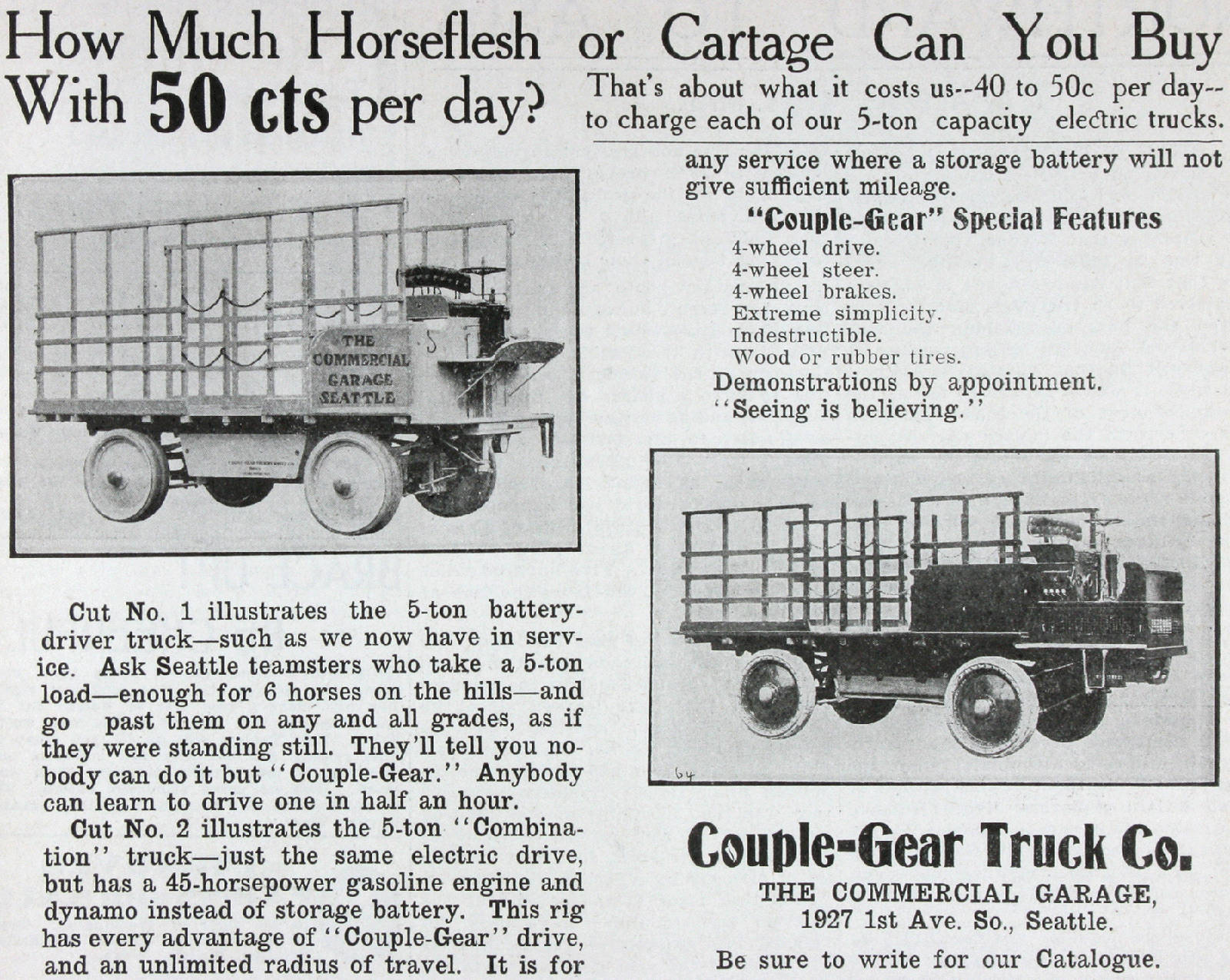
Advert for electric trucks from 1908

An electric truck is a battery electric vehicle (BEV) designed to transport cargo, carry specialized payloads, or perform other utilitarian work.

Electric trucks have serviced niche applications like milk floats, pushback tugs and forklifts for over a hundred years, typically using lead–acid batteries, but the rapid development of lighter and more energy-dense battery chemistries in the twenty-first century has broadened the range of applicability of electric propulsion to trucks in many more roles.

Electric trucks reduce noise and pollution, relative to internal-combustion trucks. Due to the high efficiency and low component-counts of electric power trains, no fuel burning while idle, and silent and efficient acceleration, the costs of owning and operating electric trucks are dramatically lower than their predecessors. According to the United States Department of Energy, the average cost per kWh capacity of battery packs for trucks fell from $500 in 2013 to $200 in 2019, and still further to $137 in 2020, with some vehicles under $100 for the first time.

Long-distance freight has been the trucking segment least amenable to electrification, since the increased weight of batteries, relative to fuel, detracts from payload capacity, and the alternative, more frequent recharging, detracts from delivery time. By contrast, short-haul urban delivery has been electrified rapidly, since the clean and quiet nature of electric trucks fit well with urban planning and municipal regulation, and the capacities of reasonably sized batteries are well-suited to daily stop-and-go traffic within a metropolitan area.

Electrification of trucking has gathered pace in the 2020s, with analysis by the think-tank Carbon Tracker indicating tipping points in the total cost of ownership of battery-electric trucks compared to diesel-fuelled trucks heading into the early 2030s. Electric truck sales reached 9% of all truck sales globally in 2025, with sales growing across all size classes. 26% of all new trucks sold in China in 2025 were electric, with the country accounting for over 90% of electric truck sales globally. Electric trucks also accounted for 3% of new trucks in Europe, although US sales remained concentrated in delivery vans with electric heavier freight vehicle penetration remaining weak.

In South Korea, electric trucks hold a noticeable share of the new truck market; in 2020, among trucks produced and sold domestically (which are the vast majority of new trucks sold in the country), 7.6% were all-electric vehicles. In Norway and Sweden, the market share of electric trucks among heavy trucks only (those heavier than 16 tonnes) was 7.8% and 6.5%, respectively, in the year 2024, and heavy electric trucks made by traditional European truckmakers were in series production.

== History ==
Autocar Trucks and several other pioneering American truck manufacturers, such as the Walker Vehicle Company (see Walker Electric Truck), offered a range of electric trucks for sale in the 1920s. While electric trucks were successful for short-range work, especially in cities, the higher energy-density of non-renewable fuels soon led to the decline of electric-powered trucks until battery technology advanced in the 2000s.

== Types ==
=== General trucks ===
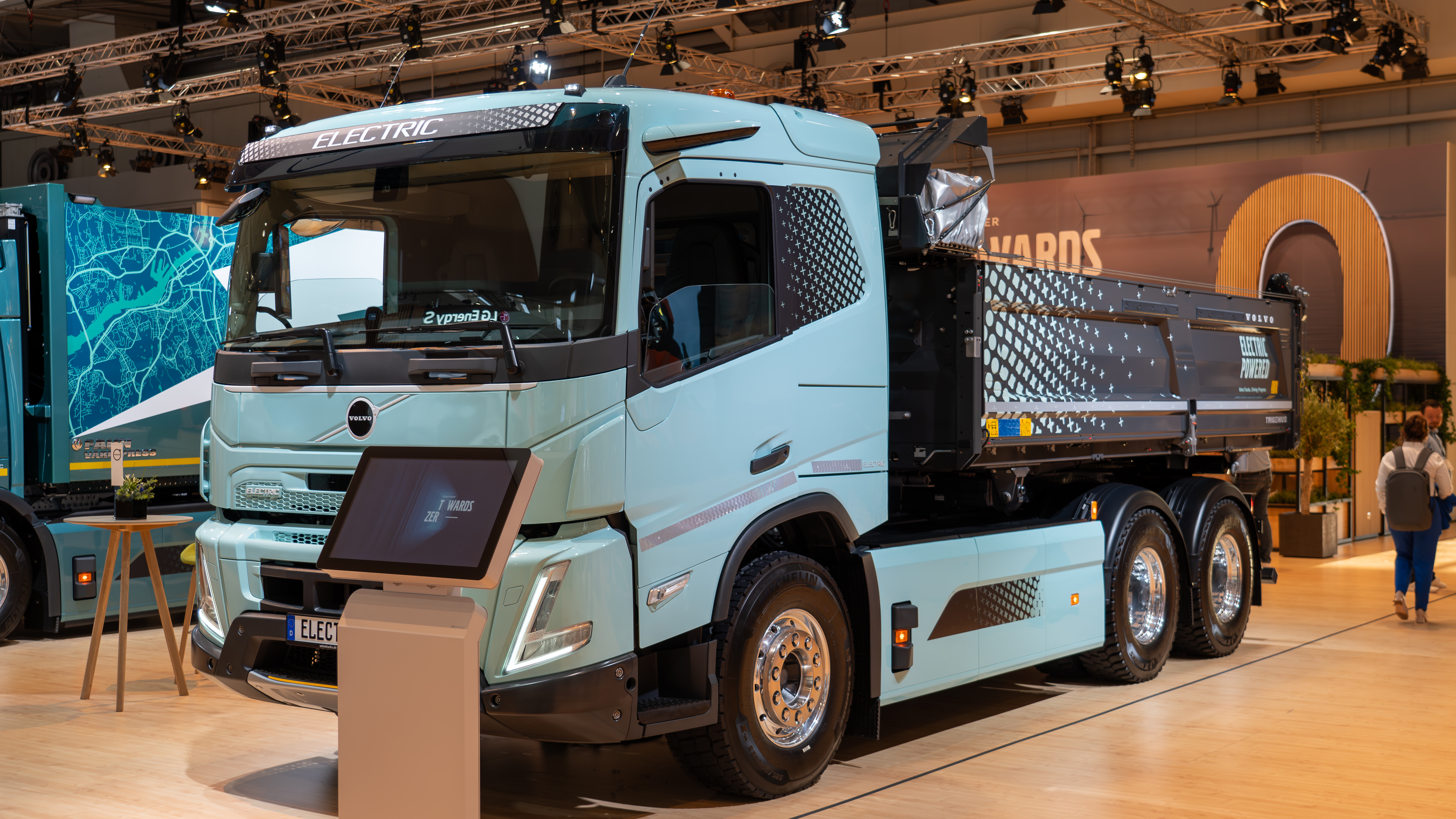
Volvo FMX Electric, configured here as a straight truck with a dump truck body, is one of a multitude of electric trucks that are now in series production

A few electric general lorries prototypes or produced by small manufacturers, and often converted Diesel units, have been built until the 2000s. Trials with different companies in real-world conditions, for several months or more, have been conducted, for example with Renault, E Force and Emoss heavy-duty lorries in the 2010s. Renault launched its small electric Maxity in 2010 and Mitsubishi Fuso its slightly larger eCanter in 2017. From 2018, other major manufacturers including MAN, Mercedes-Benz and DAF began deliveries of prototypes or pre-production heavy-duty units to companies for real-world testing.

Series production of heavy-duty electric trucks already started, including those from Renault, Volvo and MAN.

The Futuricum Logistics 18E, first delivered in March 2021 to DPD in Switzerland, uses a 680-kWh battery and has a range of "up to" 760 km (472 mi).

=== Delivery trucks ===
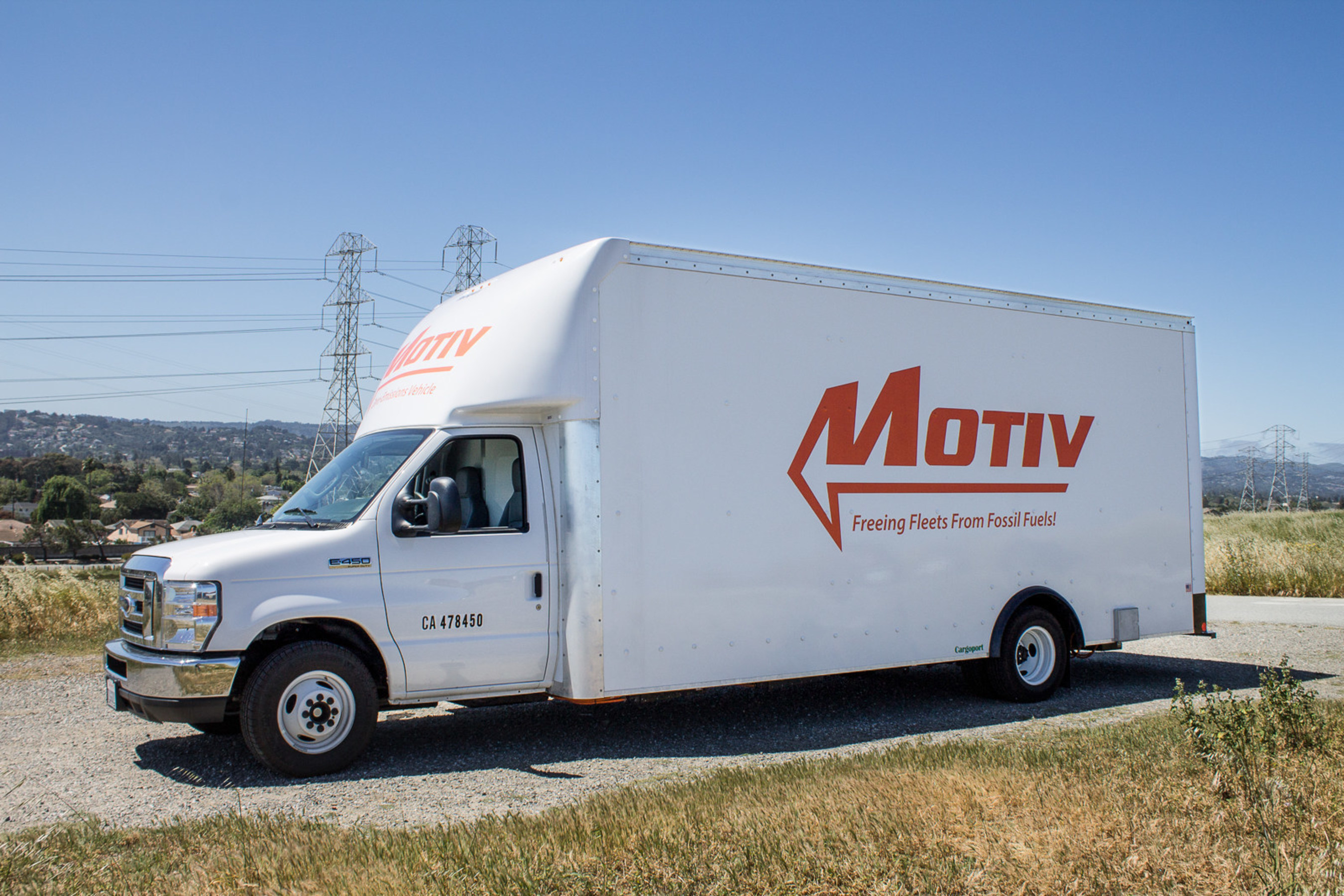
Electric Box truck in 2019

Last-mile delivery trucks are a growing segment of truck traffic with the increase in e-commerce and direct-to-consumer sales. Also known as Walk-in-Vans and box trucks, these trucks tend to be used on either fixed routes or with a fixed region for deliveries. Large buyers of these trucks include Amazon, UPS, FedEx, Bimbo, Aramark and others. With use from direct-to-consumer sales to things like linen and bread deliveries or beverage distribution, these trucks are very common. Motiv Power Systems has delivered units used by United States Postal Service and Bimbo Bakeries USA based on Ford chassis. These Motiv options have a variety of body styles from conventional manufacturers including Morgan Olson, Utilimaster, and Rockport.

Lightning EMotors has delivery trucks built on the Izusu platform. BYD Auto has several truck models ranging from class 4 through 8 trucks. GM subsidiary BrightDrop is trying to develop custom solutions for this market. Rivian has supplied a significant number of electric delivery vans to Amazon.

Many large automotive companies have made announcements about their intent to enter this market with showcases of their prototypes.

=== Pickup trucks ===
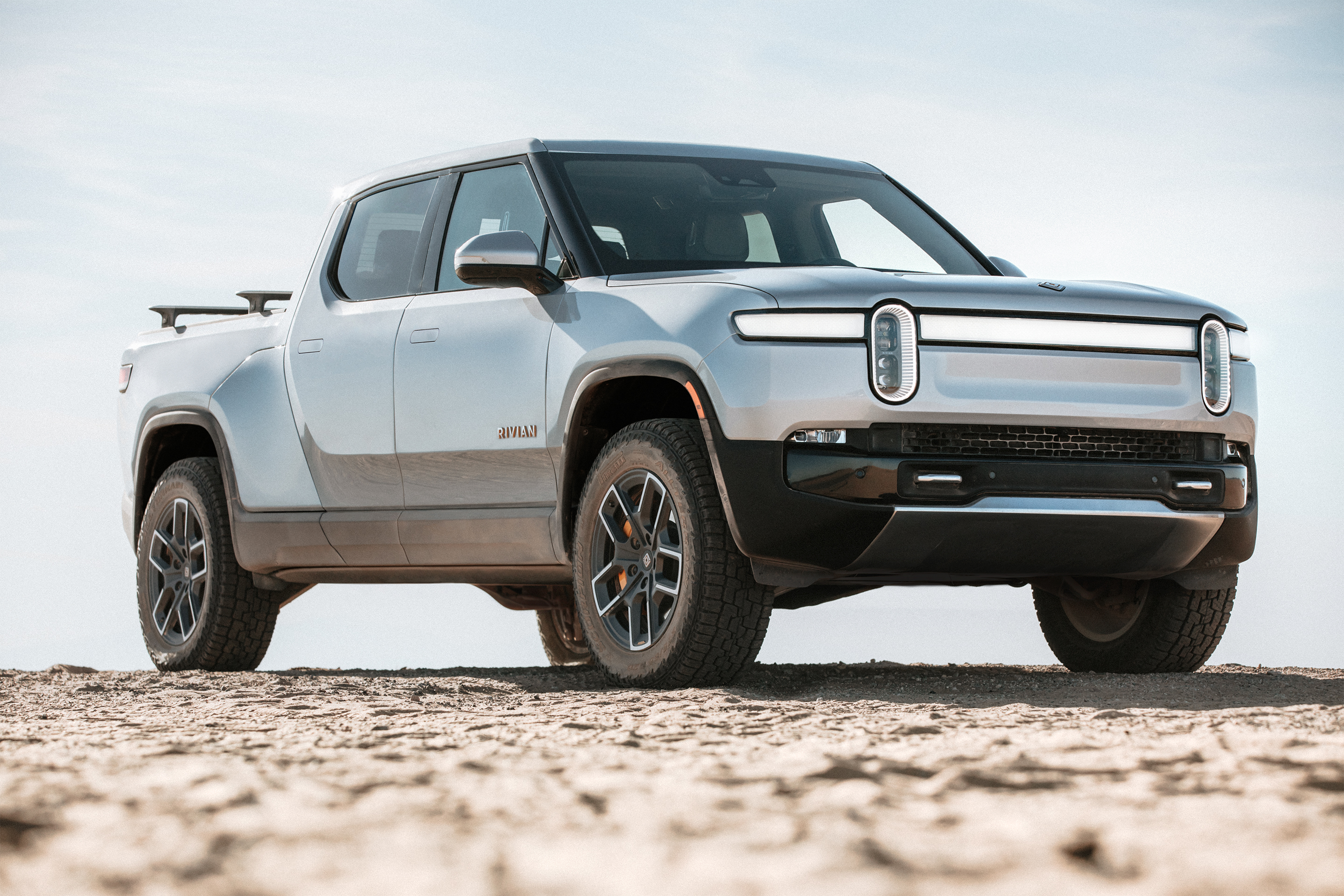
The Rivian R1T was the first modern electric pickup to market in North America.

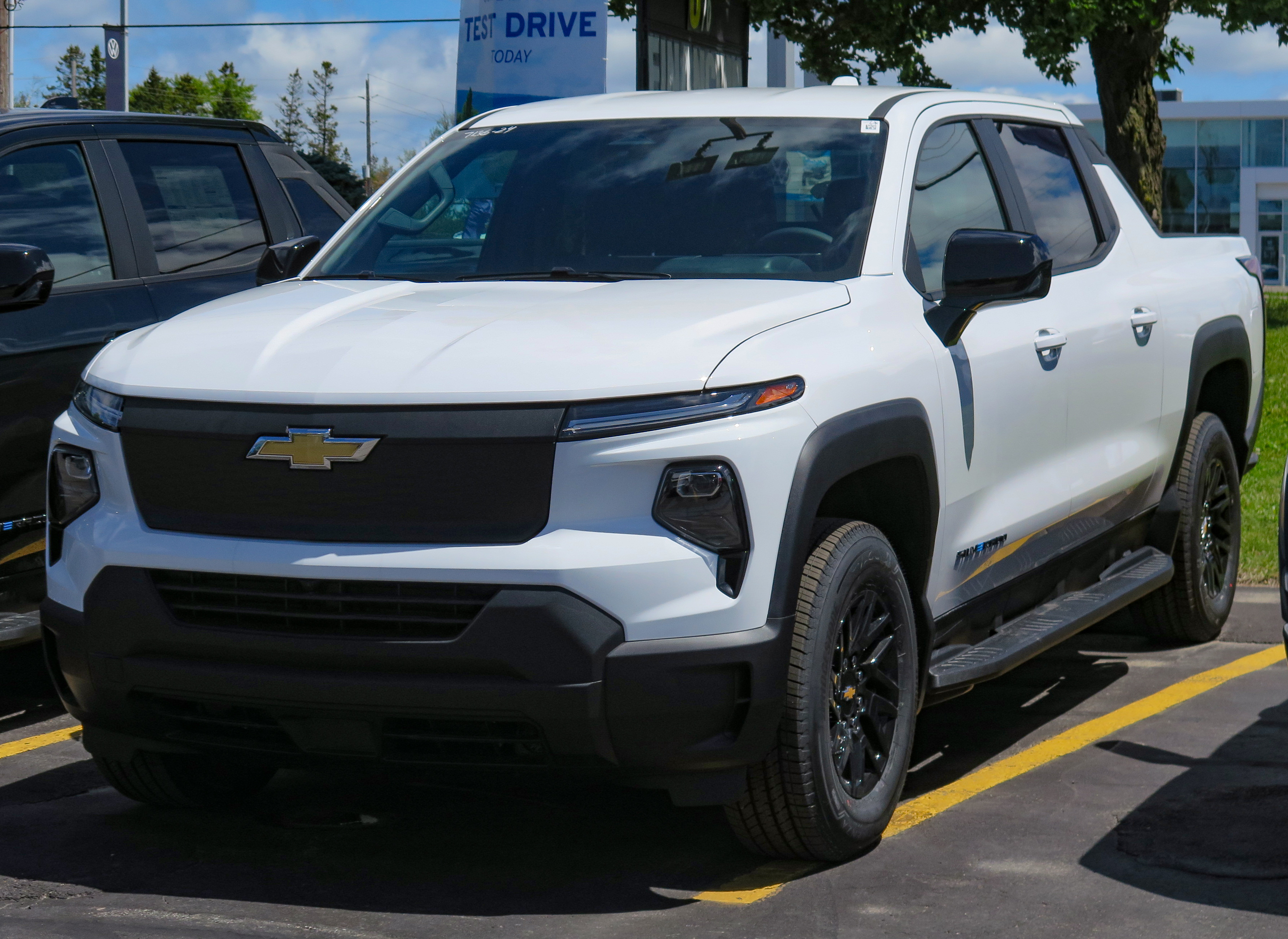
The Chevrolet Silverado EV is one of many electric pickup trucks that are now being produced around the world.

In the late 1990s and early 2000s, Chevrolet produced a small series of an electric S-10 pickup truck while Ford made a certain number of Ranger EVs.

In early 2009, Phoenix Motorcars introduced a test fleet of their all-electric SUT (Sports Utility Truck) to Maui. Miles Electric Vehicles imported the Chinese-designed ZX40ST electric small pick-up in the United States in the late 2010s.

Canadian company Ecotuned made an all-electric conversion of the Ford F-150 ; these vehicles were in service with the electricity provider Hydro Quebec and Montreal Airport in 2019.

As of 2022, Rivian made the R1T all-electric pickup truck in Normal, Illinois. General Motors is making the GMC Hummer EV and the Silverado EV. In 2023, deliveries of the Tesla Cybertruck began.

In 2025, Ford halted production of the F-150 Lightning.

Models in production include:

- JAC Shuailing i3-T330
- Dongfeng Rich EV, Rich 6 EV and Rich 7 EV
- JMC Yuhu 7 EV
- Jiangxi Isuzu Ruimai EV
- Great Wall Wingle 7 EV
- GWM Poer EV
- ZERO ZED70
- JAC T9 Hunter EV
- Rivian R1T
- GMC Hummer EV
- GMC Sierra EV
- Radar RD6
- Tesla Cybertruck
- Chevrolet Silverado EV
- Maxus T90 EV

=== Semi-trailer and tractor trucks ===
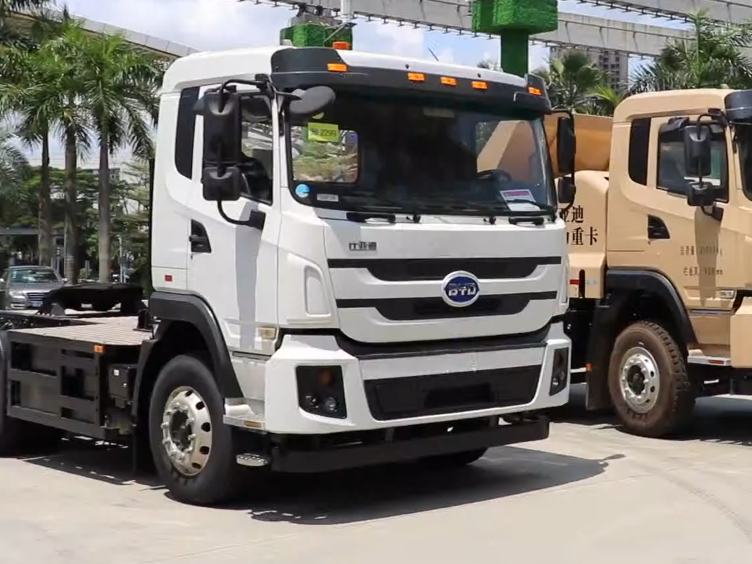
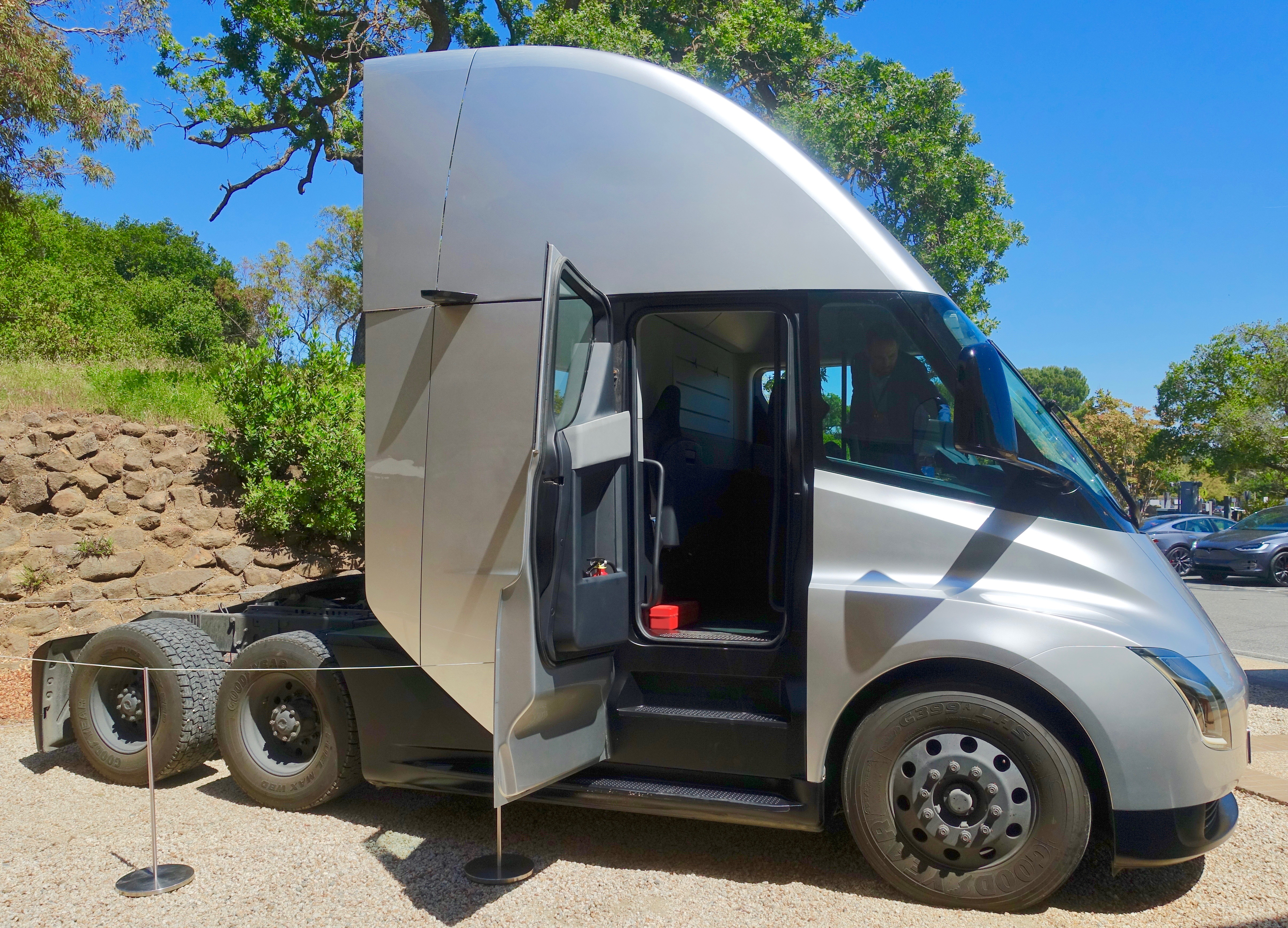
Top: BYD 8TT, bottom: Tesla Semi

In the European market, as of 2025, electric semi-trucks from many traditional truck manufacturers are sold commercially (and not merely tested by customers on a limited scale). These manufacturers include Volvo, DAF, MAN, Volvo's subsidiary Renault Trucks, Mercedes-Benz and Scania. Volvo had the largest market share of the European electric truck market in 2024 (semi-trucks and other types of trucks combined).

As of 2025, the battery capacity of long-distance trucks is about 600 kWh in the case of the Mercedes eActros 600 or 500-600 kWh in the case of the Volvo FH electric.

The Swiss company Designwerk (purchased by Volvo), manufacturing trucks under the brand Futuricum, built and delivered a few long-range electric semi-trucks by equipping them with a 900 kWh/765 kWh (gross/net capacity) battery. The range is estimated at 500 km (310 miles).

In North America, in 2020, electric semi-trucks were in limited commercial use in California at Anheuser-Busch, GSC Logistics, Golden State Express (all using the BYD 8TT semi-tractor), Penske, and NFI (both using the Freightliner eCascadia semi-tractor). These trucks are not limited to operation within seaports or drayage operations; their range (in the case of the BYD 8TT, 200 km (124 miles) at full load and 269 km (167 miles) at half load) allows use on regional routes. GSC Logistics demonstrated this by hauling cargo from the Port of Oakland, over the Altamont Pass, to Tracy, CA and back. After returning, the truck still had 40% of its battery remaining.

Electric semi-trucks from Volvo are also sold in the North American market. Tesla joined in 2022 with the Tesla Semi. Freightliner manufactures the eCascadia. The Kenworth T680E became available in 2021.

Electric semi-trucks are also manufactured by BYD Auto (e.g., BYD 8TT).

On 13 May 2021, Autocar Trucks announced the launch of the E-ACTT, a fully electric terminal tractor. 98 years earlier, Autocar was the first major truck manufacturer to introduce electric trucks, in 1923.

A 93-ton electric truck carrying wood waste started operating in Sweden in 2025.

==== History ====
The Port of Los Angeles and South Coast Air Quality Management District have demonstrated a short-range heavy-duty all-electric truck capable of hauling a fully loaded 40-foot (12.2 m) cargo container. The current design is capable of pulling a 27,000 kg (60,000 lb) cargo container at speeds up to 16 km/h (10 mph) and has a range of between 50 and 100 km (30 and 60 miles). It uses 2 kWh/mi (4.5 MJ/km), compared to 47 L/100 km; 6.0 mpg_{‑imp} (5 mpg_{‑US}) for the hostler semi tractors it replaces.

==== Economics ====
3.8 L (1 US gal; 0.83 imp gal) of fuel is equivalent to 33.7 kWh, according to the US Department of Energy. This electric truck uses 1.2 kW⋅h/km (2 kWh/mi) which is the equivalent of using only 10 kWh per every 8 km (5 miles). The diesel truck that it replaces uses the equivalent of 33.7 kWh per 8 km (5 miles). Thus, the diesel truck is using 3.37 times the amount of energy that the electric truck is using. Therefore, the only variables that are stopping commercial use of electric trucks are original vehicle cost and driving range, owing to the high battery pack cost and low specific energy. As mass production begins, the cost might eventually be comparable to diesel vehicles and with improvement in batteries the limited range of the electric truck might be a non-issue.

=== Cargo vans ===
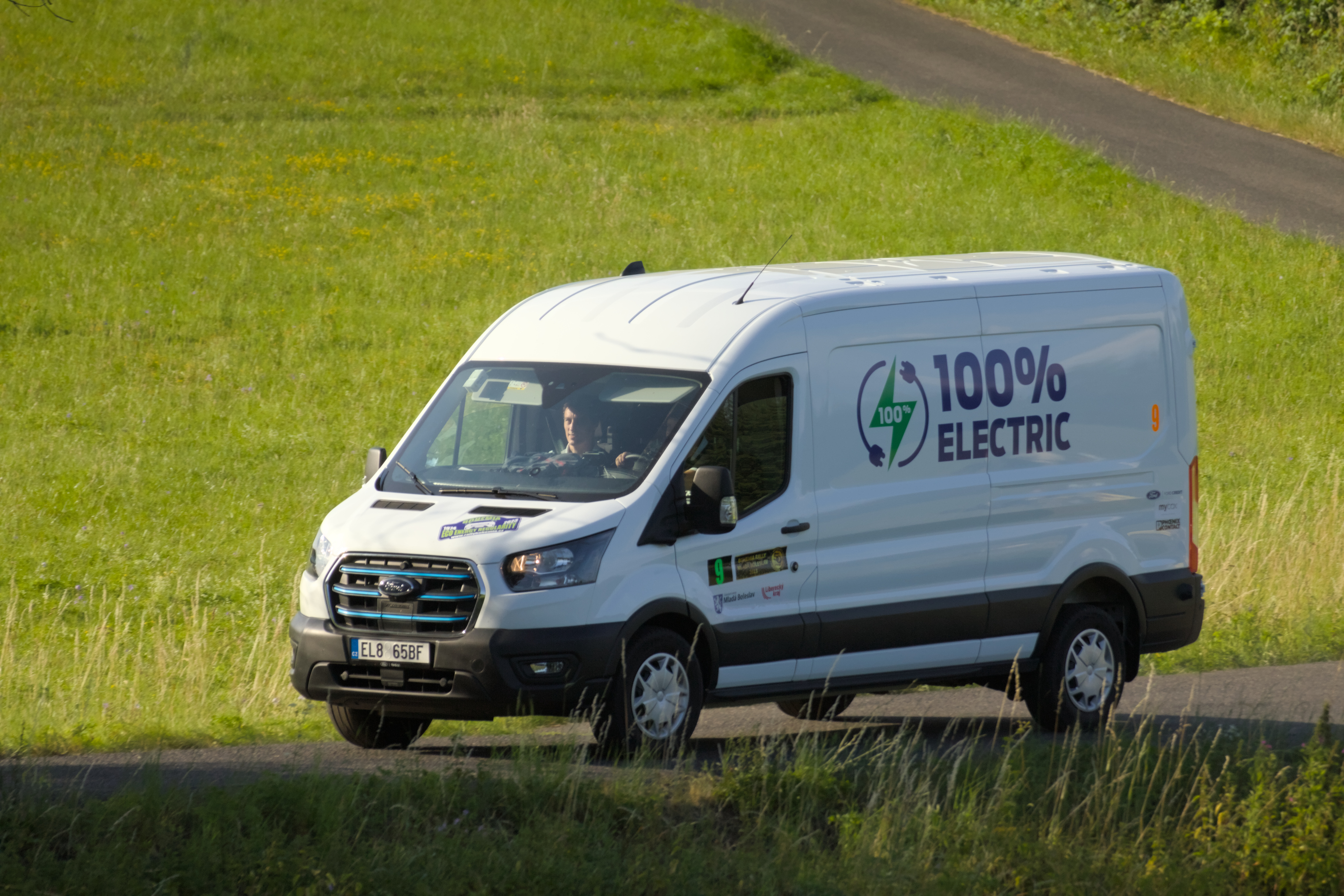
Electric cargo van, Ford E-Transit

As of 2022, the following models (among others) are available in Europe:

| Make | model |
|---|---|
| Citroen | e-Jumper |
| Citroen | ë-Jumpy |
| Fiat | E-Ducato |
| Fiat | E-Scudo |
| Ford | E-Transit |
| Maxus | eDeliver 3 |
| Maxus | eDeliver 9 |
| Mercedes | eVito (Note: As of April 2025, in continental Europe, Mercedes finally offers the eVito cargo van with a 90-kWh battery. Previously, cargo versions of the eVito were offered only with batteries of smaller capacity, and the 90-kWh battery was available only on the passenger van version.) |
| Mercedes | eSprinter |
| Opel | Vivaro-e |
| Peugeot | Peugeot e-Boxer |
| Peugeot | e-Expert |
| Renault | Master E-Tech Electric |
| Toyota | ProAce Electric |
| Volkswagen | ID.Buzz Cargo |

=== Milk float ===
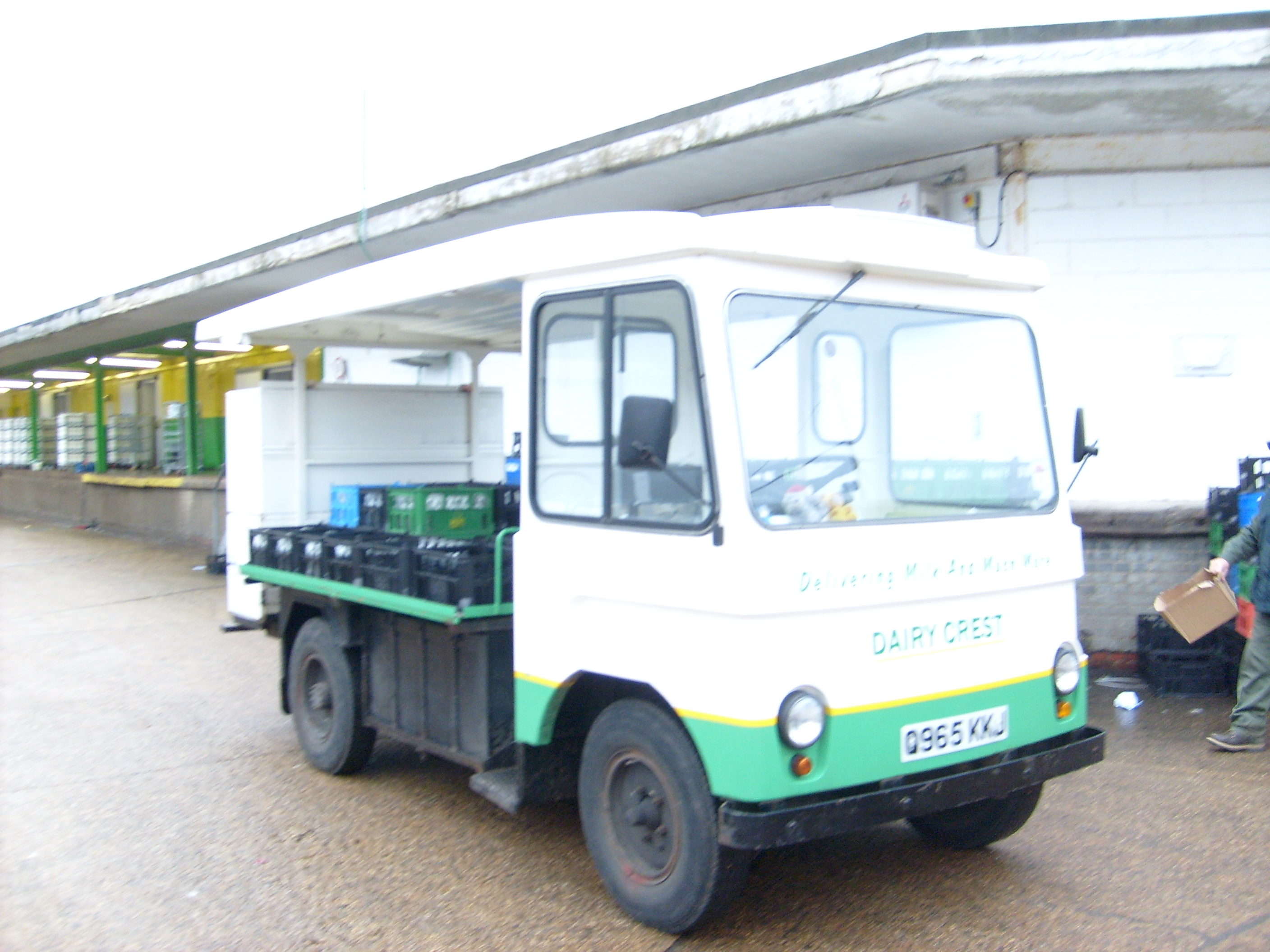
A Dairy Crest Smith's Elizabethan milk float

A common example of the battery electric trucks is the milk float. Because such vehicles make many stops, it is more practical to use an electric vehicle than a combustion truck, which would be idling much of the time; it also reduces noise in residential areas. For most of the 20th century, the majority of the world's battery electric road vehicles were British milk floats.

=== Garbage truck ===
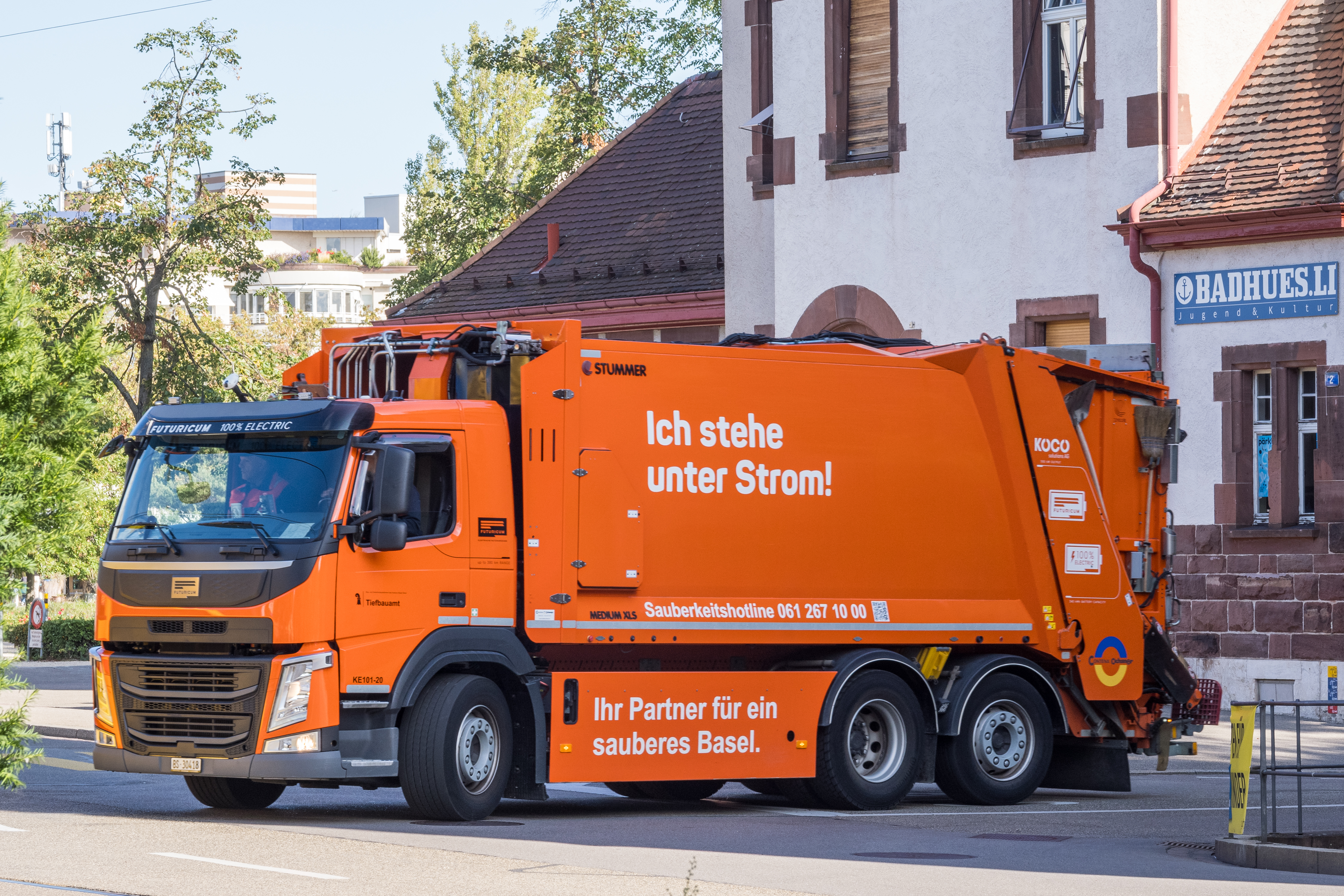
Futuricum, fully electric refuse collection vehicle from Designwerk, used by the city of Basel.

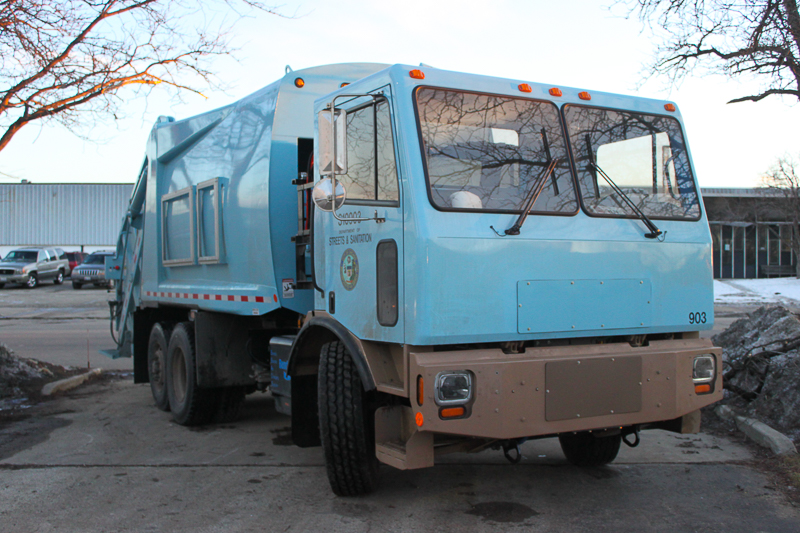
The first all-electric refuse truck in the United States built for the City of Chicago

With a similar driving pattern of a delivery vehicle like the milk float, garbage trucks are excellent candidates for electric drive. Most of their time is spent stopping, starting or idling. These activities are where internal combustion engines are their least efficient. These and other factors such as ease of driver training resulted in Birmingham City Council opting to use electric dustcarts to start replacing its horse driven carts in 1918. Its use of electric vehicles continued through a number of models including Electricar DV4s until 1971. Electric dustcarts were also operated by Sheffield and Glasgow.

In preparation for the 2008 Olympic Games, 3,000 of the internal combustion engine garbage trucks in Beijing were replaced with lithium ion polymer battery pack electric drive trucks. The batteries were procured for about $3,300 each. In France, some all-electric garbage trucks produced by Power Vehicle Innovation have been operating since 2011 in the city of Courbevoie, the first local authorities in France to acquire them.

In September 2014, an electric garbage truck, called the ERV (electric refuse vehicle), was deployed in the US city of Chicago. It was the first of an up to $13.4 million purchase order for up to 20 trucks. The PO was won in a competitive bid by Motiv Power Systems in 2012, but only one truck was ever delivered. Chicago sued Motive in 2019, alleging the truck was inoperable more than 60% of the time.

In Europe, as of 2020, electric garbage trucks have been ordered by Geneva, Basel, Frankfurt, Duisburg and other cities. Traditional garbage trucks have extremely high fuel consumption, higher than American 18 wheelers achieve on most routes. Using an electric drive instead of a diesel engine dramatically lowers energy consumption, yet it is still around 1,900 Wh/km or 3,060 Wh/mi. With a 340-kWh battery, such a truck can still achieve a range of over 177 km (110 miles) before it needs recharging.

=== Off-road and mining truck ===
Some attempts to produce such lorries have been made; for example, one by PapaBravo. Electric mining trucks have the benefit of not polluting underground. In the case of high-altitude mines, the downhill trip with ore recharges the batteries due to regenerative braking.

=== Solar assist ===
Solar panels on tractors typically support the HVAC system, or power devices used by the driver (hotel loads). Solar panels on trailers can be used for refrigeration batteries, for liftgate batteries, or for telematics. Small solar panels mounted on a refrigeration unit can serve as trickle chargers for the refrigeration unit's starting battery.

Heemskerk Dairy combines vehicle-integrated photovoltaics with electric forklifts, to ensure quiet operations that keep livestock relaxed.

In 2022, DHL announced that installation of solar panels on the roofs of 67 of its trucks would result in cost savings and a 100 kg/year reduction in carbon emissions per vehicle.

== Health benefits ==
Replacing heavy-duty diesel vehicles with electric alternatives is beneficial to public health as heavy-duty vehicles are responsible for a disproportionately large share of diesel emissions from the transportation sector. The presence of diesel exhaust in the air increases the risk of asthma, heart attacks and strokes, lung cancer, and early death. New vehicle emission standards are expected to reduce local pollution around 2030 partly by encouraging electric trucks, such as the Advanced Clean Trucks rule in some American states. In Europe rather than Euro 7 a CO_{2} standard may reduce local pollution.

== Retrofits ==
Some companies retrofits combustion trucks to electric, because it can be cheaper than buying a new electric one and brings the benefits of an all electric power train.

== Contributions ==
=== California ===
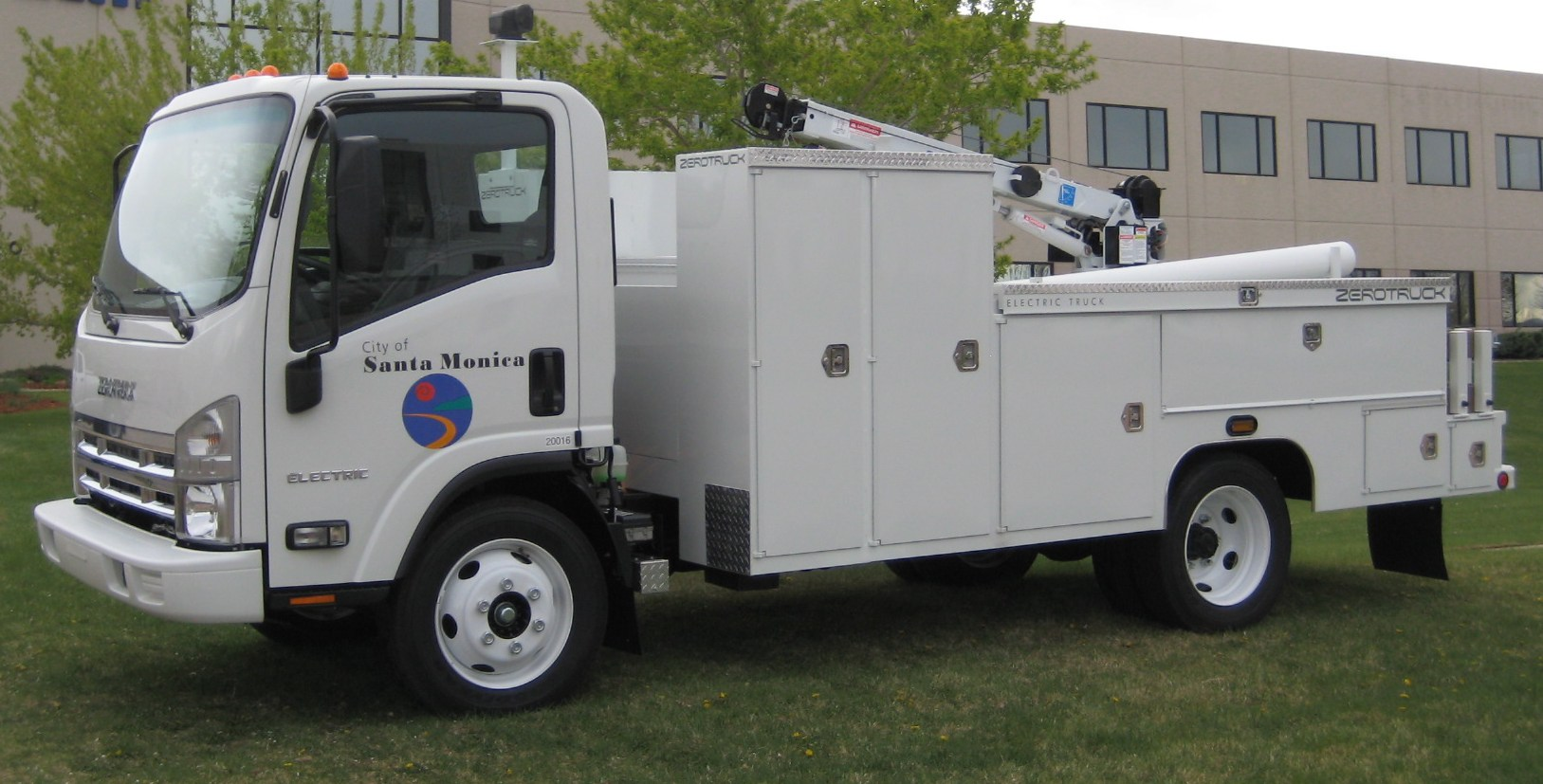
First zerotruck electric truck purchased by The City of Santa Monica, California.

In California, 70% of the smog pollution and 80% of carcinogenic diesel soot comes from the two million trucks out of 30 million registered in that state. As a remedy, California has decided to begin the clean truck standard. California has started its zero emission truck program in which they accelerate the production and deployment of electric trucks. At the end of 2021, California had 738 ZEV trucks, mostly battery powered.

An Electrified Charging Corridor Project, with 5 charging stations for medium and heavy EVs, will be completed by 2023. Chargers are already available at TEC Fontana and TEC La Mirada.

In 2023, the U.S. Environmental Protection Agency gave the legal authority to California to require that half of all heavy-duty truck sales be fully electric by 2035. By 2045, all trucks will have to be zero-emissions.

=== China ===
China has experienced rapid growth in electric heavy‑duty truck adoption, with sales rising 182% in 2025. Electric heavy trucks surpassed fossil fuel models in monthly sales for the first time in December 2025.

=== New Zealand ===
As of 2026, New Zealand’s transition to electric heavy vehicles has been slowed by high upfront costs, limited model availability, and the absence of dedicated public charging infrastructure for trucks.

Since 2021, full battery‑electric trucks have accounted for less than three percent of new heavy vehicle registrations, despite heavy vehicles producing about a fifth of the country’s transport emissions. Early adopters such as Waste Management have demonstrated operational benefits, reporting millions of electric kilometres travelled and substantial emissions reductions, but most heavy EVs in use remain custom conversions. Government co‑funding has supported a small number of battery‑electric, and a pilot programme has been launched to develop shared charging hubs. Operators have also highlighted regulatory barriers, particularly axle‑weight limits that restrict battery size or payload.

=== Norway ===
In 2024, 7.8% of all heavy trucks (those heavier than 16 tonnes) sold in Norway were all-electric (371 out of about 4775).

For light commercial vehicles (a category which includes light cargo vans) the market share of all-electrics was higher, at 30%.

=== Russian Federation ===
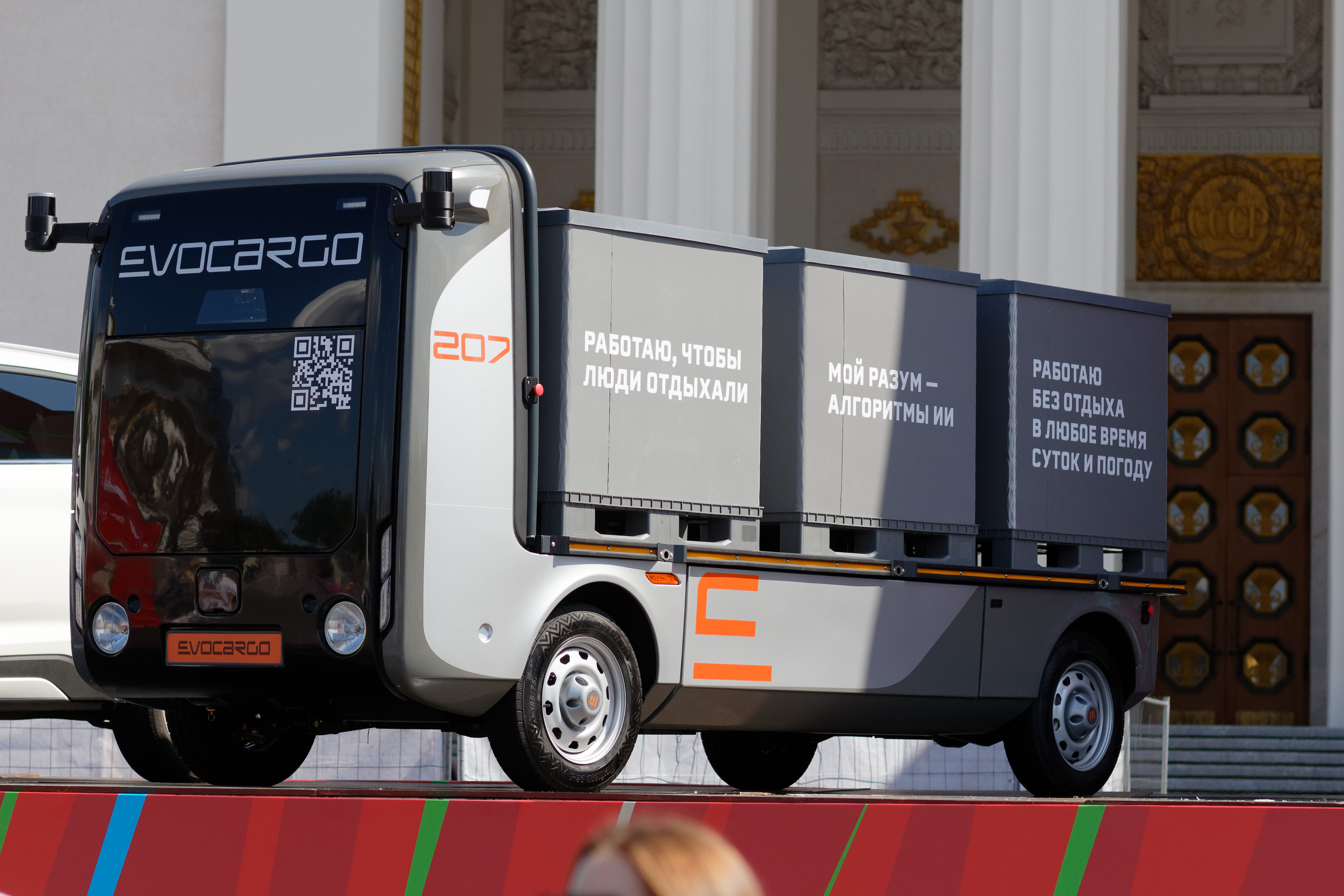
Evocargo N1

In Russia, Evocargo produces electric trucks.

=== Sweden ===
In 2024, 6.5% of all heavy trucks (those heavier than 16 tonnes) sold in Sweden were all-electric.

For light commercial vehicles (a category which includes light cargo vans) the market share of all-electrics was higher, at 22%.

=== South Korea ===
In South Korea, electric trucks hold a noticeable share of the new truck market; in 2020, among trucks produced and sold domestically (which are the vast majority of new trucks sold in the country), 7.6% were all-electric vehicles.

=== Vietnam ===
In Vietnam, the first 6 electric trucks for waste collection in Vietnam was launched in Hue City through the local People's Committee for a pilot scheme in May 2023. This pilot was supported by the United Nations Development Programme's "Catalyzing a Sustainable Shift Towards E-Mobility in Vietnam", which is supported by the government of Japan, through the Embassy of Japan in Vietnam.

== Incentives ==
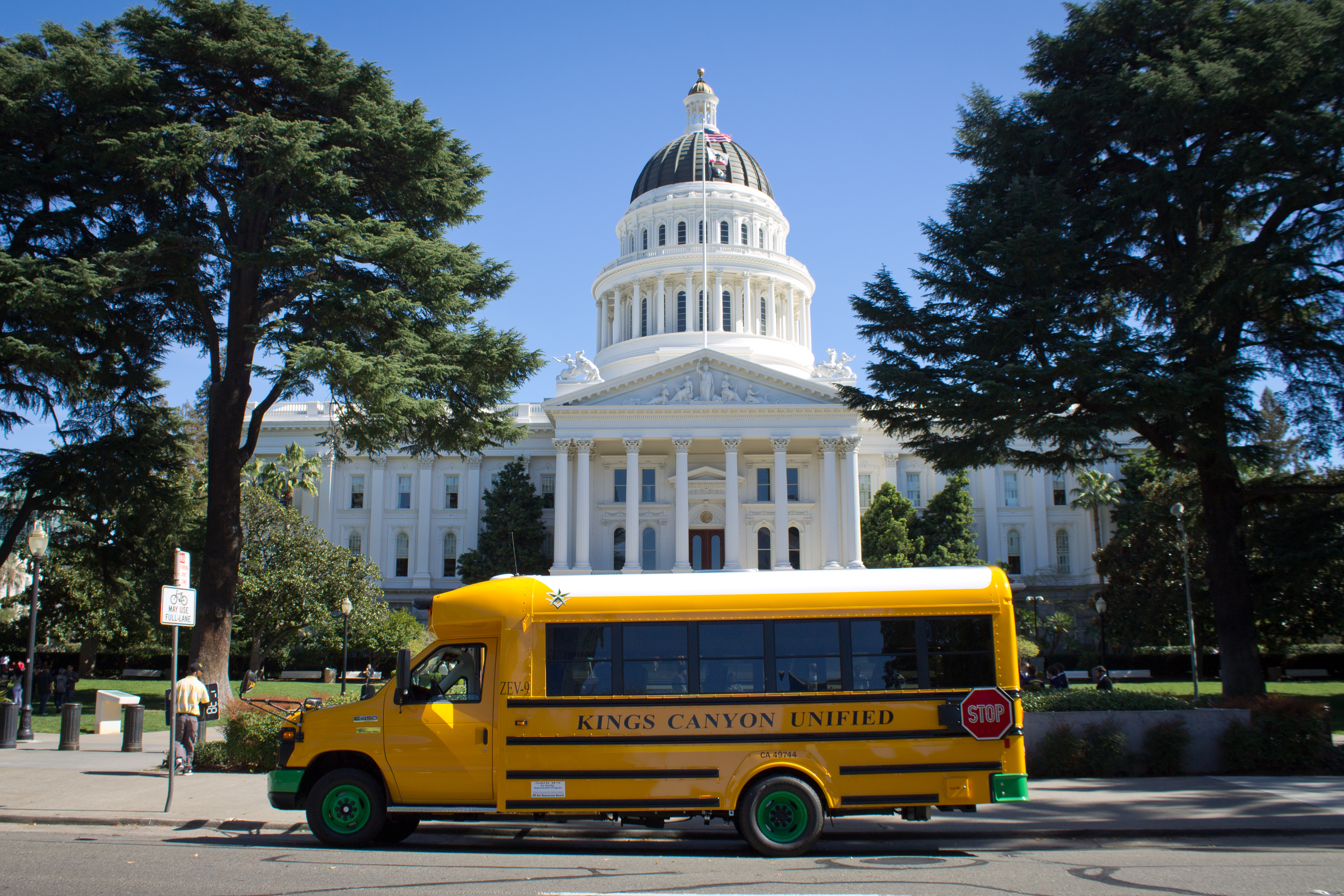
The first all-electric school bus in the state of California pausing outside the California capitol building in Sacramento.

Launched by the California Air Resources Board in 2009, the California Hybrid and Zero-Emission Truck and Bus Voucher Incentive Project (HVIP for short) is part of California Climate Investments.

== See also ==
- Battery electric bus – Electric bus which obtains energy from on-board batteries
- Battery electric vehicle – Type of electric vehicle
- CalCars – US non-profit organization
- CarGoTram – Former VW factory parts supply tram in Dresden, Germany
- Charging station – Installation for charging electric vehicles
- E-FORCE ONE – Battery propelled freight motor vehicle
- Electric bus – Bus powered by electricity
- Electric van – Vehicle propelled fully or mostly by electricity
- Electric vehicle conversion – Process of converting a vehicle to use electric propulsion
- Ground support equipment – Equipment for servicing aircraft between flights
- Hybrid electric truck
- Modec – UK electric vehicle manufacturer
- North American Council for Freight Efficiency – Global clean energy non-profit organization
- Smith Electric Vehicles – Electric truck manufacturer (1920–2017)
- Solar-charged vehicle – Electric vehicle powered by solar energy
- Trolleytruck – Electric truck taking power from overhead wires
- VIA Motors – American EV company
- Volta Trucks – Electric truck company
- Wrightspeed
