= Volta Trucks =

Electric truck company

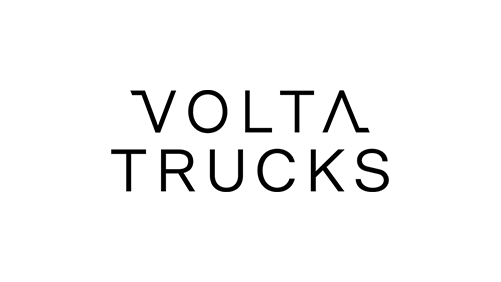
- Type: Private
- Industry: Electric Vehicles, Automotive, Technology
- Founded: 2019; 7 years ago
- Founder: Carl-Magnus Norden; Kjell Waloen
- Defunct: 17 October 2023
- Headquarters: Stockholm, Sweden
- Key people: Essa Al-Saleh, CEO
- Products: Electric trucks
- Number of employees: 885
- Website: www.voltatrucks.com

Founded in 2019, Volta Trucks manufactures and provides services for electric trucks. The company's registered offices are Stockholm, Sweden, and London, UK, with operations in both countries as well as France, Spain, The Netherlands, and Austria. Volta Trucks’ Head Office is in Stockholm, Sweden, with its engineering led from the UK, and manufacturing facility in Steyr, Austria.

In September 2020, Volta Trucks launched the Volta Zero, an all-electric, 16-tonne vehicle for city-centre freight deliveries. The first demonstrator was designed by Astheimer in Warwick, UK, and manufactured by Prodrive Advanced Engineering in Banbury, UK.

In total, Volta Trucks has raised over €360 million funding to date. A New York-based investment firm, Luxor Capital led the funding round and represents the company's largest single investor, joining previous lead investor, Stockholm-based Byggmästare Anders J Ahlström. In April 2022, Volta Trucks had an order bank of around 6,000 vehicles with a value of circa $1.3billion. Volta trucks filed for bankruptcy in Sweden 17 of October 2023, and then was bought up by hedge fund Luxor Capital Group, one of its largest creditors.

== History ==
2019

Volta Trucks was founded in 2019 by Scandinavian entrepreneur Carl-Magnus Norden and co-founder Kjell Waloen. Engineering, concepting, and product validation took place throughout 2019.

2019 - 2020

Work on the first demonstration vehicle started in 2019 and was completed in 2020. In June 2020, Volta Trucks confirmed the first pilot fleet of the Volta Zero would be undertaken by Posten Bring, a Nordic distributor of parcels, cargo, and mail.

In December 2020 Volta Trucks announced a strategic partnership with Petit Forestier with a 1,000-vehicle order of all-electric, refrigerated vehicles. This order is believed to be Europe's single largest order of large electric commercial vehicles.

2021

In February 2021 Volta Trucks announced that US EV technology company, Proterra, would be the supplier for the Volta Zero's batteries. Additionally, the company also confirmed the appointment of Meritor as the supplier for the Volta Zero's drivetrain component. Other partnerships with global Tier One suppliers announced included Bridgestone as the supplier for the Volta Zero's tires, and Carrier Transicold as the supplier of the refrigerated equipment, and Paneltex as the supplier of Volta Zero's Cargo Boxes.

In April 2021, Volta Trucks announced the appointment of its new chief executive officer and executive chairman Essa Al-Saleh, former president and CEO of Agility Logistics, and former chairman of the board of directors of Volta Trucks. Concurrently, Carl-Magnus Norden, the company's founder, was appointed as executive chairman of the company's board of directors.

In June 2021, Volta Trucks confirmed the start of engineering evaluation and development testing of the first prototype Volta Zero at HORIBA MIRA in Nuneaton, UK.

In September 2021, Volta Trucks confirmed that the first Volta Zero vehicles will be manufactured in by Steyr Automotive at their factory in Steyr, Austria. Additionally, the company announced the conclusion of its Series B funding round which secured €37 million in new capital. Furthermore, Adam Chassin, former head of business for Uber in Europe and the former head of strategic business development for Amazon, joined Volta Trucks as its new chief commercial officer.

In November 2021, DB Schenker confirmed an order of almost 1,500 Volta Zero vehicles.

In December 2021, the first road-going, Volta Zero Design Verification prototype was completed.

2022

In May 2022, Volta Trucks confirmed its entry strategy for products, services, and manufacturing for the North American market. The plan will see the first Volta Zero vehicles operating in Los Angeles by the end of 2023 by introducing a ‘Pilot Fleet’ of 100 Class 7 trucks in mid-2023. This fleet will be evaluated by US customers, before a scaling up of production for US Volta Trucks in 2024.

In June 2022, Volta Trucks announced the production of its first Volta Zero vehicle at its manufacturing facility in Steyr, Austria. Series production of customer specification vehicles is due to start in early 2023.

In October 2022 the company announced that it had signed a letter of intent with Siemens Smart Infrastructure outlining a cooperation to deliver eMobility charging infrastructure and software to Volta Trucks customers.

Volta Trucks also confirmed the location of its first Volta Trucks Hub in the UK, on White Hart Lane in Tottenham, north London. The facility covers 30,000 sq feet, operating eight workshop bays. The property, managed by LaSalle Investment Management, has a photovoltaic panel system on its roof, converting sunlight into energy for the site, and a passive solar wall, optimising the heating and ventilation of the building. It is also designed with a charging infrastructure to support 50 kW fast charging of Volta Zero vehicles while they are being maintained. Overall, the facility has an A+ EPC rating and has been designed to achieve the BREAAM ‘Excellent’ rating.

In November 2022, Karl Viktor Schaller is appointed to the board of directors. Between 2014 and 2019, Karl Viktor Schaller was executive vice president, motorcycle engineering with BMW AG.

2023

Volta Trucks announced the appointment of Claes Nilsson to its board of directors in early January 2023. Claes Nilsson has previously worked for AB Volvo, where he held the position of president of Volvo Trucks and member of its executive board.

The company also confirmed customer production orders for the first 300 manufacturing slots of its full-electric Volta Zero, with an associated revenue of more than €85 million.

Volta trucks filed for bankruptcy in Sweden 17 of October 2023, but was almost immediately bought out of administration by Luxor Capital Partners, a hedge fund that had been one of its main financers. The UK site was closed and 600 staff lost their jobs. The business is expected to continue as a going concern once a new battery supply is agreed.

2024

The company, that is, its successors after the bankruptcy that still call themselves Volta (numerous connected companies in numerous countries), continues to operate in 2024. The main product (still under development, not in manufacture stage yet) of the company remains the Volta Zero. The founder, Carl Magnus Norden, went on to start Decade Energy which raised €3.6 million in seed funding to accelerate the decarbonisation of logistics fleets.

== The Volta Zero ==
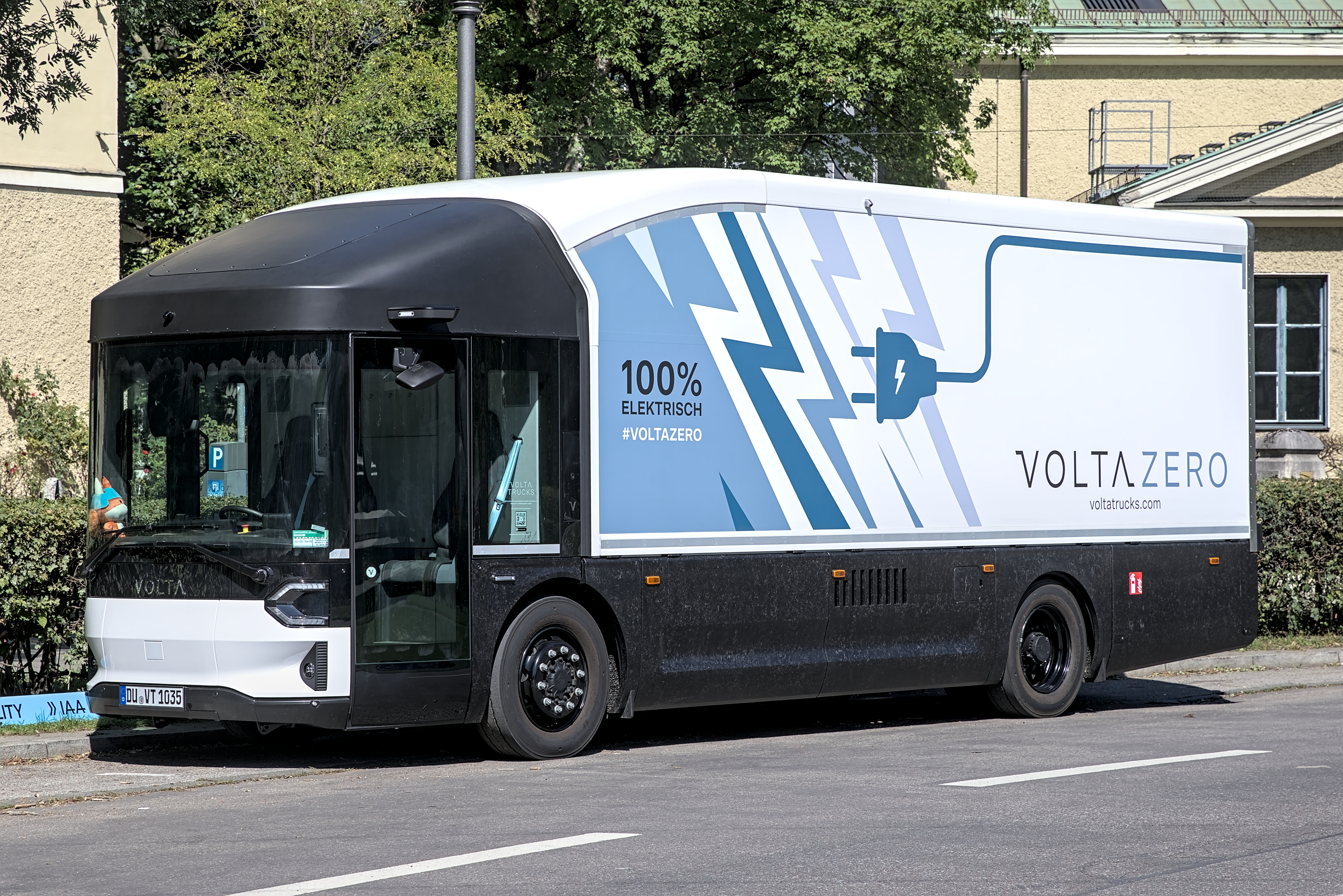
Volta Zero

In September 2020, Volta Trucks launched the 16-tonne Volta Zero, the world's first purpose-built, all-electric commercial vehicle designed for city-centre deliveries. The driver sits in a central driving position in a lowered cab to mirror the eyeline of other road users and pedestrians. Symmetrical sliding doors allow access in-and-out of either side of the cab. A glasshouse-style cab provides the driver with a 220 degree field of vision and has been designed to exceed the highest Direct Vision Standard rating of 5 stars by Transport for London. The Volta Zero is fitted with 160-200kWh batteries delivering a range of up to 200 km. Volta Trucks claim that the Volta Zero will have a Total Cost of Ownership (TCO) that is less than the cost the same as petrol and diesel equivalents.

Volta Trucks launched the 16-tonne Volta Zero in September 2020, and confirmed in the same month that Nobl (formally Drinks Cubed), the London-based sustainable drinks brand, had signed the first multi-million-pound order for the supply of a fleet of Volta Zero vehicles into their distribution operations between 2022 and 2023.

In April 2022, Volta Trucks revealed the design of the 7.5- and 12-tonne variants, which bear a close visual relationship to the larger 16-tonne vehicle. The 7.5 and 12-tonne variants will be visually identical at the front, with the 12-tonne vehicle having a longer chassis and body, and second set of rear wheels and tyres, to accommodate the increased vehicle payload.

Battery capacity 150/164 kWh (usable/gross) standard range, 225/246 kWh (usable/gross) long range. As of mid-2023 refrigerated models only come with long range battery.

== Truck as a Service ==
In April 2022, Volta Trucks revealed its first ‘Volta Trucks Hub’ which will be in Bonneuil-sur-Marne, Paris. The hub will carry out routine servicing of vehicles. A further was announced Tottenham, London in late 2022 with two more in Madrid, Spain and Duisburg, Germany in March 2023.
