= BYD 8TT =

All-electric Class 8 semi-trailer truck

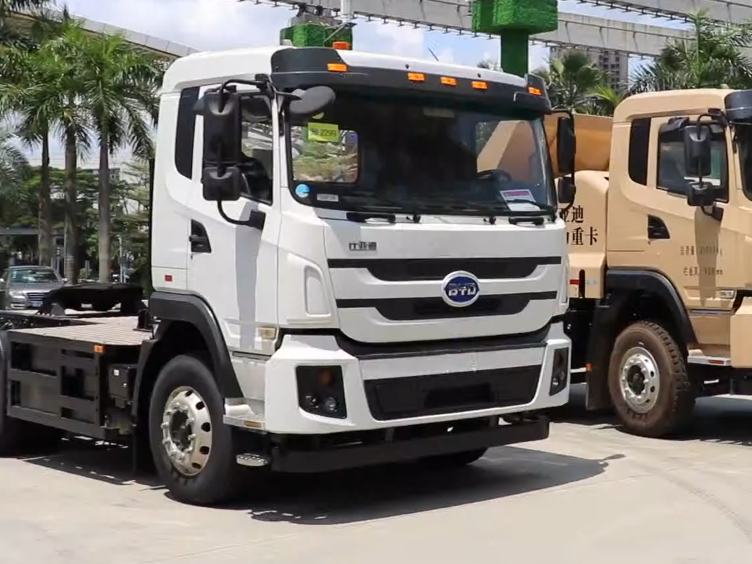
- A white BYD 8TT electric truck

Overview
- Manufacturer: BYD Auto
- Model years: 2018-present

Body and chassis
- Class: Class 8 heavy-duty truck
- Body style: Tractor unit for semi-trailer

Powertrain
- Electric motor: 360 kW (483 hp), 2,400 N⋅m (1,770 lb⋅ft)
- Battery: 422 or 563 kWh
- Plug-in charging: 185 kW DC CCS1

Dimensions
- Curb weight: 47,600 kg (105,000 lb) GCWR

The BYD 8TT is an all-electric, heavy duty (Class 8) semi-truck sold by BYD Auto in the United States, China and other markets.

== Design ==
The battery used in the 8TT has more than 400 kWh of capacity, which according to the manufacturer translates into an all-electric range of 200 km (124 mi) at full load or 270 km (167 mi) at half load. The vehicle's GCWR is 48 t (105,000 lb).

These figures are for the second (current) generation of the 8TT.

== Users ==
Anheuser-Busch announced they will deploy 21 of these trucks on California roads.

Also in California, GSC Logistics uses three BYD 8TT trucks, while Golden State Express operates two.

In early 2020, BYD announced it delivered its 100th electric truck in the United States, and more than 12,000 electric trucks worldwide, although these statistics also include other models, not only the 8TT.

== Other electric trucks by BYD ==
Besides the 8TT Class 8 semi-truck, BYD offers a wide range of all-electric trucks, including the T10, which is a Class 8 chassis truck that can be equipped with many different superstructures (available with a 324 kWh battery); the T8, which is also a Class 8 chassis truck; Class 6 trucks; and lighter commercial vehicles.

Just like the 8TT, these are not prototypes or upcoming models, but existing vehicles sold to, and used by, municipal/local government entities and private customers.
