= Ford Ranger EV =

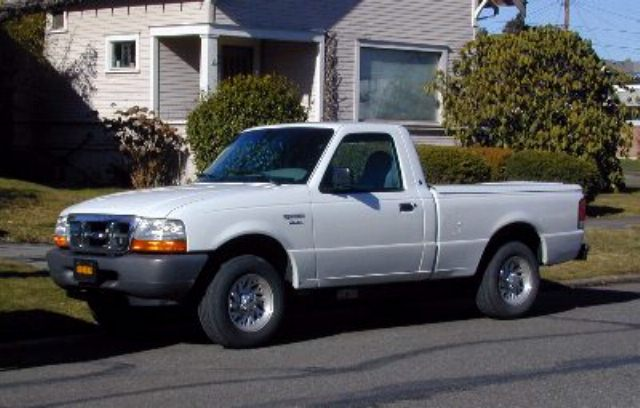
- Ford Ranger EV

Overview
- Manufacturer: Ford
- Production: 1997–2002
- Model years: 1998–2002
- Assembly: United States: Edison, New Jersey Edison_Assembly

Body and chassis
- Class: Compact pickup truck
- Body style: 2-door regular cab
- Layout: Rear-motor, rear-wheel-drive
- Related: Ford Ranger (third generation); Ford Explorer (third generation)

Powertrain
- Electric motor: Siemens Type 1 (1PV5133-4WS20 W11) three-phase AC induction motor 90 hp (67 kW), 149 ft⋅lb (202 N⋅m)
- Transmission: 3:1 single speed reduction integrated with motor and differential
- Battery: 22 kWh lead-acid or 28.5 kWh NiMH
- Plug-in charging: SAE J1773-1998 (Avcon) connector

Dimensions
- Wheelbase: 111.6 in (2,830 mm)
- Length: 187.5 in (4,760 mm)
- Width: 69.4 in (1,760 mm)
- Height: 66 in (1,700 mm)
- Curb weight: 4,196–4,700 lb (1,903–2,132 kg)

The Ford Ranger EV is a battery electric compact pickup truck that was produced by the Ford Motor Company and was the automaker's first all-electric production vehicle. It was produced starting in the 1998 model year through 2002 and is no longer in production. It is built upon a light truck chassis used in the Ford Explorer. Most vehicles were sold with nickel–metal hydride batteries (NiMH). A few vehicles with lead-acid batteries were sold, but most units were leased for fleet use.

As of 2022, an active owner's community continues to maintain and upgrade these trucks.

== History ==
=== Cost ===
The above the line cost of this vehicle (before manufacturer discounts and other public agency subsidies) was US$52,720 (equivalent to $105,735 in 2025). Ford Motor Credit supported a generous 3-year lease program that would, along with AQMD (Air Quality Management District) funding and Federal Tax Credits, allow for a RangerEV 3-year lease payment as low as US$155 (equivalent to $310.87 in 2025) per month.

An example is the Lawrence Livermore/Berkeley Labs, in eco-friendly Northern California, signed on for 20 units from Ford Motor Credit, with a total lease cost to the Labs of $0 over the 3-year lease term. Thanks to overwhelming financial support from government-funded Clean Cities programs and AQMD Grants, when applied towards an APP (All Payments Paid) version of the RangerEV commercial lease the resulting lease became Paid In Full.

The Ranger EV qualified for a California Clean Air Vehicle decal, permitting the use of carpool lanes for single-occupant vehicles through 2018.

== Design ==
The Ranger EV was essentially a Ford Ranger XL 4x2 regular cab featuring an electric vehicle powertrain instead of the Ranger XL's standard I4 engine. The only difference between a Ranger XL and a Ranger EV was that the Ranger EV had no engine, so the tachometer that was on the Ranger XL was replaced by an estimated range remaining gauge on the Ranger EV, the oil pressure gauge was also replaced with an On/Off indicator, and the voltage gauge was replaced with an economy gauge. Other than these minor differences, the Ranger EV included the standard features that the Ranger XL 4X2 Regular Cab included as standard: an AM and FM radio, two speakers, fifteen-inch alloy wheels, a bench seat or bucket seats trimmed in cloth, air conditioning and a heater, an automatic transmission, two airbags, seating for either two or three passengers, a passenger airbag on/off switch activated by the vehicle's ignition and door key, and vinyl flooring. Additional options, such as a spare tire, a cassette and/or CD player, two additional speakers behind the front seats, power windows and door locks, and keyless entry were also available for all Ranger EVs. Most Ranger EVs were painted in Ford's standard Oxford White Clear Coat with a Flint Gray interior; other exterior colors included: Bright Red, Medium Platinum, Light Denim Blue Metallic, Boysenberry Blue Metallic, and Pacific Green Metallic. No other interior color options were available.

=== Exterior ===
The principal identifiers of an electric Ranger are the appearance of the front charging door in a grille location that is open on ICE (Internal Combustion Engine) Rangers, the missing tailpipe, and the visibility of the EV's unique rear suspension and the traction motor from behind the vehicle. From the side, the vehicle is almost indistinguishable from the ICE Ranger except for a modest script Electric on the side. Only the slight projection of the battery tray below the frame rails is noticeable at a distance. Vehicle height is close to that of four-wheel drive vehicles despite being only rear-wheel drive, due to the vehicle being built on a 4WD frame, and utilization of the heavier duty 4WD front torsion bar suspension.

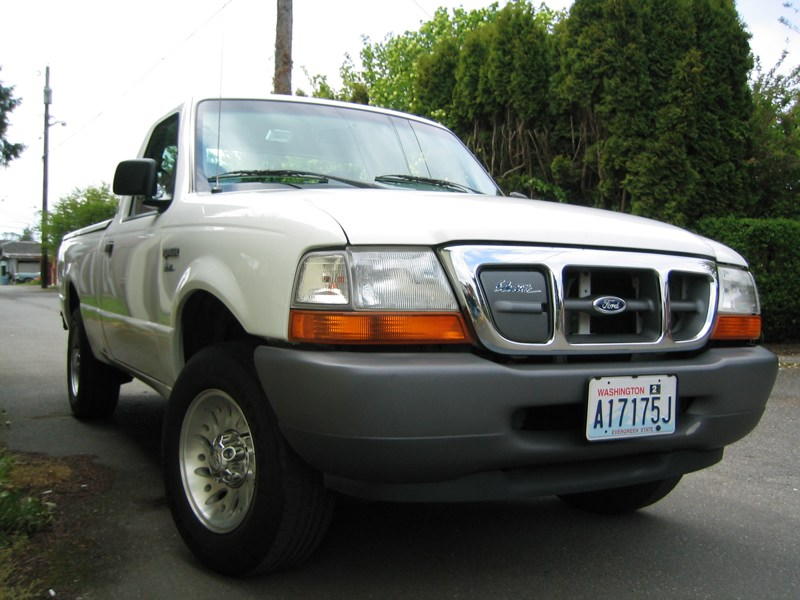
Charge door in grille distinguishes the EV from the front

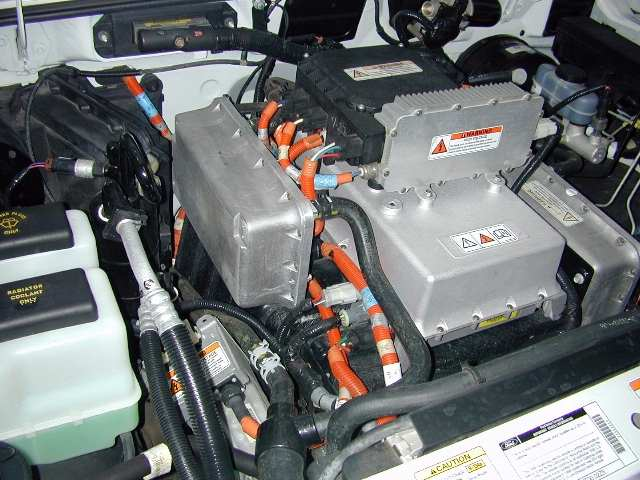
Under the hood

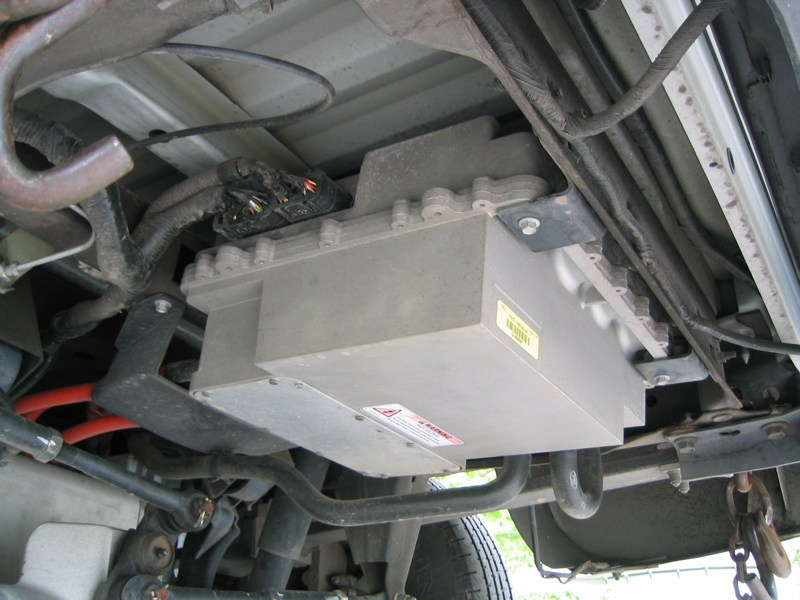
Power controller under bed at rear

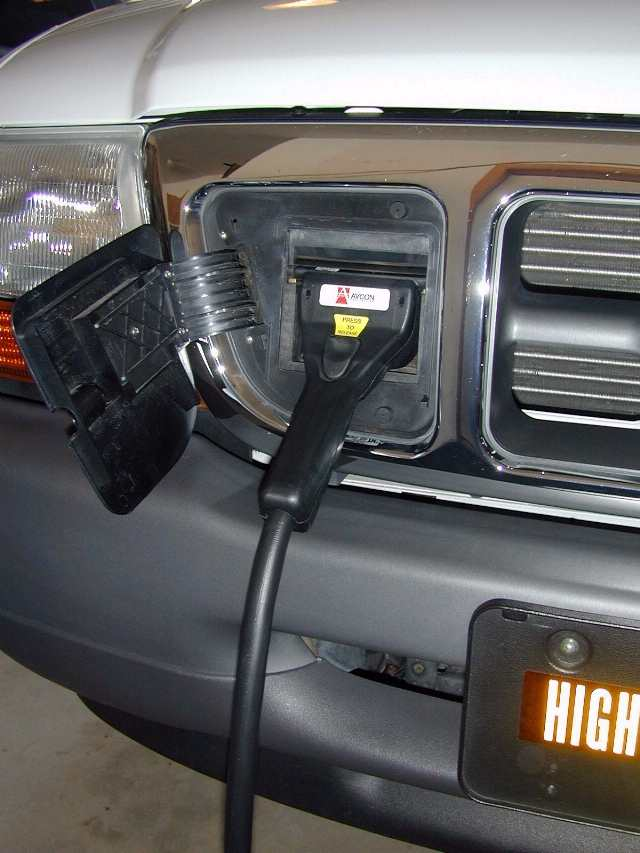
Charging

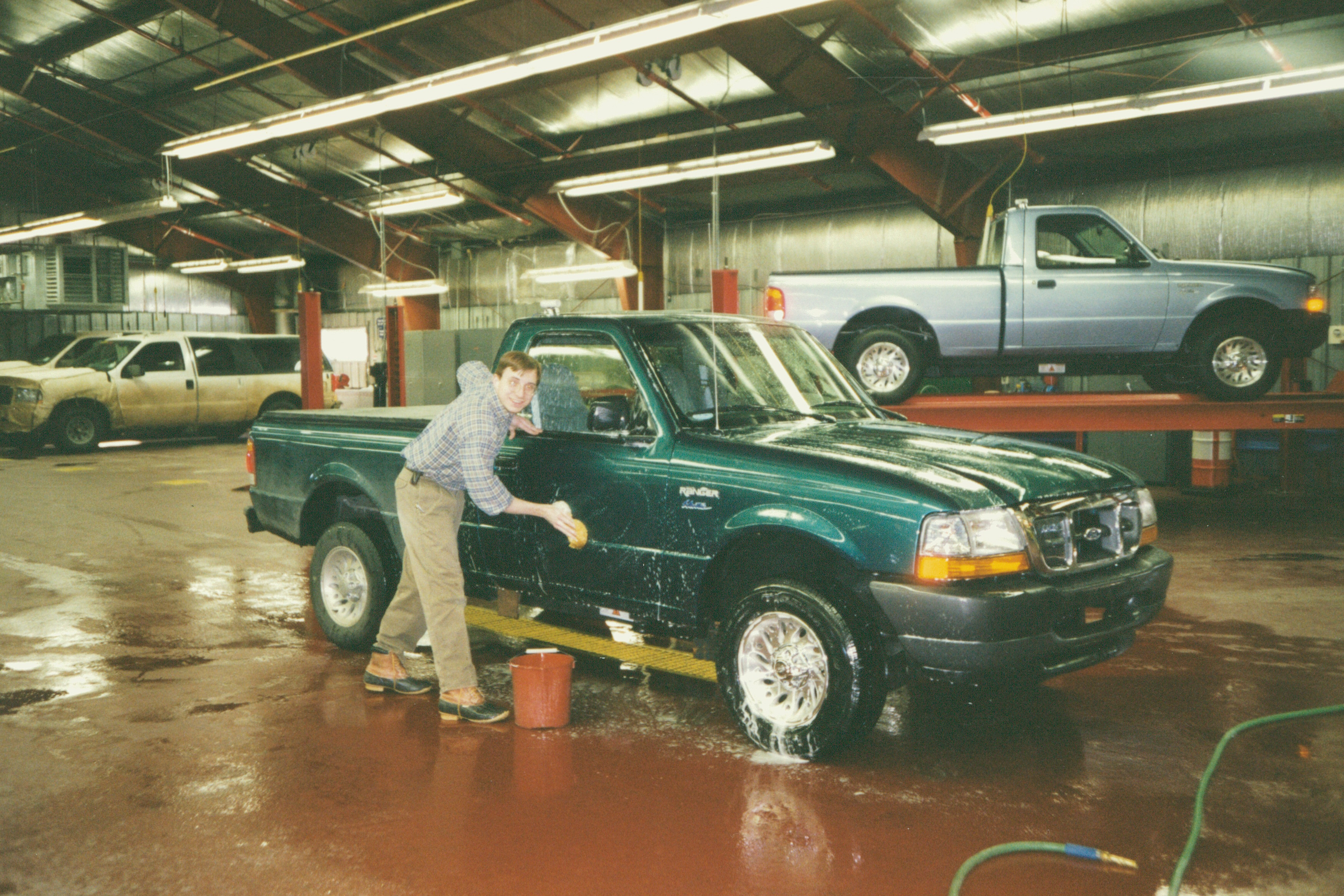
Prototype vehicles and a Ford "wash boy" at the Ford Bemidji Test Center, Bemidji, Minnesota USA.

==== Component layout ====
The front under hood compartment contains the charger, an electric air conditioner, the power steering mechanism, the power brake unit (otherwise conventional), a radiator for the air conditioner, and a vacuum pump and reservoir for the power brakes, a reservoir for the windshield washer, and a reservoir for the motor/inverter coolant. To the rear of the rear axle (the usual location for the spare tire) is the AC motor controller. The spare tire could be secured by a hold down within the truck bed, apparently on the centerline approximately 30 inches from the cab wall. it was not possible to carry both a spare tire at this location and cargo in this central space.

==== Bed cover ====
To improve aerodynamics, the bed is covered by a vinyl snap on cover supported by aluminum bows. Snap receivers slide within aluminum channels. A rear bow allows the tailgate to be opened without removing the cover. The cover can be quite difficult to re-snap under cold conditions due to shrinkage and stiffness of the vinyl material. The unmodified cargo bed was compatible with after-market tonneau covers produced for gasoline engine models.

=== Interior ===
==== Instruments ====
Instrument panel

From left to right, the instruments are:

- A charge indicator in the lower left corner, in the place of the normal fuel gauge.
- A rate indicator in the upper left corner, showing energy usage and recovery.
- A miles to go indicator, replacing the tachometer.
- An 80 mph (130 km/h) speedometer with odometer in place of the ICE's 120 mph (190 km/h) speedometer.
- At the upper right corner, an off-run electric gauge will come up to the run position in a few seconds after Start is commanded by a key switch turn. This does not indicate the pack voltage; it is only an indication to the driver that the vehicle is enabled (has been started). The vehicle's main contacts will not close until the pre-charge is complete.
- At the lower right corner, a temperature gauge monitors the liquid coolant temperature.

Various indicator lights are included, one of which indicates that the truck is plugged in for charging. This is interlocked with the start circuit, disabling it if the charging connector is inserted.

==== Controls ====
Ford attempted to make the driving and operating experience as similar as possible to that experienced in an ICE vehicle with an automatic transmission. A column shifter style selector operates similar to that for an automatic transmission with the following positions: P for park, R for reverse, N for neutral, D for drive, and E for economy. (The economy position reduces the maximum speed and engages regenerative braking).

A conventional switch arrangement is used to provide key inserted detection at Off, Accessory, Run, and Start. Other controls are identical to that of the ICE version.

The heating system uses a ceramic core resistance heater. Air conditioning is provided with an electric-motor driven compressor-condenser-evaporator system.

=== Chassis ===
The Ford Ranger EV was built upon a Ford Ranger four-wheel drive chassis.

==== Front suspension ====
Dual A arm with torsion bar suspension, since 4wd frames are used for the Ford Ranger EV.

==== Rear suspension ====
The rear suspension consists of a De Dion tube that located the wheels and which was sprung by the usual longitudinal leaf springs. The first year of production (1998) used lightweight carbon fiber monolithic leaf springs which had insufficient lateral stiffness to provide lateral location of the suspension; these early versions also featured a Watt's linkage. Later versions used conventional steel leaf springs and did not have the Watt's linkage.

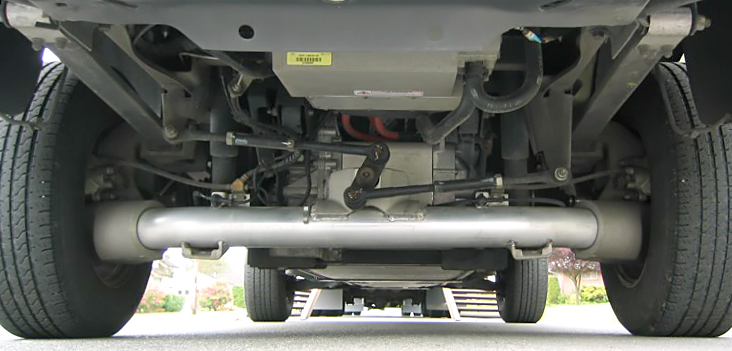
In the 1998 model, carbon fiber leaf springs support a DeDion tube located by a Watt's linkage, motor/transmission is attached to chassis. Later versions have similar appearance but without the linkage

==== Driveline ====
The rear wheels are powered by a six pole alternating current motor operating through a (single speed) three to one reduction transmission and differential. The motor can produce 90 hp (67 kW) and can operate at a maximum speed of 13,000 rpm. The motor, transmission, and differential are contained in a single unit mounted high between the frame rails, transversely between the rear wheels. Half shafts angle downward to drive the wheels.

==== Tires and wheels ====
All wheels including the spare are made of cast aluminum. Tires are low rolling resistance, similar to what would be found on a full-size sedan, rather than on a truck. 1998 and 1999 wheels were of the same, simple design. Later models had wheels of a large 'spoke' design.

=== Performance ===
Idaho National Engineering Laboratory, Advanced Vehicle Testing Results
		1998 (lead-acid)		1999 (NiMH)	
Acceleration 0–50 mph (80 km/h)	At 100% SOC	11.6 sec		10.3 sec	
Acceleration 0–50 mph (80 km/h)	At 50% SOC	12.3 sec		11.2 sec	
Acceleration 0–50 mph (80 km/h)	Max Power	87.4 kW		84.13 kW	
Acceleration 0–50 mph (80 km/h)	Performance Goal	13.5 sec at 50% SOC			
Maximum speed at 50% SOC	At 1/4 mi (0.40 km)	61.6 mi/h 99.1 km/h		62.1 mi/h 99.9 km/h	
Maximum speed at 50% SOC	At 1 mi (1.6 km)	74.5 mi/h 119.9 km/h		74.6 mi/h 120.1 km/h	
Maximum speed at 50% SOC	Performance Goal	70 mi/h (110 km/h) in 1 mi (1.6 km)			
Constant speed range (Note: Testing was terminated upon illumination of the Power Limit light)		At 45 mi/h 72 km/h	At 60 mi/h 97 km/h	At 45 mi/h 72 km/h	At 60 mi/h 97 km/h
Constant speed range	Range	86.9 mi 139.9 km	57.9 mi 93.2 km	115.0 mi 185.1 km	74.2 mi 119.4 km
Constant speed range	Energy used	20.63 kWh	20.60 kWh	27.81 kWh	26.83 kWh
Constant speed range	Average power	10.71 kW	21.41 kW	10.94 kW	21.52 kW
Constant speed range	Efficiency	237 Wh/mile	356 Wh/mile	242 Wh/mile	362 Wh/mile
Constant speed range	Specific energy	23.7 Wh/kg	23.7 Wh/kg	57.3 Wh/kg	55.3 Wh/kg
Driving cycle range	Range (Note: per SAE J1634)	65.1 mi (104.8 km)		82.4 mi (132.6 km)	
Driving cycle range	Energy used	21.96 kWh		25.95 kWh	
Driving cycle range	Average power	9.54 kW		8.32 kW	
Driving cycle range	Efficiency	337 Wh/mile		315 Wh/mile	
Driving cycle range	Specific energy	25.2 Wh/kg		53.5 Wh/kg	
Driving cycle range	Performance Goal	60 mi (97 km)			

==== Energy recovery ====
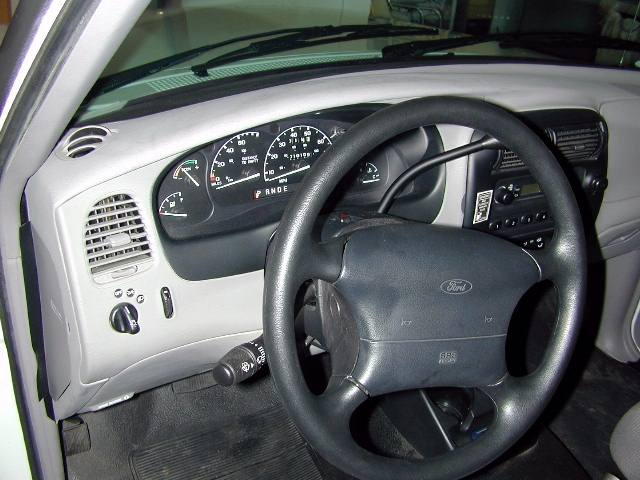
Cab view

On a very long downhill run one could obtain a noticeably higher state of charge than at the top (3,000 ft (910 m) elevation difference), so the energy recovery was demonstrably effective.

==== Economy ====
Power consumption for light duty suburban use is around 500 watt-hours per mile, both by the EPA figures for early models and by some owners' experience. The Ford Ranger EV controller electronics will allow strong acceleration even when in 'E' economy shifter mode. Thus a heavy foot will reduce the EV's range.

=== Battery ===
Batteries are contained in one big battery box that is bolted to the underside of the vehicle. It can be removed using specialized shop equipment. Individual batteries are then serviced and replaced from the open top of the module. The battery layout inside the box is not the same for the Lead-Acid and NiMH battery type. The Lead-Acid setup is using 39 x 8V batteries setup on two layers. The NiMH setup is using 25 x 12V batteries on one layer.

==== Lead-acid variants ====
The lead-acid battery pack consisted of 39 valve-regulated lead-acid modules assembled by East Penn Manufacturing for Delphi, with a weight of 870.1 kg (1,918 lb), a nominal system voltage of 312 V, and a nominal capacity (to half of the fully charged capacity) of 60 Ah.

==== Nickel metal hydride variants ====
In California and some limited areas outside of California, a nickel–metal hydride battery (NiMH) version was offered, originally exclusively for lease. NiMH pack consists of 25 Panasonic EV-M95, 12.00 Volt, Nickel-Metal Hydride batteries. NiMH pack voltage range Empty 280Vdc – Full 350Vdc. The NiMH battery pack consisted of 25 modules from Motorcraft (Panasonic OEM), with a weight of 485 kg (1,069 lb), a nominal system voltage of 300 V, and a nominal capacity (to one-third of the fully charged capacity) of 95 Ah.

The NiMH version delivered a true 65-mile (105 km) range at a steady 65 mph (105 km/h) speed on flat highways (normal operation with some reserve; in comparison the lead-acid version which is said to have a range of up to 65 miles (105 km) with hard tires and careful driving. Actual range of the lead-acid Ford Ranger EV is less).

==== Charging ====
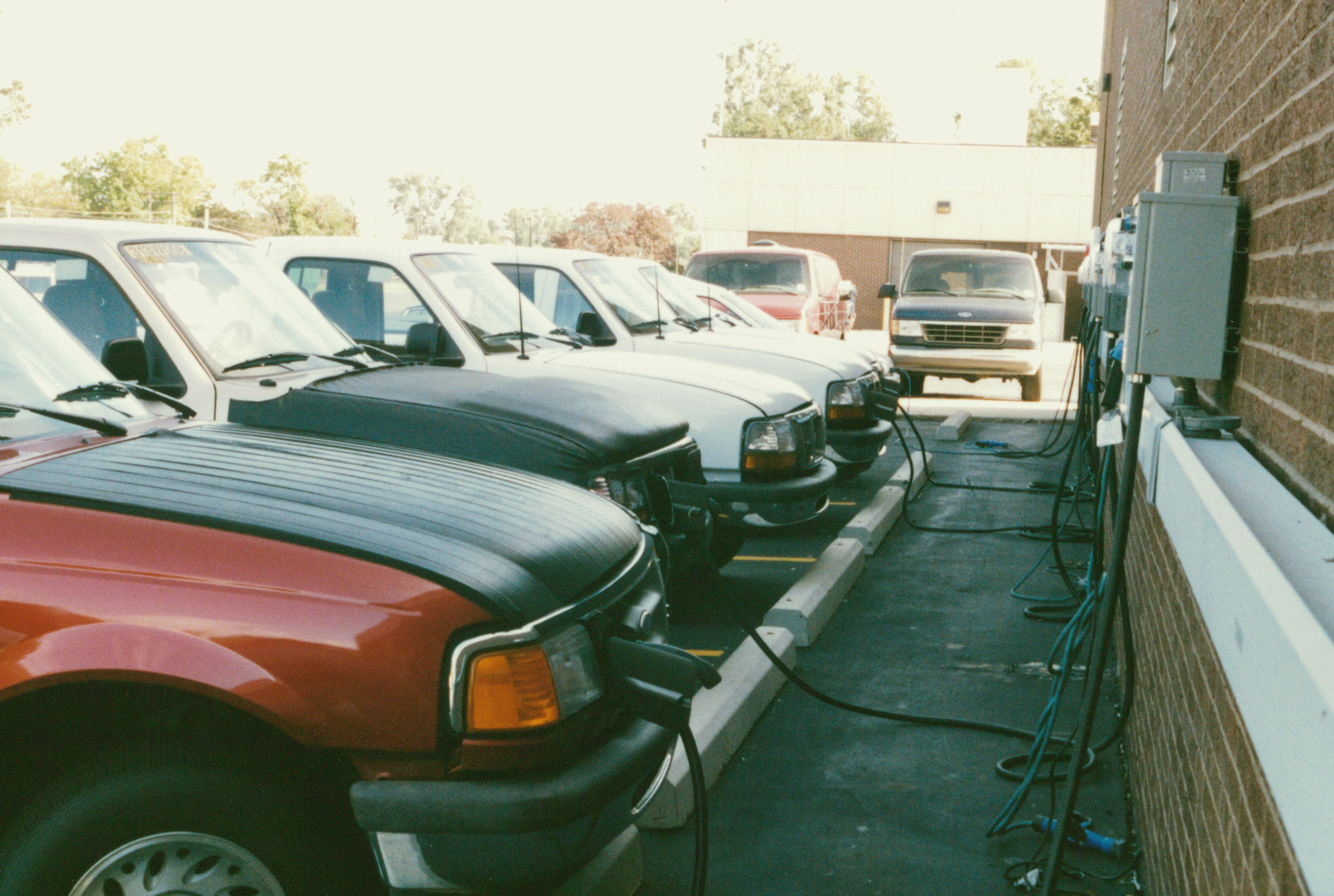
Ford Ranger EV prototype test vehicles being charged at Ford's Electric Vehicle Center on Commerce Drive, Dearborn, Michigan USA.

Charging is through an Avcon conductive connector, provided beneath a hinged door to the right side of the grille. A NiMH pack would take six to eight hours to charge, storing about 30 kW·h, and the charging and discharging is regulated through passive control devices.

The Avcon connector was compliant to the then-current SAE J1772-1998 conductive charging standard. It is possible to use either an adapter or to upgrade the plug on the truck to the updated J1772-2010 standard. The two connectors use an identical signaling and wiring scheme with ground, two hots, proximity and pilot. With an adapter or after an upgrade, Ranger EVs can use the newer public charging infrastructure being deployed nationwide that utilizes the new J1772-2010 standard.

==== Thermal management ====
The power electronics such as the motor, motor controller, AC motor controller, and high voltage DC-DC converter are liquid-cooled. The batteries and battery charger are air-cooled.

=== Development ===
Although destined to be a low-volume product, the Ranger EV was put though Ford's rigorous passenger truck durability testing regimen prior to production release to ensure it would meet Ford's quality standard. This entailed extreme hot- and cold-weather testing, as well as vibration, corrosion durability, and a host of other tests intended to simulate 10 years or 150K miles of use.

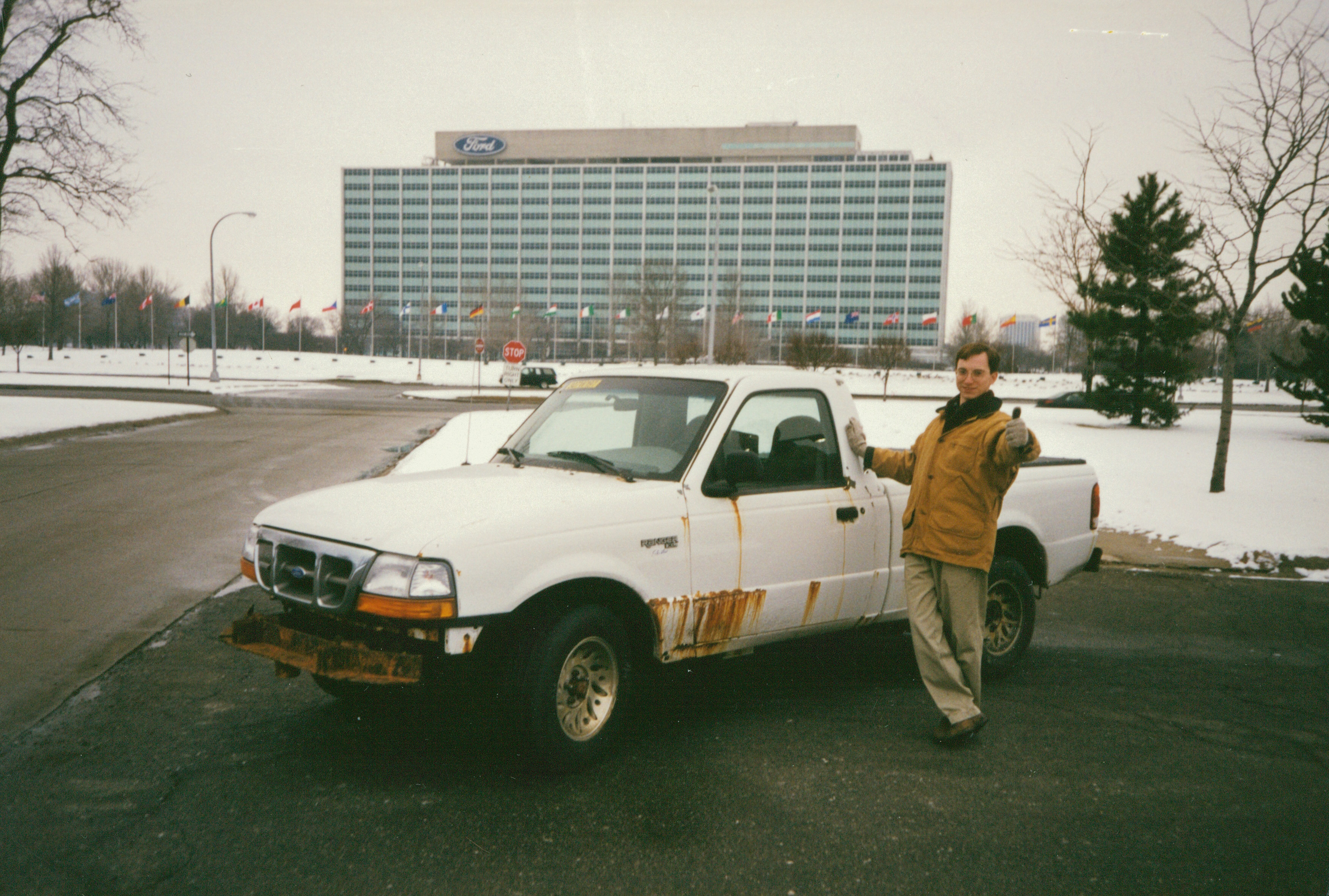
Prototype test vehicle in Dearborn, Michigan USA after rigorous Corrosion Durability Testing at the Ford AZ Proving Grounds, Yucca, Arizona USA. A production Ranger EV was later run though this test without a single failure.

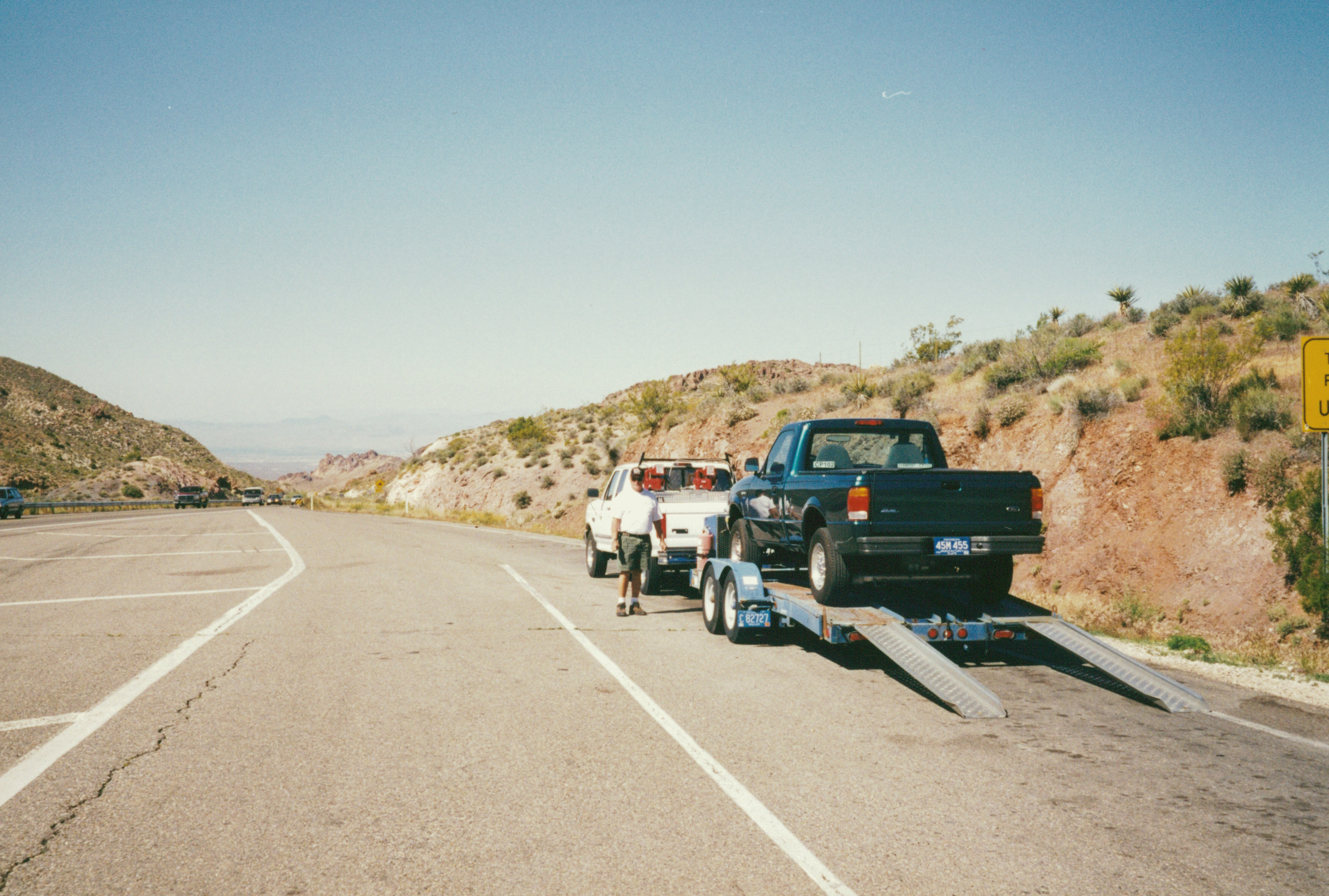
Hot Weather and Hill Descent testing, Davis Dam, Arizona USA.

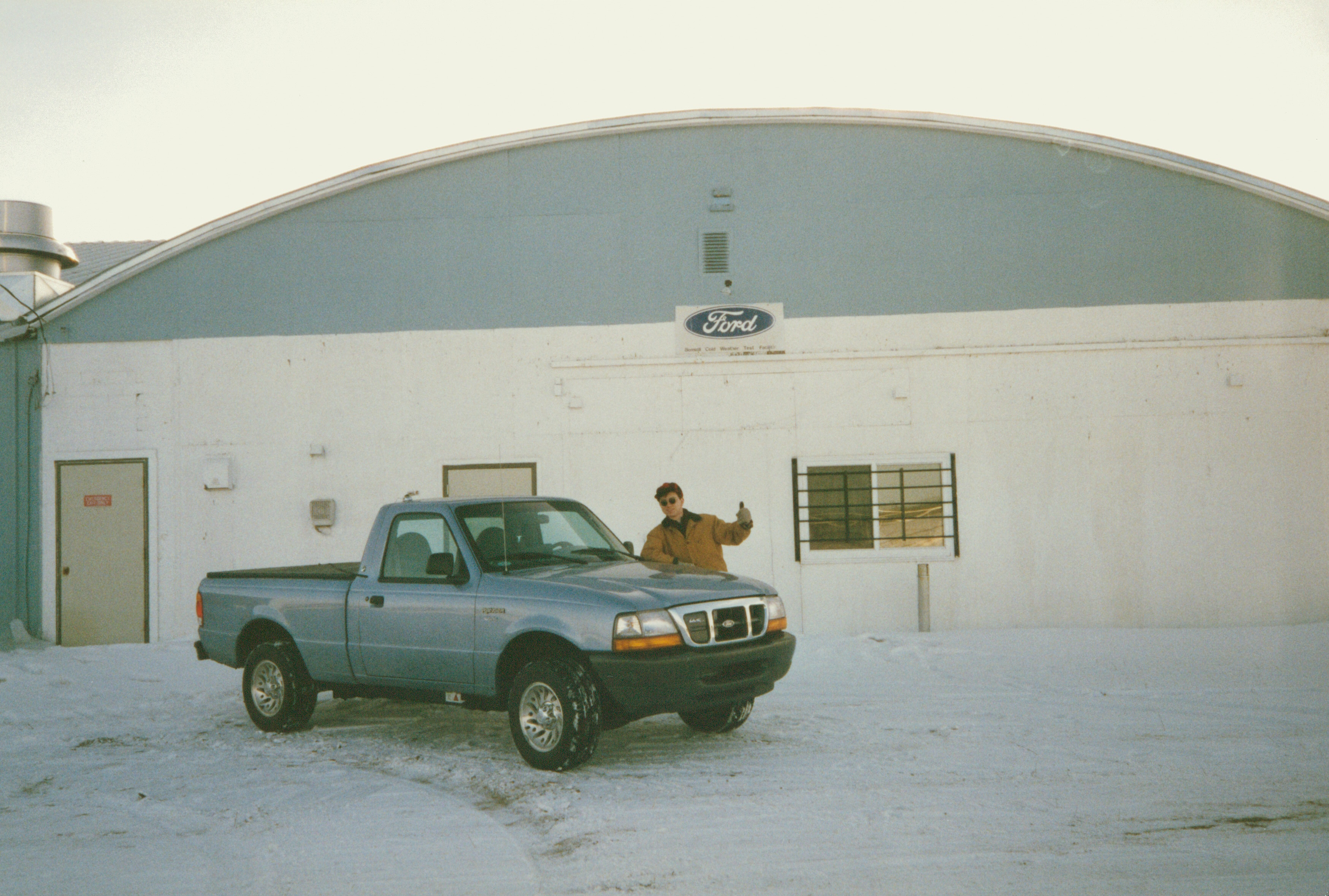
Cold Weather Testing at Ford Bemidji Testing Center - Bemidji, Minnesota USA

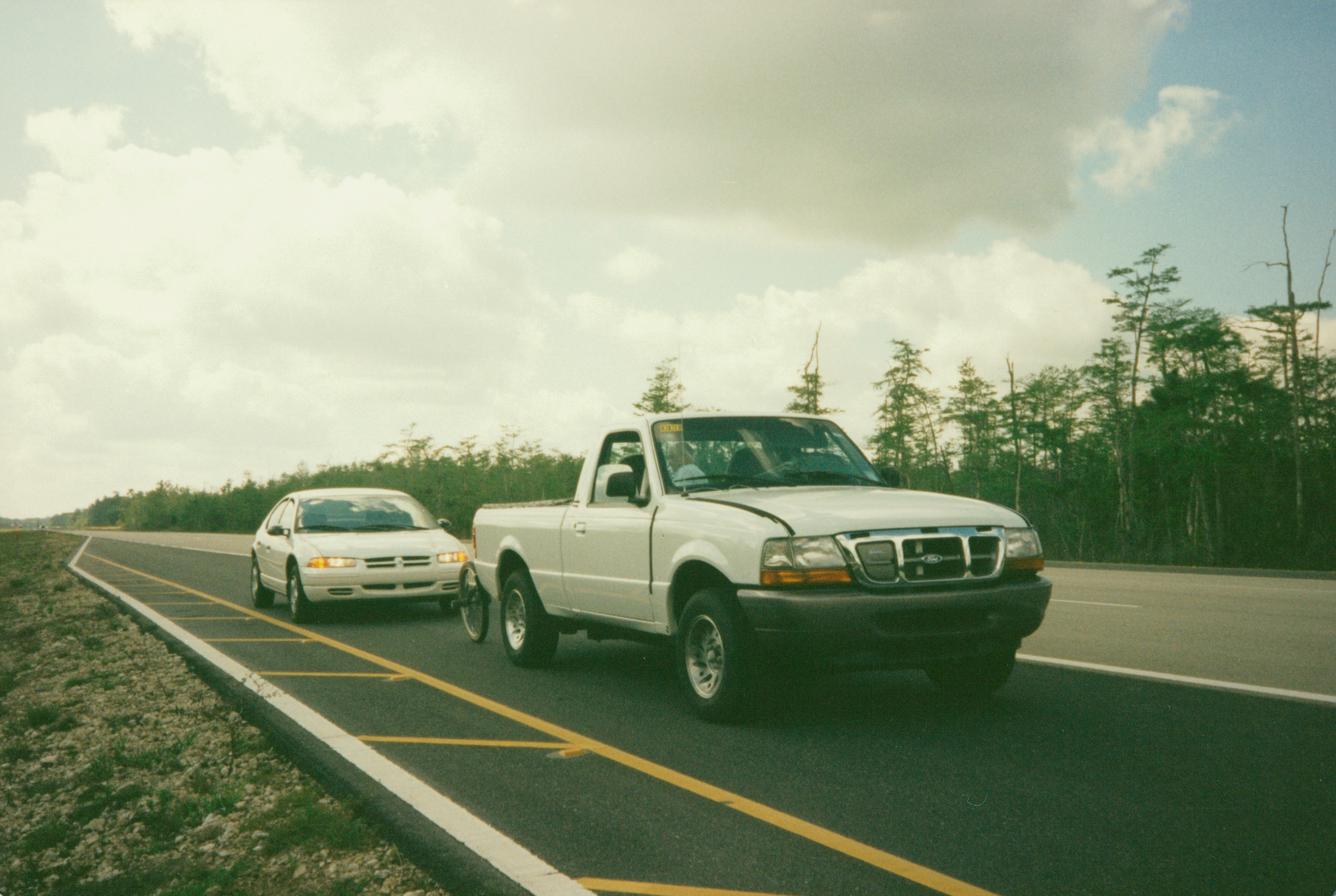
Driveability testing being conducted at the Ford Florida Evaluation Center, Naples, Florida USA.

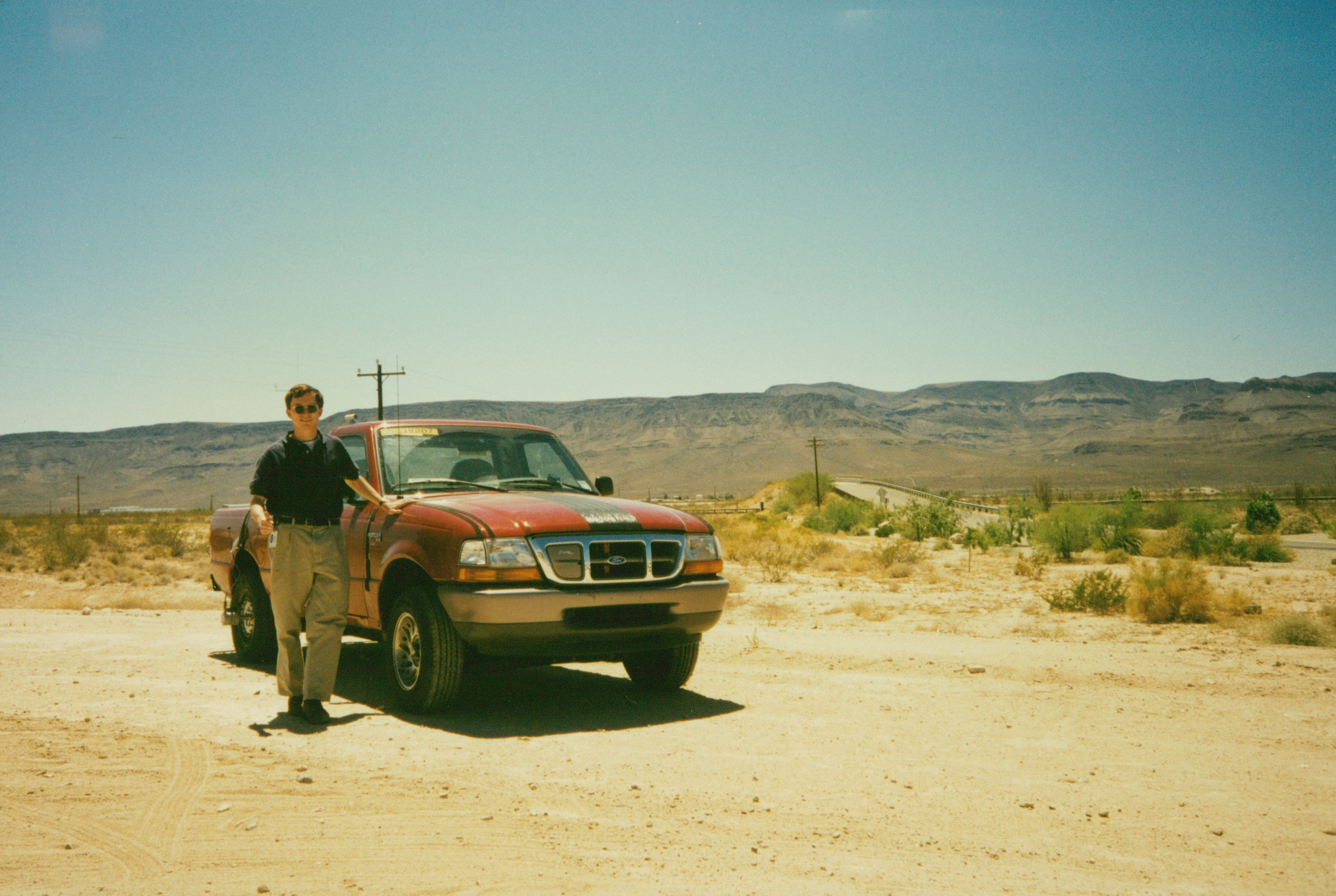
Hot Weather Testing at Ford AZ Proving Ground - Yucca, Arizona USA

== Manufacturing ==
Final Assembly of the Ranger EV took place at a craft center in Detroit, Michigan. Conventional Ranger trucks built without a powertrain (called "gliders") were built at the Ford Twin Cities plant in Minnesota and shipped to Detroit, where the EV powertrain, battery, and other EV-specific elements were installed.

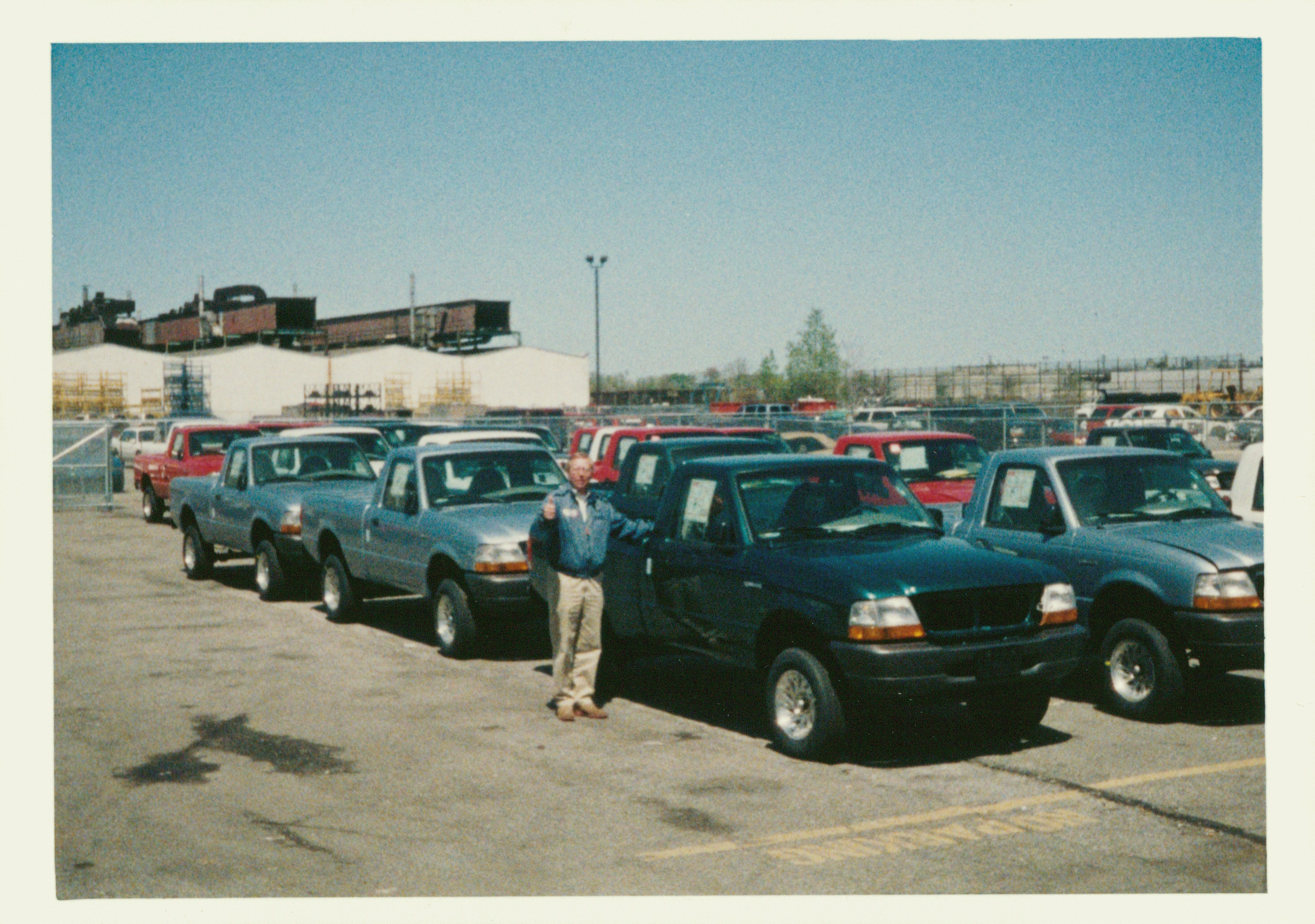
Ranger EV "gliders" prior to installation of the electric powertrain and battery, Detroit, Michigan.

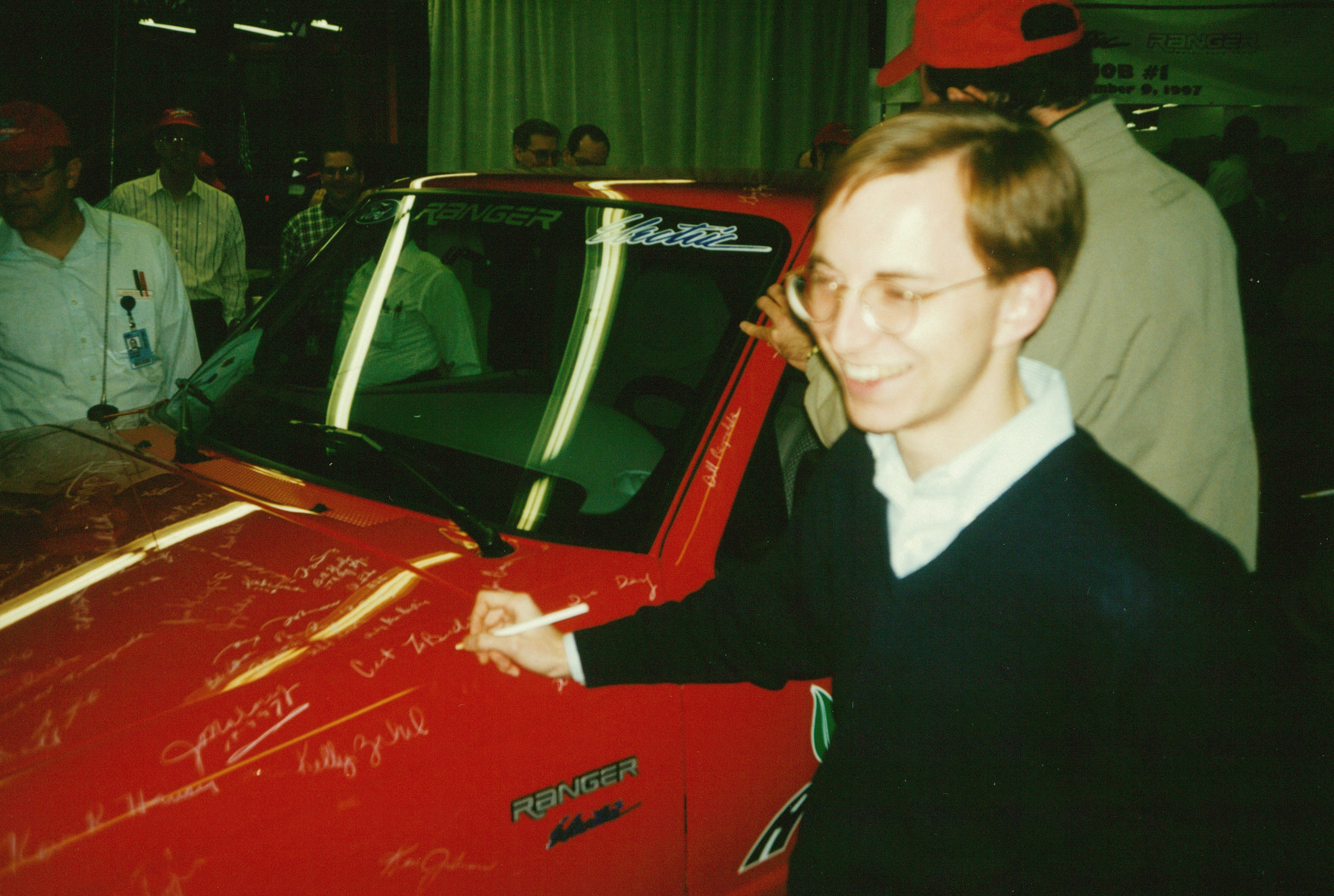
Ford Ranger EV "Job #1" - the first production unit - being signed by a member of Ford's EV Engineering Team during the launch event at the factory in Detroit, Michigan USA in 1998. This unit, Ford's first-ever production electric vehicle, had just been driven off the assembly line by Ford CEO Alex Trotman.

== Issues ==
=== Early life problems ===
There were numerous problems with the NiMH Ranger associated with an inability to accept a charge in hot environmental conditions, and some other problems requiring replacement of major components, but Ford successfully addressed these problems early in the vehicle's life cycle. There were some range issues around the 25,000-mile (40,200 km) service life with the batteries, and due to the great expense of these batteries, Ford elected not to fix this range problem (as allowed under the lease terms). Some leases were continued despite the shorter range.

=== Battery heating ===
The lead-acid batteries are sensitive to temperature, losing a substantial portion of capacity in winter conditions. When plugged in for charge the battery temperature is sensed and battery heaters used to maintain temperature sufficient to retain specified range – a necessity for colder climate fleet use, where vehicles are usually parked outdoors. This would suggest that to enhance the economy of use in such climates that the vehicle should be sheltered. NiMH batteries do not have this temperature sensitivity; however, models with NiMH batteries do have a loss in range in cold temperatures, perhaps because of greater rolling resistance in the drive train and tires.

=== Battery cooling ===
The ability to charge NiMH batteries is limited by heat gain, so these batteries are air-cooled by two fans. The first fan is circulating the air around the batteries. The second fan is exchanging the air inside the battery box.

=== Controversy and lottery ===
The majority of Ford Ranger EVs were leased to fleets. Some leased Ford Ranger EVs were sold to lessees, however, so there are some Ford Ranger EVs that have been and may be available for purchase as used.

It was expected that Ford, like other companies, would completely destroy almost all remaining stocks by crushing, as has been done by several other major vehicle manufacturers. This plan engendered considerable resistances from electric vehicle fans, with the adverse publicity prompting a change in Ford's policy. This change of policy appears to have also influenced Toyota not to destroy all of its leased RAV-4 electrics. Also, a persistent few of Ford's lease return resistors (some of whom were actually allowed to buy the vehicle under terms of their lease arrangements by the dealer's use of a non-specific lease form) were allowed to purchase their vehicles for one dollar. While most of the 1,500 vehicles produced have since been destroyed, a number of Ranger EVs have been parted out for spares and the remaining several hundred units have been refurbished (using selected used and new old stock batteries) and other salvage components (both with lead-acid and NiMH batteries) by a third-party company (Blue Sky Motors of Sacramento, California).

Some former NiMH Ranger operators have expressed surprise that any vehicles are being released with NiMH due to the extremely high cost of replacement of cells and packs, while others have pointed out that some NiMH vehicles have run for over 125,000 miles (201,000 km) on their original battery packs. It is not yet clear what would need to be changed within the vehicle to use other batteries such as PbA or NiCad.

== Discontinuation and later development ==
Ford has announced no plans to resume production of this model. The North American market Ford Ranger was discontinued after the 2011 model year, however, the Ranger line continued with the new T6 generation of the Ford Ranger for Europe. Ford, however, partnered with Azure Dynamics to provide an electric vehicle version of its popular Ford Transit Connect cargo van for the United States market only from 2010 to 2012. The Azure Transit Connect Electric has an EPA range of 56 miles (90 km), almost identical to that of the Ford Ranger EV.

Ford would later release an all-electric version of the Focus for the 2012 model year.

=== Availability in Nordic countries ===
Several Ford Ranger EV's were "rescued" in 2008 and transported to Norway, where a company named Elbil Import sells them to end users.

== See also ==
- RAV4 EV
- Chevrolet S-10 EV, a similar vehicle.
