= Solectria Sunrise =

Electric Passenger Car by Solectria

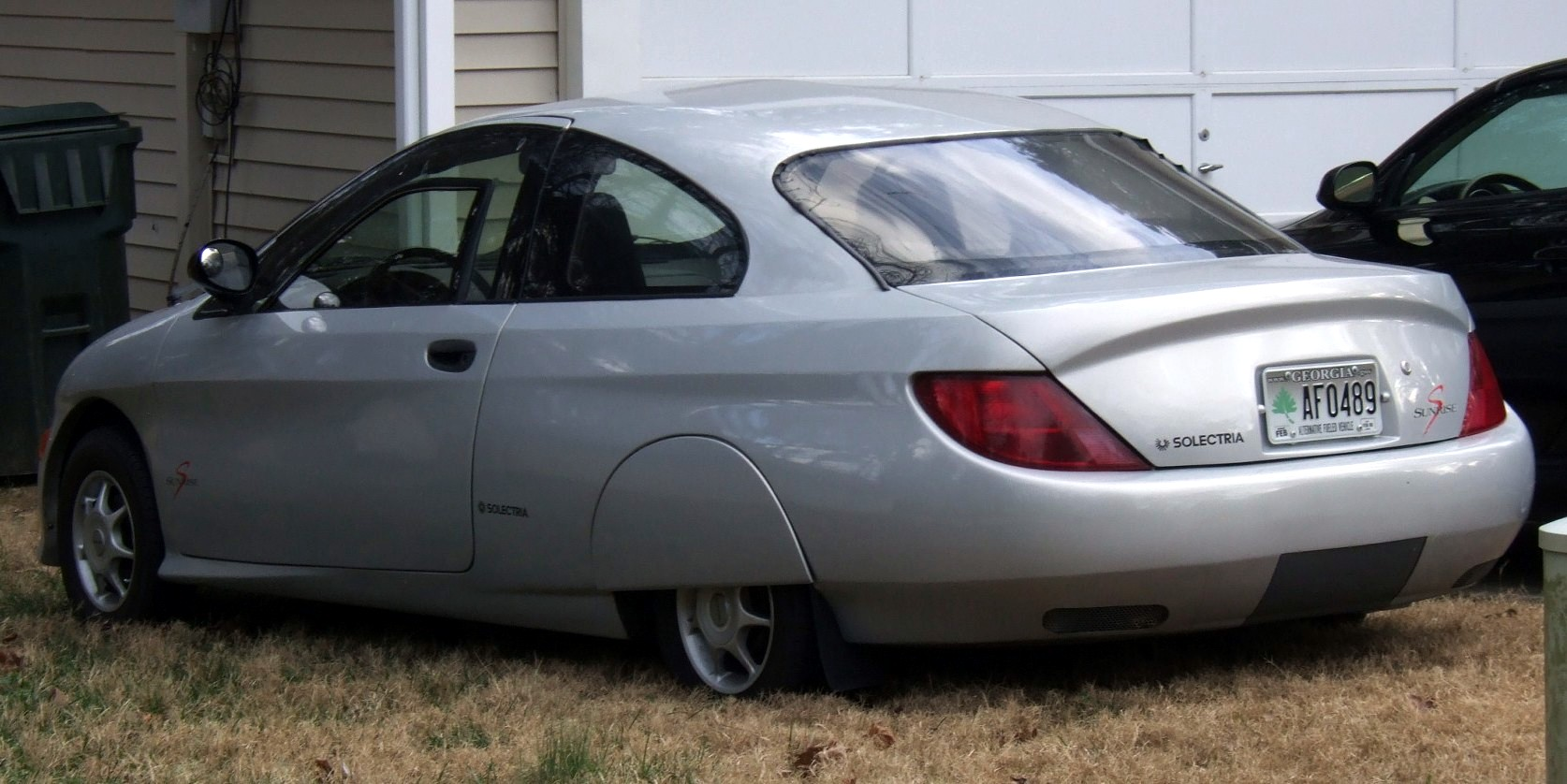
Solectria Sunrise

The Solectria Sunrise was an electric passenger car, designed to be as efficient as possible to produce long range from available battery technology.

Created by the Solectria Corporation of Woburn, Massachusetts (since acquired by Azure Dynamics Corporation), it was never produced beyond several prototypes, although significant effort was made to make the design worthy of mass-production—including crash testing.

The Sunrise is known for having achieved 375 miles (604 km) on a single charge, during the 1996 American Tour de Sol competition. A Sunrise was driven 217 miles (349 km) from Boston to New York city "on a single battery charge, negotiating everyday traffic and highway speeds up to 65 miles per hour" (104 km/h).

== Specifications ==
- Body
  - Composite, monocoque unibody shell
  - Coefficient of drag (Cd): approximately 0.17
- Dimensions
  - Length: 176" (447 cm)
  - Width: 74" (188 cm)
  - Height: 52" (132 cm)
  - Wheelbase: 104" (264 cm)
- Weights
  - Curb weight without batteries: 1433 lb (650 kg)
  - Payload: 682 lb (309 kg)
  - GVWR: 2979 lb (1351 kg)
- Drive system
  - 50 kW Solectria AC induction motor, inverter, driving front wheels via Geo Metro transaxle
- Batteries
  - 24 GM/Ovonic Nickel metal hydride battery, 12v 90 Ah
- Suspension
  - Front: 1994 Geo Metro MacPherson strut
  - Rear: 1994 Dodge Neon MacPherson strut
  - Coil springs with airbags
  - Manual rack and pinion steering
- Brakes
  - Manual, Geo Metro front disk, Dodge Neon drum rear
  - Regenerative braking
- Tires
  - 13" Geo Metro tires
- Performance
  - 0–30 mph: 6 seconds
  - 0–60 mph: 17 seconds
  - Range, nickel metal hydride battery: 400 miles (643 km) at 30 mph (48 km/h), 200 miles (321 km) at 60 mph (97 km/h).

== Kit version ==
In 2005, a single prototype as well as the moulds necessary to produce the composite chassis and body were sold and now belong to a hobbyist-led project to produce a similar vehicle as kits, to be known as the Sunrise EV2. See Sunrise-ev.com.

== See also ==
- Battery Electric Vehicles
- Solectria Force, a "conversion" vehicle from the same company.
- Aptera Motors, whose Typ-1 uses a drivetrain made by Azure Dynamics.
