= Solectria Corporation =

Defunct American EV company

- Industry: battery-electric vehicles
- Founded: 1989; 37 years ago in Wilmington, Massachusetts, United States
- Founders: James Worden, Anita Rajan
- Defunct: December 2004
- Fate: acquired
- Successor: Azure Dynamics
- Headquarters: Woburn, Massachusetts
- Products: Force, Sunrise
- Website: solectria.com

Solectria Corporation was responsible for the design, engineering, and manufacturing of energy management components for industrial applications, including electric vehicles, parallel hybrid drivetrains, and power generation applications. It was founded in 1989 and based in Woburn, Massachusetts. In December 2004, Solectria was acquired by Azure Dynamics.

== Corporate history ==
Solectria derives its name from the series of solar race cars built by James Worden starting in 1984; the Solectria I won the 1984 Massachusetts Science Fair, and he was admitted to Massachusetts Institute of Technology (MIT) that year. During his first year, he won the MIT Mechanical Engineering annual DeFlores Awards with his 'road worthy' solar car where he met several of his fellow MIT solar car team founding teammates who sparked the idea of racing. He graduated in 1989. That series of cars culminated in the Solectria V for the MIT Solar Electric Vehicle Team (SEVT) of 1988, which set a world speed record of 90 mph (140 km/h). Professors Woodie Flowers and Doc Edgerton played a key role in supporting the nascent SEVT, which raced for the first time in the 1987 Tour de Sol and World Solar Challenge with Solectria IV.

Worden founded Solectria Corporation in 1989 with a SEVT teammate and his future wife, Anita Rajan. They started by marketing components for teams seeking to enter solar car races. Although Worden designed the firm's first car, the LightSpeed, in early 1990, the company was becoming better-known as a supplier of key EV drivetrain components, including the DC-AC inverter to convert energy from the storage battery to the traction motor, and the motor controller. The first prototype LightSpeed was completed by May 1990, when it won the commuter class of the American Tour de Sol. It had gull-wing doors, a range of 120 mi (190 km), and weighed just 1,200 lb (540 kg) thanks to its aluminum chassis and composite body. Production of road-legal vehicles began in March 1991, with the electric vehicle conversion of a Geo Metro into the first Solectria Force. The first nine Forces were delivered to Arizona Public Service, Sacramento Municipal Utility District, and Southern California Edison. At the time, Solectria had just three full-time employees: Worden, Rajan, and Ed Trembly, an Arlington machinist who had helped Worden build the first Solectria cars in the 1980s.

A prototype Sunrise was completed in time to be displayed at the World Electric Vehicle Association's twelfth annual meeting (EVS-12) in Anaheim, held in December 1994; Solectria announced they would build 20,000 in 1997 and sell them for $20,000 each. Compared to the contemporary GM Impact, the Sunrise shown as EVS-12 was a rolling shell, without powertrain or battery. At the May 1995 American Tour de Sol, Worden raced the prototype Sunrise, winning the commuter category and setting a distance record of 238 mi (383 km) on a single charge along the way.

However, scaling Solectria's small operation for mass production of the Sunrise would prove to be difficult while demand dropped for its conversions due to legacy auto manufacturers entering the market for electric and hybrid vehicles. After completing approximately 400 Solectria-branded vehicles, the company announced in 2001 it was shifting its focus to component supply and engineering services instead.

Solectria was acquired by Azure Dynamics in December 2004; the stock swap resulted in Solectria shareholders owning approximately 20% of Azure. Solectria president John Mulcair became the President and COO of the combined company, while Azure CEO David Deacon became Executive VP of Marketing and Business Development. Solectria CEO Worden stepped down but retained a position on the advisory board.

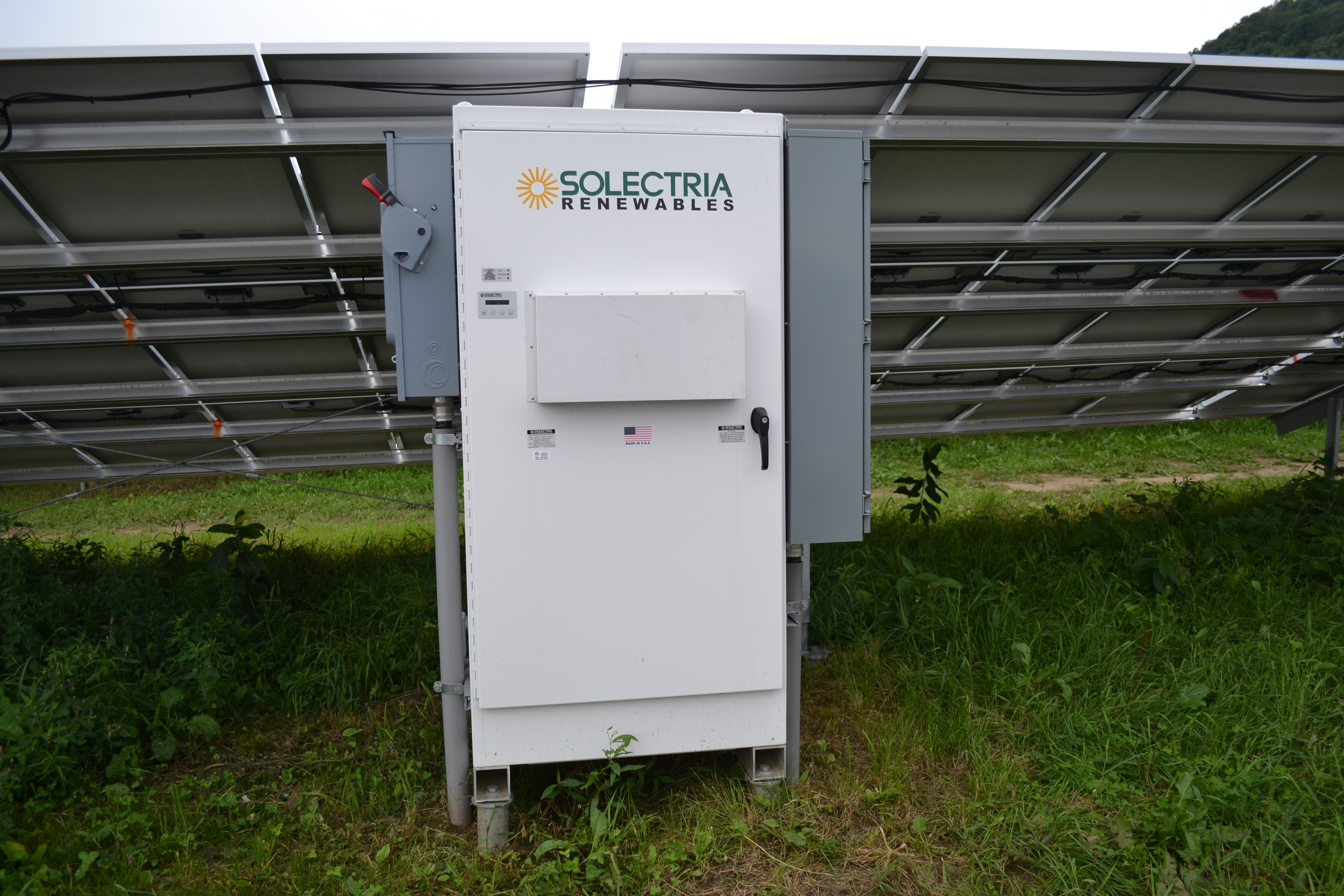
Solectria Renewables device in a photovoltaic power plant

Anita and James Worden founded Solectria Renewables in 2005 as a spinoff of Solectria Corporation, focusing on the solar inverter market. Solectria Renewables was acquired by Yaskawa America in 2014.

== Products ==
=== Electric vehicle components ===
Solectria offered a line of electric vehicle drivetrain components, including traction motors with different technologies (AC induction, DC brushless and brushed permanent magnet), the accompanying motor controllers, reduction gearboxes, battery chargers, and DC-to-DC converters (to operate existing 12V parts and accessories using the high-voltage storage battery).

=== Electric vehicles ===
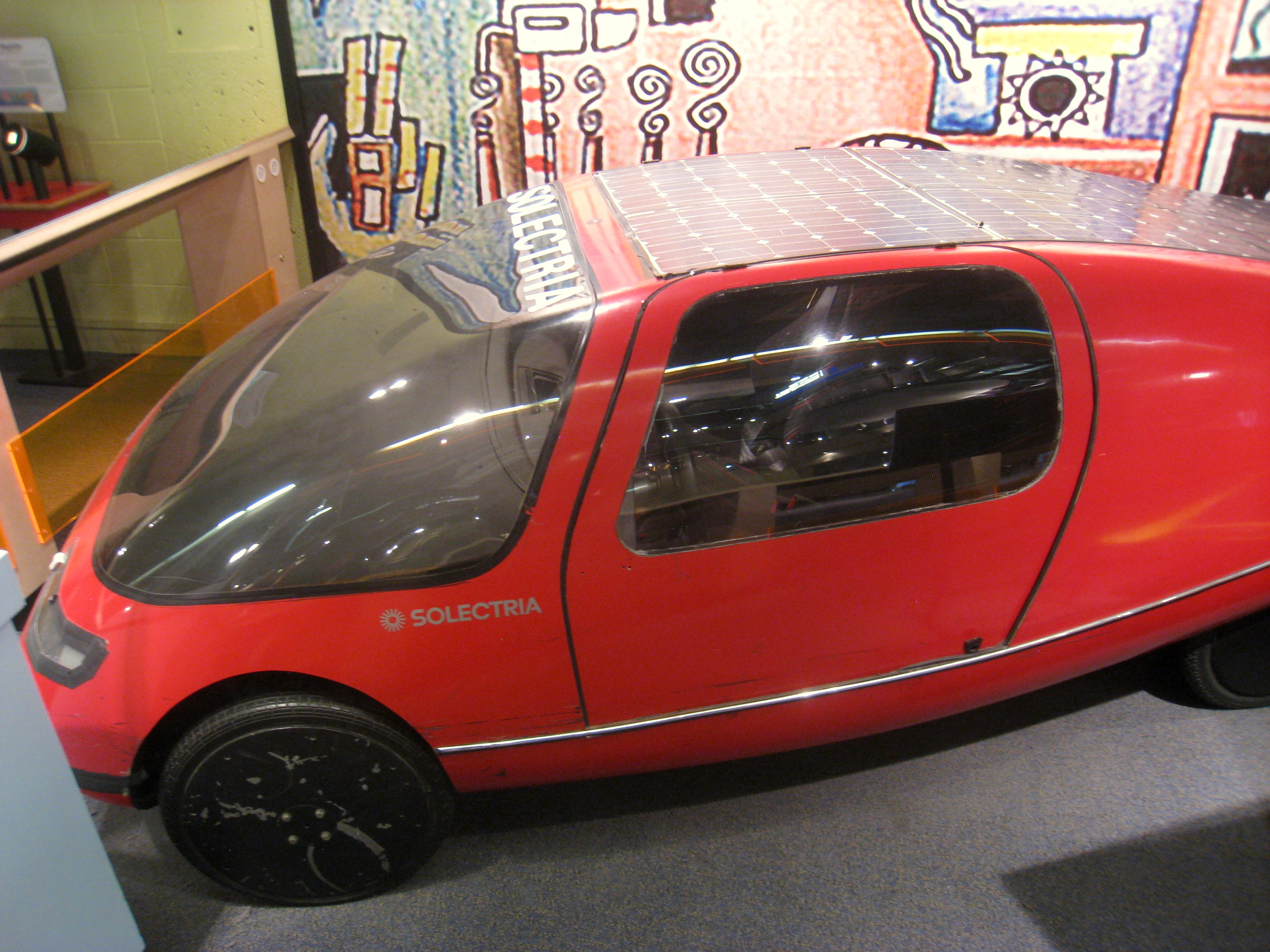
Solectria LightSpeed at the Boston Museum of Science

- CitiVan (converted Chevrolet P30)
- DW (converted Daewoo Cielo/Pontiac LeMans)
- E-10 (converted Chevrolet S-10)
- Flash
- Force (converted Geo Metro)
- LightSpeed
- Sunrise

==== Racing prototypes ====
The LightSpeed (1990) and Flash (1991) were prototypes that followed the lightweight, efficiency-focused principles of the SEVT cars designed by Worden, and were campaigned in the American Tour de Sol. The LightSpeed was equipped with solar panels generating 200 W (0.27 hp) and driven by two 30 hp (22 kW) electric traction motors; it carried nickel-cadmium batteries and weighed 850 lb (390 kg). The Flash had three wheels, driven by a 20 hp (15 kW) brushless permanent magnet DC motor, weighing 860 lb (390 kg), of which 400 lb (180 kg) was the NiCd batteries.

==== Passenger vehicles ====
The company's first road-legal vehicles were the Force, which had a suggested retail price of US$26,000 (equivalent to $51,000 in 2025) in 1998, and the E-10, MSRP US$43,000 (equivalent to $85,000 in 2025). The cost was high relative to the donor vehicles because Solectria could not obtain gliders, which are vehicle chassis without powertrain components such as the engine and transmission, until December 1998. The Solectria Force was introduced in 1991, followed by the E-10 in 1993; the Sunrise was planned to follow for the 1998 model year. By 1995, more than 160 Solectria electric vehicles had been sold, collectively accumulating more than 1,000,000 mi (1,600,000 km). Clients included Arizona Public Service, Boston Edison Company, Southern California Edison, State of Massachusetts (Division of Energy Resources), Connecticut Commuter EV Demo Program, Virginia Power, and EVermont.

All three production vehicle lines used AC induction traction motors and came standard with lead-acid batteries. A variant of the Force with nickel-metal hydride batteries was introduced in August 1995, giving the vehicle a range exceeding 100 mi (160 km) and a minimum battery life of six years. Solectria marketed its vehicles in Japan through Sanoh Industrial.

Initial design work for the Sunrise was handled by Richard Gresens, refined by James Kuo, a recent graduate of the ArtCenter College of Design in Pasadena. Worden had envisioned a subcompact car, while Boston Edison, who were co-sponsoring the project with DARPA, were looking for a full-size sedan; the mid-size Sunrise was the compromise. Just three Sunrise prototypes were completed.

==== Commercial vehicles ====
The CitiVan delivery van was unveiled in December 1997. It had a top speed of 45 mph (72 km/h) and a range, fully loaded with 3,500 lb (1,600 kg), of 40 mi (64 km). Solectria followed with the off-highway Flash "micro pickup truck", introduced in July 1998.

In November 1998, Transport Canada commissioned Solectria to convert two Grumman LLVs to battery-electric; they were delivered to Canada Post in February 1999. The performance report, comparing the converted LLV to a conventional LLV, was published in February 2000.

=== Hybrid drivetrain components ===
Solectria began supplying components to Advanced Vehicle Systems (AVS) of Chattanooga, Tennessee in 1998, which integrated them into electric and hybrid electric buses. AVS supplied hybrid buses to the Chattanooga Area Regional Transportation Authority. In addition, Solectria supplied electric drivetrain components to New Flyer (for an Orange County Transportation Authority bus) and Resurfice Corporation (for the Olympia Cellect).

== See also ==
- Jet Industries, electric car conversion company in the 70's and 80's
- U.S. Electricar, electric car conversion company in the 70's through the 90's
