= Ulrich Eichhorn =

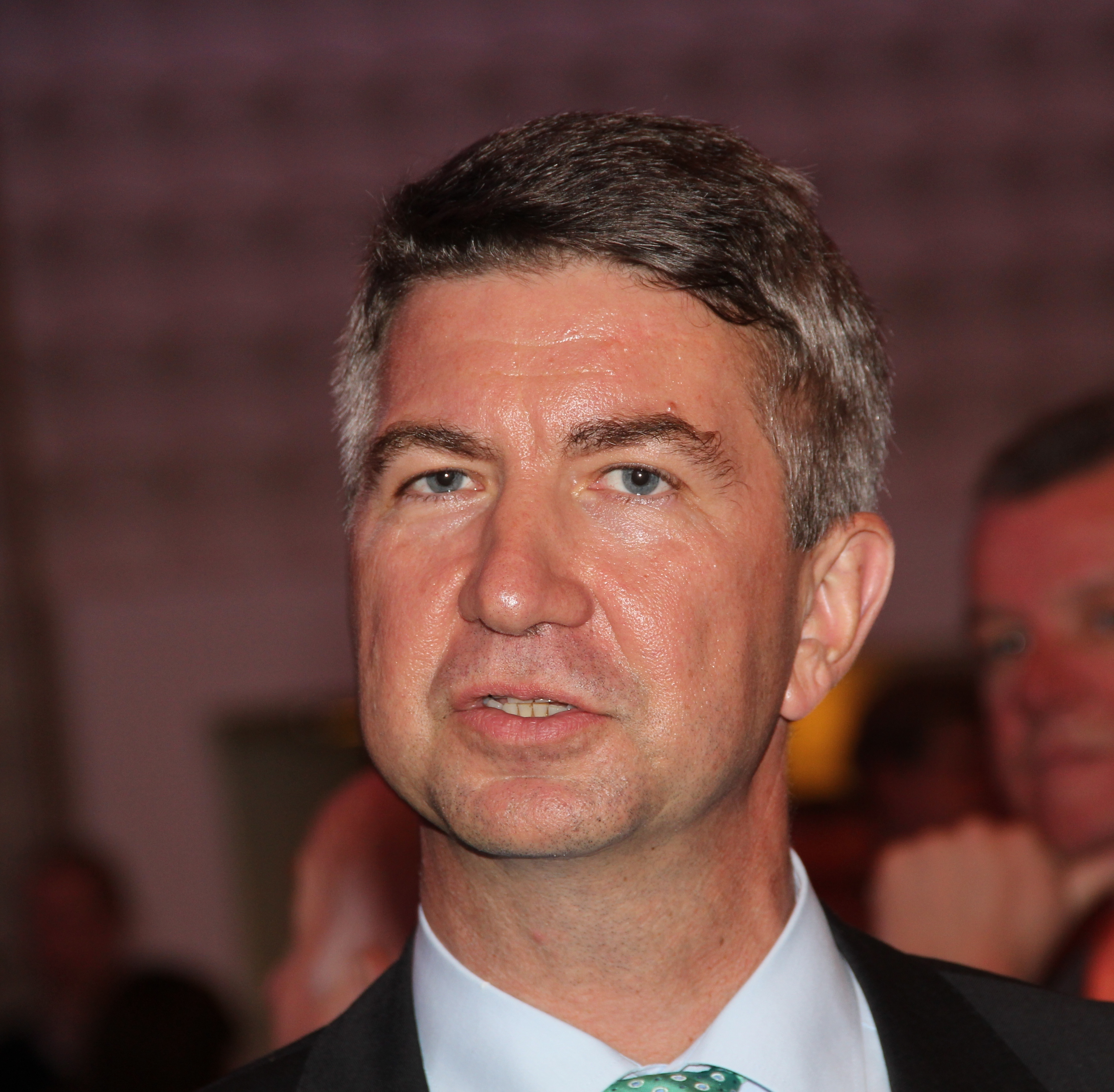
- Eichhorn in 2013.
- Born: 1961 (age 64–65); Obernburg, Germany
- Education: Technische Universität Darmstadt, Harvard University
- Occupation: Car designer
- Known for: Ford Focus, Volkswagen XL1, Bentley Continental GT

Ulrich Eichhorn (born 1961) is a German engineer, manager and car designer.

== Early life and education ==
Eichhorn was born in Obernburg, Germany. He studied mechanical and automotive engineering at Technische Universität Darmstadt. In 1992, he graduated with a doctorate in mechanical engineering from Darmstadt. He is also an alumnus of Harvard Business School, where he was class speaker of AMP174.

== Career ==
Eichhorn worked at Ford Motor Company, becoming head of vehicle dynamics and leading several individual projects. He was involved in designing the first generation Ford Focus, where he worked on the chassis. He joined Volkswagen Group as director of research in 2000. He was involved in projects such as SunFuel, an alternative fuel, the Volkswagen W12, and the Volkswagen XL1. In 2003, he became a board member at Bentley, which is owned by Volkswagen Group, with responsibility for technical development. He was in charge of engineering at Bentley during the release of the Bentley Continental GT, the Continental GT Convertible and the Bentley Flying Spur.

His motorsport credentials include three consecutive wins of the Tour de Sol, the 24h World Speed Record with the Volkswagen Nardo in 2002 and Bentley's Le Mans victory in 2003.

In 2012, Eichhorn was appointed as managing director of Verband der Automobilindustrie (VDA), and in 2016 he was appointed as head of group research and development at Volkswagen. From January 2019 to December 2020, Eichhorn was chairman of the management board of engineering service provider IAV before returning to Volkswagen.
