= American Tour de Sol =

Annual electric vehicle conference and rally (1989–2006)

The American Tour de Sol (ATdS) was an annual electric vehicle conference and rally that ran from 1989 to 2006 under the supervision of the Northeast Sustainable Energy Association (NESEA), drawing inspiration from the Tour de Sol that started in Switzerland in 1985. One of the annual ATDS events was a multi-day road rally from Montpelier, Vermont to Boston which started in 1990. After gaining support from the United States Department of Energy, the ATdS began including alternative fuel vehicles.

== History ==
American Tour de Sol
Dates	Start	Finish	Production class winner				Ref.
Dates	Start	Finish	Mfr.	No.	Vehicle	Score	Ref.
May 23, 1994 – May 28, 1994	New York City	Philadelphia, PA	Ford	23	Ecostar	612.2 mi (985.2 km) (distance traveled)	
May 19, 1995 – May 26, 1995	Waterbury, CT	Portland, ME	Solectria / Virginia Power	56	Force GT	538.7 mi (867.0 km) (distance traveled)	
May 12, 1996 – May 16, 1996	New York City	Washington, DC	Solectria	4	Force NiMH	604.7 mi (973.2 km) (distance traveled)	
May 17, 1997 – May 24, 1997	Waterbury, CT	Portland, ME	Solectria	76	Force NiMH	584.0 mi (939.9 km) (distance traveled)	
May 8, 1998 – May 14, 1998	New York City	Washington, DC	Solectria / Ovonic	76	Force NiMH	112.90 (points)	
May 22, 1999 – May 29, 1999	Waterbury, CT	Lake George, NY	Solectria / EVermont	15	Force NiMH	89.55 (points)	
