= Azure Dynamics =

Azure Dynamics Corporation
- Type: Public
- Traded as: OTCID Basic: AZDDQ
- Industry: Hybrid electric vehicle, electric vehicle, electric truck
- Predecessor: Solectria Corporation
- Defunct: December 2012
- Headquarters: Oak Park, Michigan, United States
- Area served: Worldwide
- Key people: Scott T. Harrison, D. Campbell Deacon
- Products: Balance Hybrid; Transit Connect Electric; LEEP, Freeze, Lift; Force Drive Electric
- Total assets: ▲ C$ 58.4 million (2009)

Azure Dynamics Corporation was incorporated under the laws of Alberta, Canada, having been spun out of BC Research Inc. Azure was headquartered in Oak Park, Michigan, a suburb of Detroit. The company's principal business was in the development and integration of its proprietary electric and hybrid electric drive technology, primarily for the light and heavy duty commercial vehicle categories. Azure filed for bankruptcy protection in 2012.

== Corporate history ==
Solectria Corporation was one of the pioneering American companies developing commercial electric vehicles since its founding in 1989, based in Woburn, Massachusetts. On December 17, 2004, it was announced that Solectria and Azure Dynamics were merging. Azure Dynamics Corporation acquired all assets of Solectria in 2005. Solectria is credited for the original development of the ForceDrive Electric drive train, the Solectria Force, the Solectria E10, and the Solectria Sunrise. The Solectria Sunrise set an all-electric vehicle record by traveling 375 miles on a single charge during the 1996 NESEA American Tour de Sol.

Due to financial difficulties, Azure filed for bankruptcy protection in the Supreme Court of British Columbia in March 2012, and production of the Transit Connect Electric van and Balance hybrid was stopped. As of December 2012, operating status of this company is now closed.

== Products ==
=== Transit Connect Electric ===
The Transit Connect Electric is an all-electric van developed as a collaboration between Azure Dynamics and Ford Motor Company, but Azure is the official manufacturer of record. Production began in December 2010, and will reach full capacity in April 2011 to produce between 600 and 700 units a year.

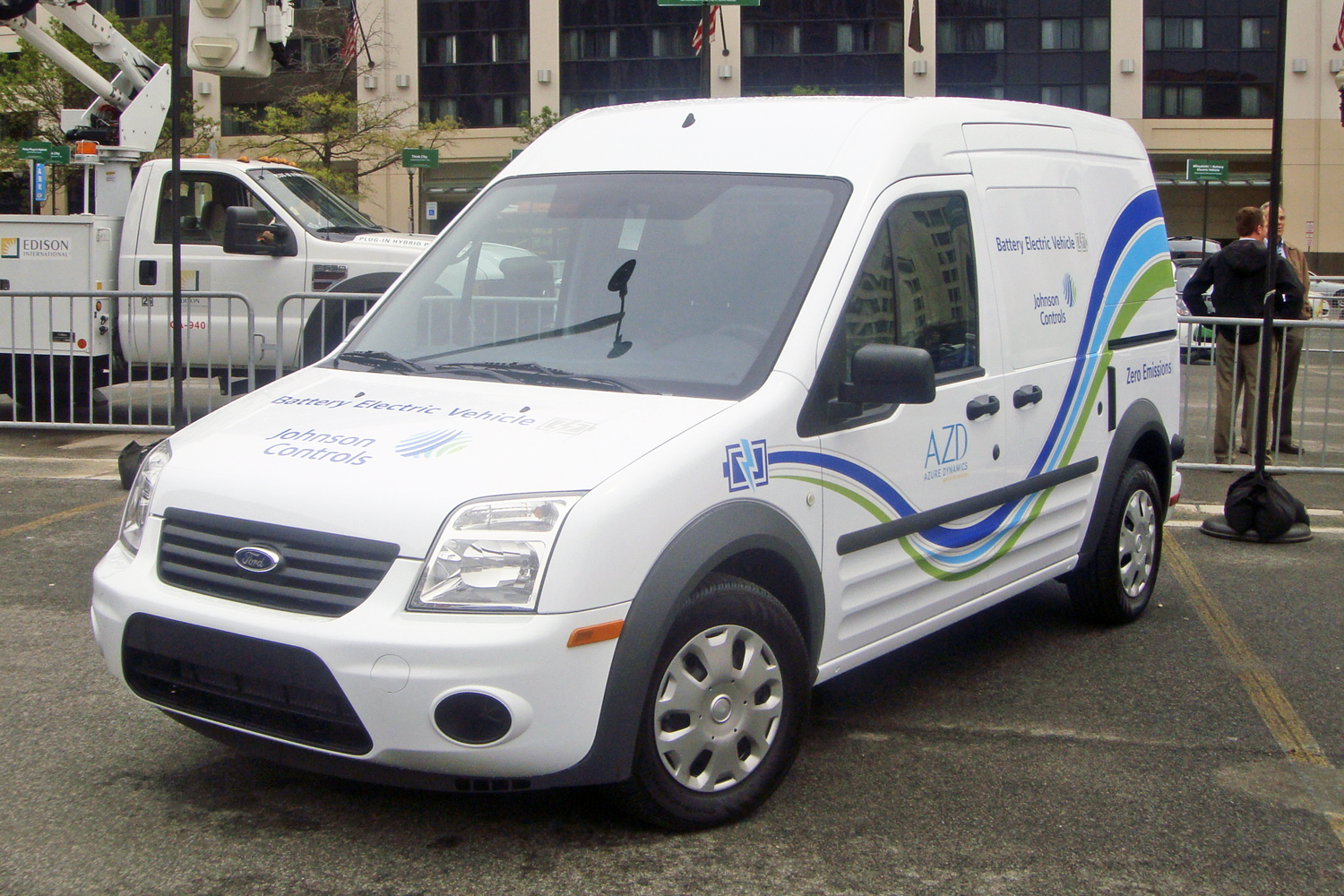
The Azure Dynamics/Ford Transit Connect Electric has a range of 56 mi (90 km).

The Transit Connect Electric is produced using a vehicle glider at a Ford Motor Company facility in Kocaeli, Turkey and then shipped to Azure Dynamics U.S. upfitter, AM General in Livonia, Michigan, where the Force Drive electric drive train and other components are added to the vehicle. Azure Dynamics has partnered with Johnson Controls-Saft to produce the lithium-ion battery pack used in the Transit Connect Electric. The vehicle is badged with both the Ford Blue Oval and Azure's Force Drive logos, with Azure Dynamics being the manufacturer of record.

According to Ford and Azure, the Transit Connect Electric has an all-electric range of up to 80 mi (130 km), but the official US Environmental Protection Agency range is 56 mi (90 km). The electric van has a speed up to 75 mph (121 km/h).

The rated the combined city/highway fuel economy at 62 miles per gallon gasoline equivalent (3.8 L/100 km) based on the five-cycle tests using varying driving conditions and climate controls, with the same 62 mpg-e rating for both city and highway. The energy consumption for combined city/highway was rated at 54 kW·h/100 mi.

=== Balance Hybrid Electric ===
The Azure Dynamics Balance Hybrid Electric vehicle is built on the Ford E-450 commercial stripped or cutaway chassis. The vehicle is modified with the Azure Force Drive Electric drivetrain technology, along with the Johnson Controls-Saft lithium-ion battery, by Utilimaster and then sent to one of Azure's bus body manufactures such as Collins Bus, Champion Bus, ElDorado National, Goshen Coach, StarTrans and TurtleTop where it is built as a shuttle bus, Class A school bus, delivery truck, etc. Azure Dynamics owns approximately 60% market share of the medium duty commercial hybrid truck market

=== Force Drive Electric ===
The Force Drive Electric is a proprietary electric drive train component developed by Azure Dynamics. This drive system is based upon the product originally developed by Solectria Corporation, which was acquired by Azure Dynamics in 2005. The Force Drive drive train is integrated into the Ford Transit Connect Electric, Ford E-Series Balance Hybrid, as well has a number of other passenger and medium and heavy duty trucks. The Force Drive was used in the Wave II electric vehicle developed by Li-Ion Motors, the $2.5 million prize winner in the "Alternative Side by Side Class" category of the 2010 Progressive X-Prize competition.
