= Enova Systems =

- Formerly: Clover Solar (1976–79); Solar Electric Engineering (1979–94); U.S. Electricar (1994–2000)
- Industry: battery electric vehicle conversions and powertrains
- Predecessor: U.S. Electricar (1978–93)
- Founded: July 30, 1976; 50 years ago
- Defunct: August 31, 2014
- Headquarters: Torrance, California
- Website: enovasystems.com

Enova Systems was a United States corporation which designed and supplied battery electric vehicle powertrains and components. The company was founded initially as Clover Solar Corporation on July 30, 1976, in Santa Rosa, California, and changed its name to Solar Electric Engineering in June 1979.

U.S. Electricar was a company founded contemporaneously in the late 1970s by Chandler H. Waterman in Athol, Massachusetts, best known for electric vehicle conversions of regular production automobiles in the 1970s, including the DAF 46 and Lectric Leopard (Renault LeCar and Fiat Strada). After Electricar was acquired by Solar Electric Engineering, the company adopted the U.S. Electricar name in January 1994 and launched a short-lived new line of conversions, including the Grumman LLV, Geo Prizm, and Chevrolet S-10. The company's final name change was to Enova Systems in July 2000.

== Corporate history ==
Enova trace their origins to Clover Solar, founded July 30, 1976. The company and its successor, Solar Electric Engineering, based in Rohnert Park, California, initially specialized in products harnessing solar energy, including garden lights, photovoltaic panels, and hot water heaters.

=== Conversions ===
Chandler H. Waterman built his first electric vehicle conversion in 1968, based on the Datsun 1200, as a hobbyist in Athol, working part-time after his job at Simplex Time Recorder; he was a self-admitted "assembler using off-the-shelf components". Waterman's eponymous company, C.H. Waterman Industries, moved on to market DAF 46 and Renault 5 (Le Car) conversions with 96 volt lead-acid traction batteries; the latter was sold as the "Electricar 1". In 1978, the Renault conversion was rebranded as the Lectric Leopard and the U.S. Electricar Corporation was formed as a division of Waterman Industries. The Lectric Leopard attracted attention at its launch thanks to its distributor, John Hoy Kauffmann, who was marketing the converted vehicle to government agencies. Previously, Kauffmann was a member of the ownership group that formerly held The Washington Star. In 1979, U.S. Electricar was the largest producer of battery-electric automobiles in the United States, with 79 completed. The Lectric Leopard had a suggested retail price in 1981 of US$11,000 (equivalent to $39,000 in 2025), more than double the cost of the donor Renault due in part to the extra labor cost of having to remove the conventional drivetrain; U.S. Electricar signed an agreement with Fiat in 1980, who would supply Strada gliders without drivetrains, reducing costs.

Solar Electric began electric car conversions in approximately 1989 and had completed 40 electric car conversions by 1991, marketing the Electron at US$15,700 (equivalent to $37,100 in 2025) and Destiny at US$28,000 (equivalent to $66,200 in 2025); the firm sold its first cars to celebrities including Alan Alda, Kirstie Alley, Ted Danson, Woody Harrelson, and Dennis Weaver. Noel Perrin was another one of the first customers, purchasing an Electron (converted Ford Escort) and driving it cross-country from California to Vermont.

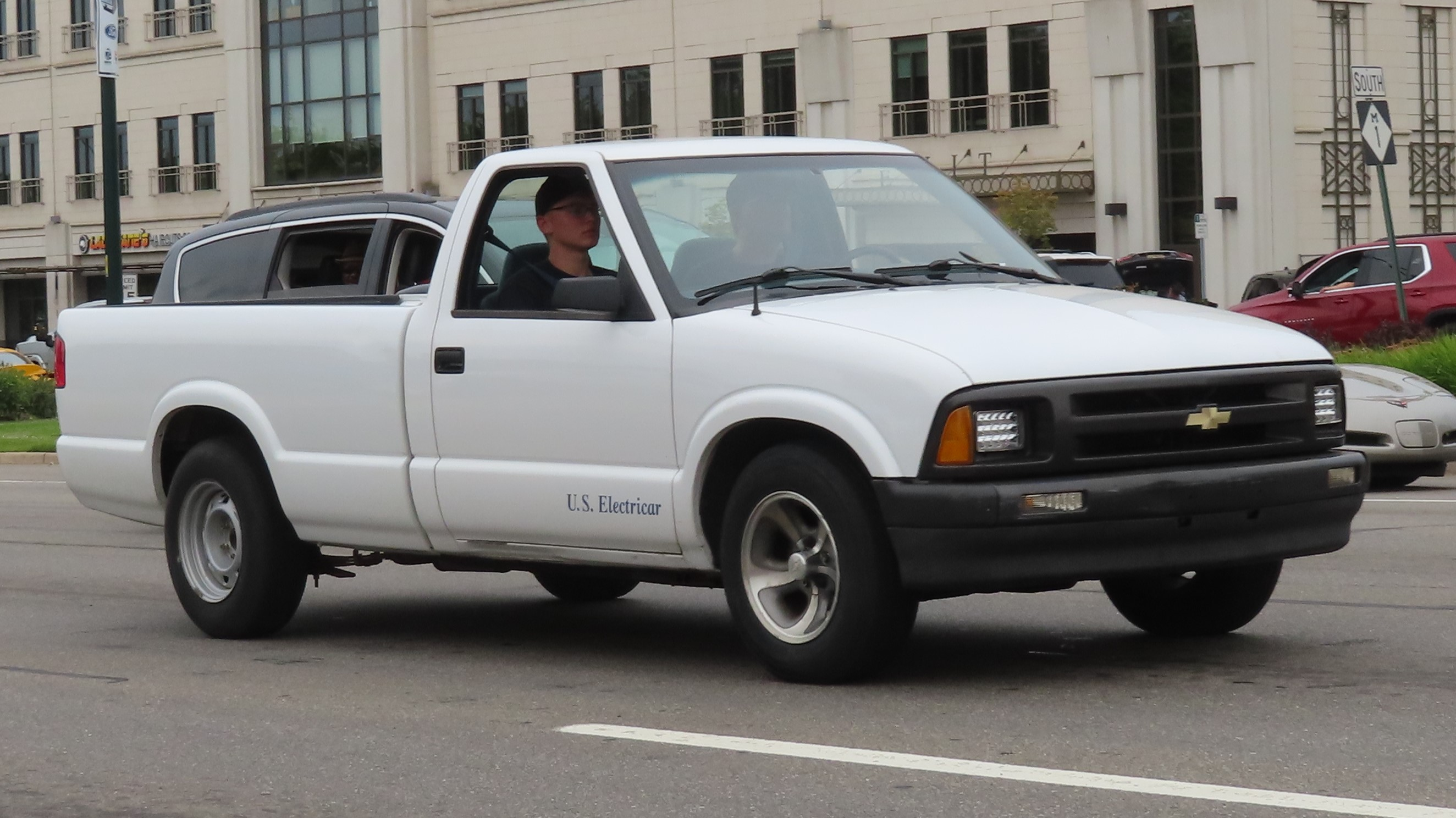
Converted Chevrolet S-10

By 1992, the company had converted 140 vehicles, mostly Ford Escorts and Chevrolet S-10 pickups. That year, William Meurer opened Green Motor Works Inc. in North Hollywood, a dealership which planned to sell exclusively electric cars converted by Solar Electric or using parts sourced from them. Meurer first sold a Destiny to actor Leslie Nielsen; by 1993, Green Motor Works was concentrating on selling the Kewet neighborhood electric vehicle. Solar Electric Engineering had moved to a larger headquarters in Sebastopol, California.

After Solar Electric acquired U.S. Electricar in the early 1990s, the company launched new conversions and took on a pilot program to convert United States Postal Service Grumman LLV delivery trucks. At the time, the electric vehicle market consisted mostly of conversions using lead-acid batteries. U.S. Electricar signed an agreement in 1993 with Hughes Power Control Systems to purchase 1,100 AC traction motors and motor controllers, which would be used to convert Chevrolet S-10 pickup and Geo Prizm sedans in a South Central Los Angeles facility. The AC traction motors were derived from the one used in the GM Impact, and were more efficient than the DC motors that Electricar had used previously. That August, Solar Electric acquired the electric vehicle manufacturing arm of Nordskog Industries in Redlands.

In an attempt to produce the fastest production electric vehicle in the world, they also converted Mosler Consulier GTP's in 1993 to go 100 mph and make EV's appear cool and not just for economy cars. Leslie Nielsen promoted the car and was in advertisements for it, and it was planned that they were to be sold through Neiman Marcus. One is displayed in the Petersen Museum in California.

The southern California assembly plant opened near Carson in May 1994. That June, U.S. Electricar signed an agreement with Itochu Corporation to market converted S-10 pickup and LLV delivery vans in Japan, with Itochu taking a 4.5% ownership stake for US$15 million. In late summer 1994, U.S. Electricar delivered 25 S-10 pickup conversions to Virginia Power and entered a joint venture with Niagara Mohawk Power Corporation to build an assembly facility in Syracuse, New York. Most of its sales were to public electric utility fleets.

=== Licensing and partnerships ===
The new Republican majority in Congress elected in 1994 had a chilling effect on potential investors. In March 1995, the company, now based in Santa Rosa, abruptly laid off a third of its workforce and moved away from selling electric conversions, closing its conversion facilities in Florida and southern California. An interim loan from Itochu kept the company solvent, but CEO Ted Morgan stepped down and was succeeded by Roy Kusumoto in April. During the following spring (1996), the California Air Resources Board rolled back its electric vehicle mandate, which would have required that two percent of cars sold in California have no tailpipe emissions, further depressing demand.

In 1997, U.S. Electricar announced an agreement with Hyundai Motor Company; Hyundai would invest $3.6 million and purchased a $2 million license for its Panther 60 kW electric motor drivetrain technology. By November, the company had relocated to Torrance and CEO Kusumoto announced his resignation, succeeded by Carl D. Perry. U.S. Electricar partnered with Hyundai to develop the parallel hybrid vehicle drivetrain used in the FGV-II concept car which debuted at the 1999 Seoul Motor Show. That year, the company announced it would change its name to Enova Systems. Enova developed production hybrid and fuel cell powertrains for Hyundai. Enova also announced partnerships with Ecostar Electric Drive Systems for the Think City, Capstone Turbine, and Gillig in 2000.

Hyundai and Enova entered a joint venture in March 2003 and dissolved it six years later.

Separately, Enova developed a hybrid school bus with IC Corporation, first unveiled in July 2006. In May 2008, Enova entered a long-term supply agreement with IC Bus for the parallel hybrid drivetrain.

Enova Systems was declared essentially defunct in August 2014, with few assets, significant losses, and only a single employee, CEO John Micek. The last filing by Enova Systems with the Securities and Exchange Commission was for the quarter ending September 30, 2015, reporting a loss of US$188,000 over the prior three months.

== Products ==
- Lectric Leopard
  - 953 (Renault LeCar conversion, 1974–80)
  - 960 (Bradley GT conversion, 1980?)
  - 964A (Fiat Strada conversion, 1981+)
- Electron (Ford Escort conversion, 1989–94)
- Destiny 2000 (Pontiac Fiero conversion, 1989–94)
- Pickup (Chevrolet S-10 conversion, 1994)
- Sedan (Geo Prizm conversion, 1994)
- Grumman LLV conversion (1995)

Waterman's Lectric Leopard conversions used a simple pedal-operated motor controller that varied the voltage to the DC traction motor through a finite series of detents.

A Destiny 2000 was featured in the film The Naked Gun 2 1/2.

The "Panther 60" drivetrain included an AC induction traction motor with 60 kW (80 hp) output, a DC/DC converter (1.2 kW), heat pump, and on-board 6.6 kW charger. It was used in the Grumman LLV conversion. The traction motor was packaged as a unit with the reduction gearbox and parking pawl. Various outputs were available, including 90 and 120 kW (120 and 160 hp) units.

Panther Electric Drive Units
| Name | Type | Power | | Torque | Weight |
| Name | Type | Max | Cont. | Torque | Weight |
|---|---|---|---|---|---|
| EDM60 | AC induction | 60 kW; 80 hp at 3600 RPM | 22.5 kW; 30.2 hp | 159 N⋅m; 117 lbf⋅ft | 56 kg 123 lb |
| EDM90 | AC induction | 90 kW; 120 hp at 3600 RPM | 30 kW; 40 hp | 239 N⋅m; 176 lbf⋅ft | 65 kg 143 lb |
| EDM120 | AC induction | 120 kW; 160 hp at 1800 RPM | 65 kW; 87 hp | 650 N⋅m; 480 lbf⋅ft | 98 kg 216 lb |

== See also ==
- Solectria Corporation, a competing Massachusetts-based commercial electric vehicle converter
- Jet Industries, a competing Texas-based electric car conversion company in the 70's and 80's
