= Jet Industries =

Company that sold battery electric vehicles

Jet Industries, Inc., located in Austin, Texas, United States, was a company that sold battery electric vehicles during the late 1970s and early 1980s. The vehicles were converted from existing models from manufacturers such as Subaru, Mazda, Ford and Chrysler. Accounts of total vehicle sales vary, but Stan Skokan, the Northern California distributor for Jet Industries, estimated total output at over 1400 vehicles. The company was founded by A. Forbes Crawford and William L. Bales. Bales previously founded Tri-Motor Corp., an electric golf cart company, which he sold in 1960, and then founded a snowmobile company that he sold in 1970, later to become Chaparral Snowmobiles. Jet Industries was incorporated in 1977 and discontinued operations in the early 1980s.

Vehicles that the company sold included:

- Electra-Van 600 (a converted Subaru Sambar 600), powered by a 20-horsepower General Electric motor
- Electra-Van 750 (converted Mazda B2000/Ford Courier pickup trucks), powered by a 30-horsepower motor
- Electrica (converted Ford Escort/Mercury Lynx cars)
- Electrica 007 (converted Dodge Omni 024/Plymouth Horizon TC3 cars). The company claimed these cars had an average range of 50 miles and a top speed of 70 mph.

Other models included the 1000 van (a converted Dodge Van), the 1400 van (a converted Dodge Maxivan), and the 1000P pickup truck.

== See also ==
- Solectria Corporation, electric car conversion company in the late 80's and 90's
- U.S. Electricar, electric car conversion company in the 70's through the 90's
