= BC Research =

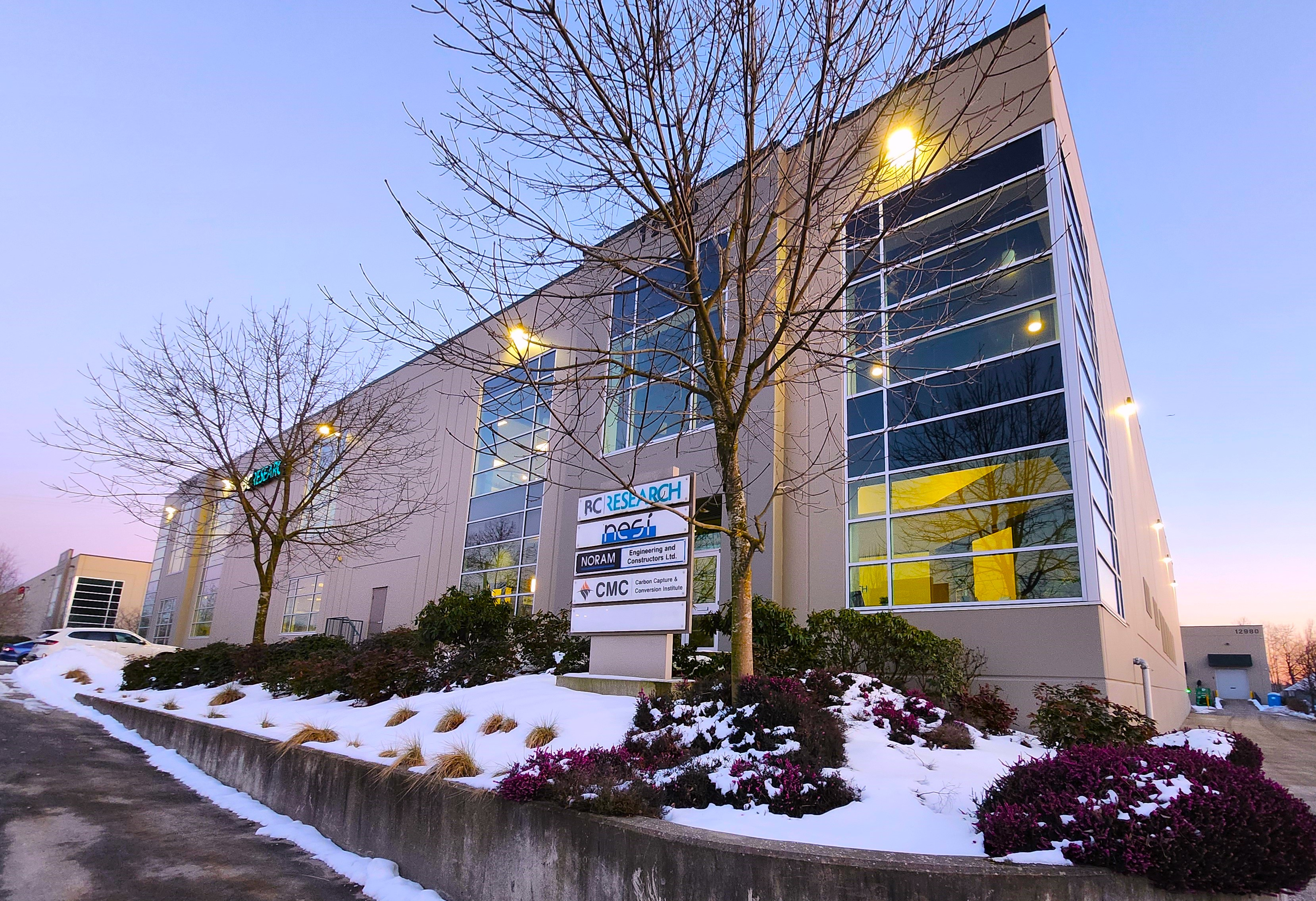
BCRI Technology Commercialization and Innovation Centre

Aerial view of BC Research taken in 1985. The buildings are essentially the same as what they were in 2007 before the facility was demolished. The building on the right is the Ocean Engineering facility which housed two wave pools often used by the film industry.

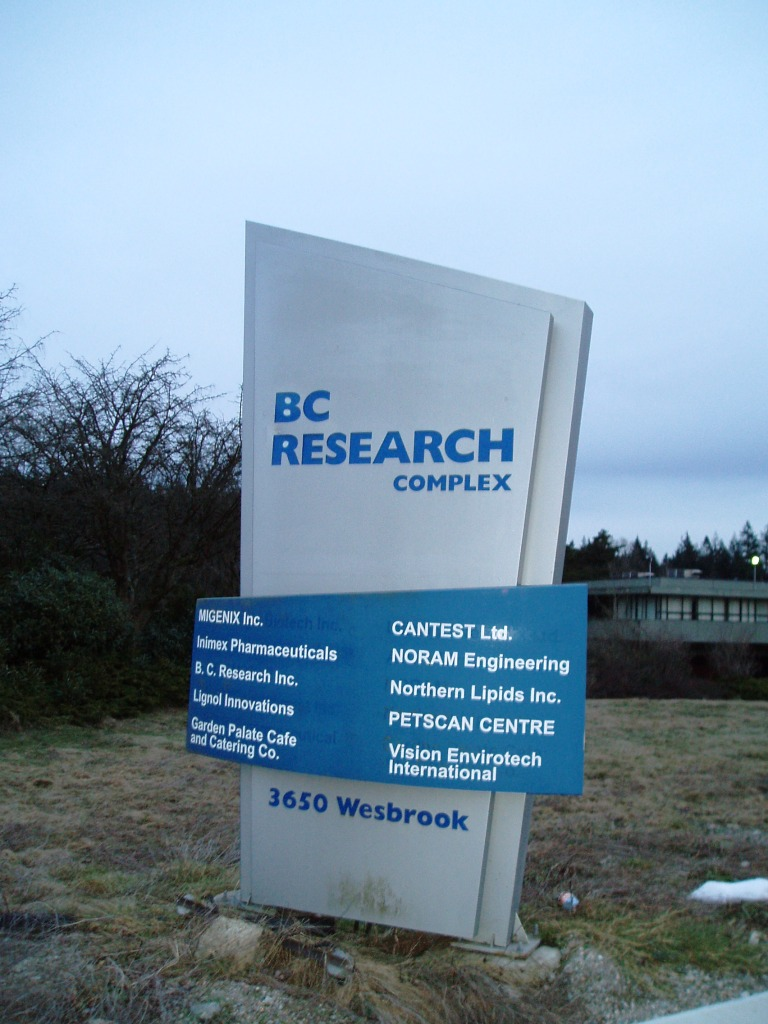
A sign at the closed facility still in place in early 2009

BC Research Inc. is a privately owned Canadian process technology incubator, specializing in custom research, process development and technology commercialization. Headquartered in Vancouver, British Columbia, BC Research operates primarily from their Technology Commercialization and Innovation Centre on Mitchell Island in the Vancouver suburb of Richmond. This 40,000 sq-ft facility includes a 28,000 sq-ft pilot plant development area, 2,500 sq-ft laboratory space, 9,000 sq-ft of office space, as well as a small machine shop and fenced outdoor piloting space. Technologies are scaled up from concept to pilot or demonstration scale in preparation for commercialization. Engineering support is provided by sister companies NORAM Engineering and Constructors Ltd.

Previously, BC Research was located at the BC Research and Innovation Complex at the south end of the University of British Columbia campus. This facility closed in November 2007. The company specialized in consulting and applied research and development in the area of plant biotechnology and environment, health and safety, process and analysis, transportation and ship dynamics.

== History ==
The company can be traced back to 1944 as it developed from the non-profit BC Research Council to a private company in 1993, founded by Dr. Hugh Wynne-Edwards, Ph.D, DSc., FRSC, a member of the Order of Canada, who served as the founding Chief Executive Officer and developed the facility into an incubator in the fields of biotechnology, drug discovery and alternative fuel technologies.

In 2000, BC Research was purchased by Immune Network Ltd and was sold to Cromedica (now PRA International) in July 2001 for a consideration of $8.3 million according to 2001 audited financials published on SEDAR. Its plant biotechnology team was mostly spun off in Silvagen Inc. which specialized in clonal reforestation and which became a part of CellFor. In 1999 Azure Dynamics, a hybrid commercial vehicle systems developer, was formed with some of the transportation team and left the facility in 2004 having gone public in 2001 as Azure Dynamics Corporation. Radient Technologies, specializing in microwave-assisted cannabis extraction, purification and isolation, was also spun off in 2001 as a joint venture with Environment Canada. The remaining laboratory and consulting business functions continued under the name Vizon SciTec until August 2006 when CANTEST Ltd. announced its acquisition from BC Research Inc. which continues as a privately held technology holding company.

Finally in 2010, BC Research Inc. (BCRI), opened again for business in Burnaby, B.C. The Company continued to provide specialized consulting and applied research and development in an expanding number of different technologies and industries, including fluidized beds, storage of energy in batteries, fuel cells, electrochemical cells, corrosion testing and analysis, hydrogen, sulfur, chlorine, nitration, water treatment, and pulp and paper chemistry.

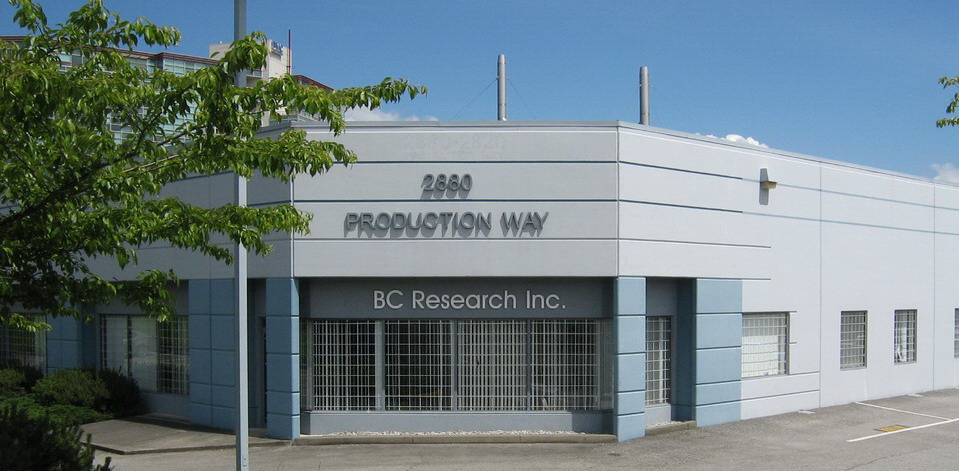
Ex BC Research facility in Burnaby BC (2010-2017)

In 2017, BCRI moved to a newly constructed facility on Mitchell Island in Vancouver B.C. to expand their capabilities. BC Research Inc. is now a wholly owned subsidiary of the NORAM group, a private, vertically integrated portfolio of businesses serving process scale-up, engineering, R&D, pilot plants, demonstration plants, modular plants, custom fabrication, and site assistance. Key sectors of focus include: Hydrogen production and hydrogen purification, electrochemical processes including electrolysis and electrodialysis, thermochemical processes (pyrolysis, gasification, reforming, and combustion), water treatment, bioproducts and green chemistry processes, carbon capture and storage, mineral processing, clean fuels and hydrocarbon processing, lithium processing and production of lithium hydroxide, process design, process and equipment modelling, and chemical process engineering.
