= Solectria Force =

Electric passenger car by Solectria

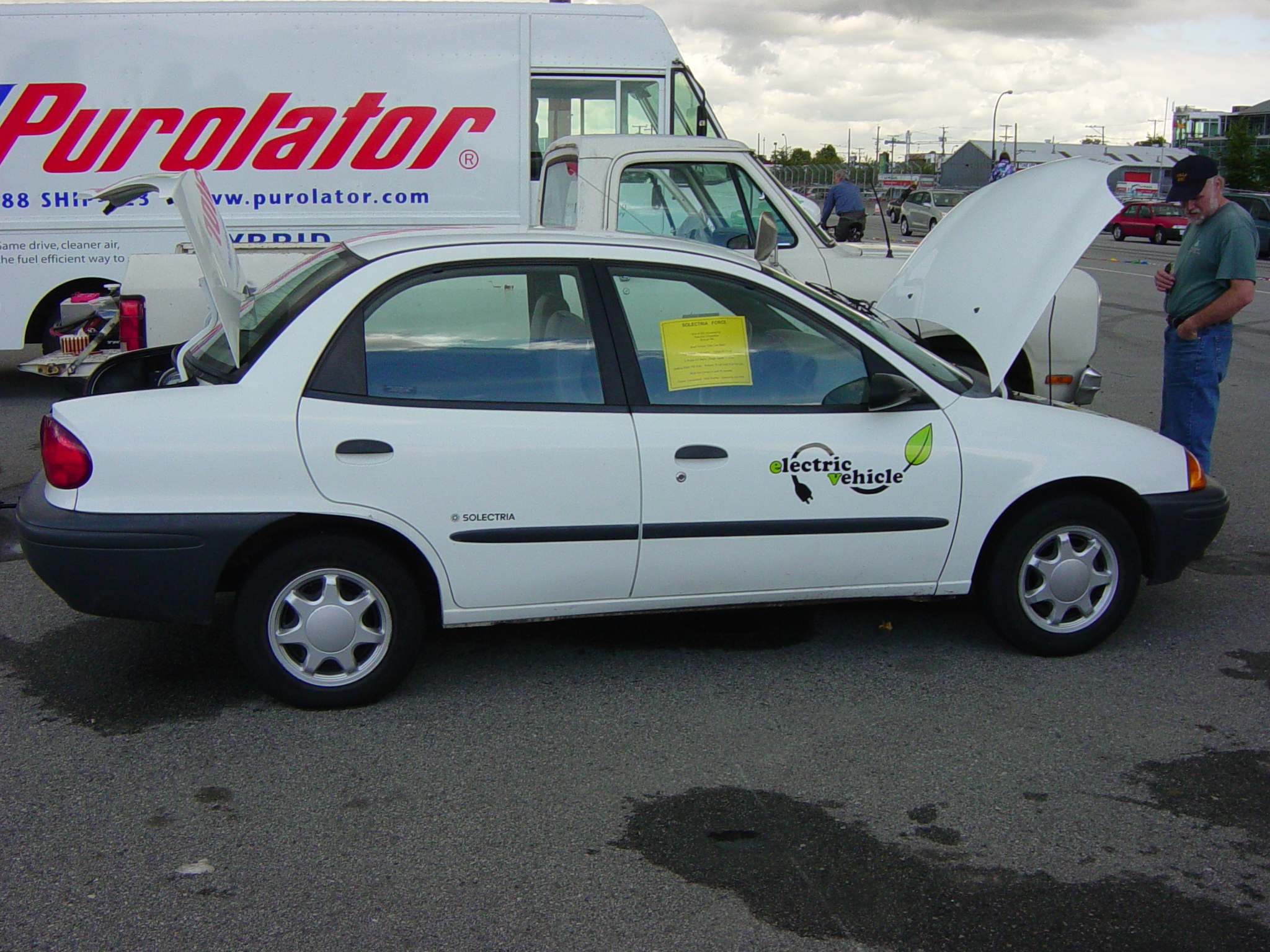

Overview
- Manufacturer: Solectria Corporation
- Model years: 1996
- Assembly: Massachusetts

Body and chassis
- Related: Suzuki Swift / Geo Metro

Dimensions
- Length: 4,166 mm (164 in)
- Width: 1,778 mm (70 in)
- Height: 1,422 mm (56 in)
- Curb weight: 1,116 kg (2,460 lb)

The Solectria Force is a Geo Metro, professionally converted from a new, motorless chassis (known in the industry as a glider) by Solectria Corporation of Wilmington, Massachusetts, starting in 1991, becoming a battery electric vehicle. Solectria subsequently was acquired by Azure Dynamics Corporation in 2004, it is no longer in production. Approximately 400 vehicles were converted in total.

== History ==
The Force was introduced in March 1991, and the first nine were delivered by October to Arizona Public Service, Sacramento Municipal Utility District, and Southern California Edison.

The North Jersey District Water Supply Commission procured a 1996 Solectria Force that is still in service today. The original thirteen 12 volt lead–acid gel cell batteries lasted until April 2011, when they were replaced with nearly 10,000 miles.

In 1997, the base price of the car was $33,995 with lead–acid batteries which gave it a range of 50 miles at 45 miles per hour and a top speed of 70 miles per hour. Solectria also offered the Force with a nickel-metal hydride battery pack with an MSRP $88,895. This battery pack gave the Force a range of 100 miles at 45 miles per hour, and the same top speed as the lead acid model at 70 miles per hour.

The city of Morristown, NJ used Solectria "Force" models as "station cars" in a three-year pilot program ending in 2001.

== Technical ==
For the display card on the example shown below:

- Base vehicle: 1996 Geo Metro
- Top speed 110 km/h (68 mph)
- Range 60 km (37 mi)-70 km (43 mi)
- Three phase AC motor
- Single-speed gearbox
- 156 volt battery pack (thirteen 12 volt lead–acid gel cells)
- Zero emissions at the tailpipe

In 1994, the Force was available as a four-seat or two-seat model, with the two-seat model gaining additional range. The standard storage battery used lead–acid chemistry, and a nickel-cadmium battery was optional. The base price of the four-seat, lead–acid Force was US$26,050 (equivalent to $57,000 in 2025), rising to US$28,280 (equivalent to $61,000 in 2025) for the two-seat, lead–acid version and US$59,350 (equivalent to $129,000 in 2025) for the two-seat, NiCd battery. Rated range varied from 60 to 120 mi (97 to 193 km). By 1998, the NiCd battery option had been dropped in favor of the NiMH battery. The traction motor had an output that varied by the battery pack fitted; at 156 V, output was 38 kW (51 hp), increasing to 42 kW (56 hp) at 180 V. The observed energy consumption was 137 Wh/mi (246 mpg‑e) at a steady 45 mph (72 km/h).

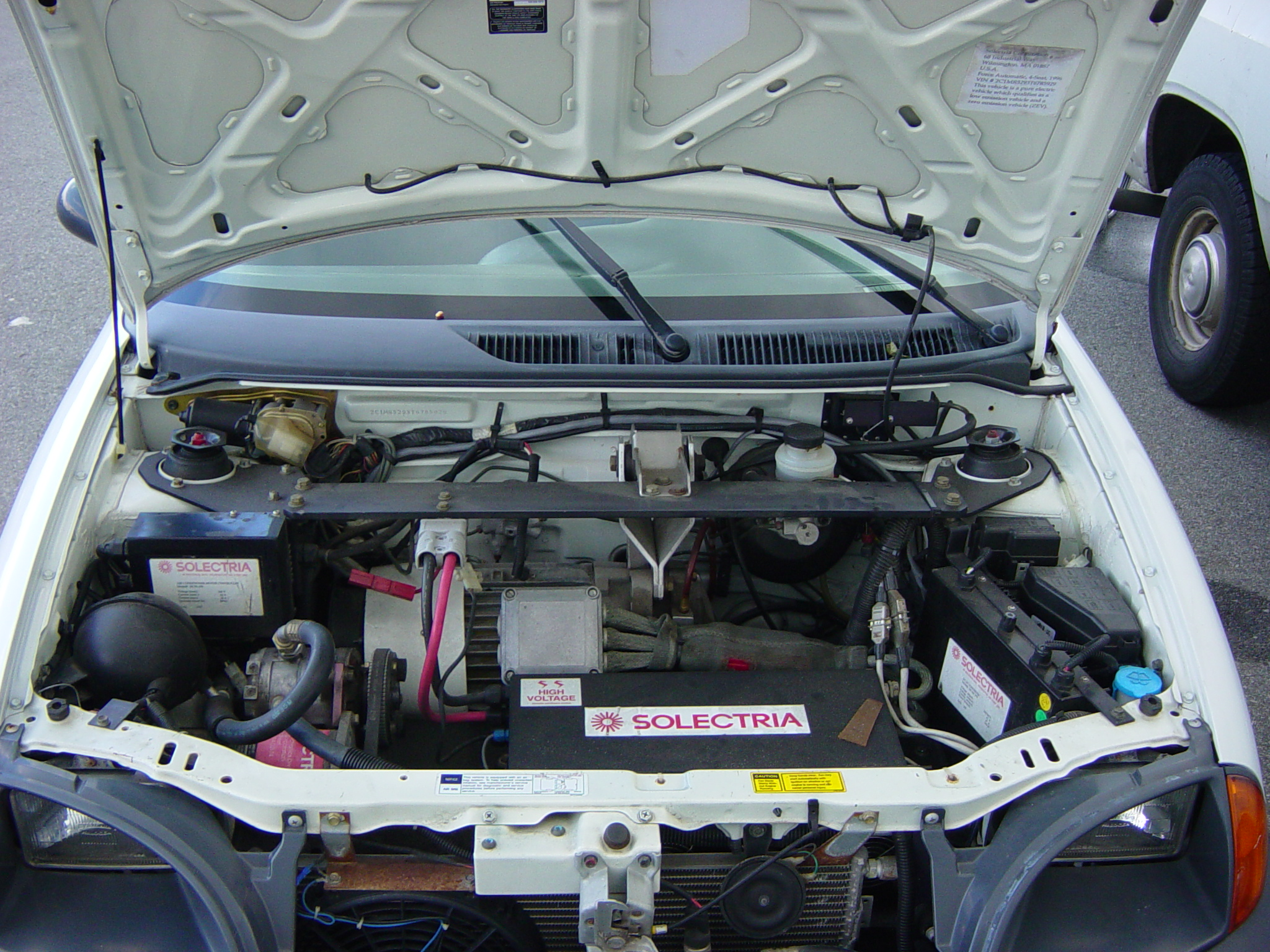
Front compartment

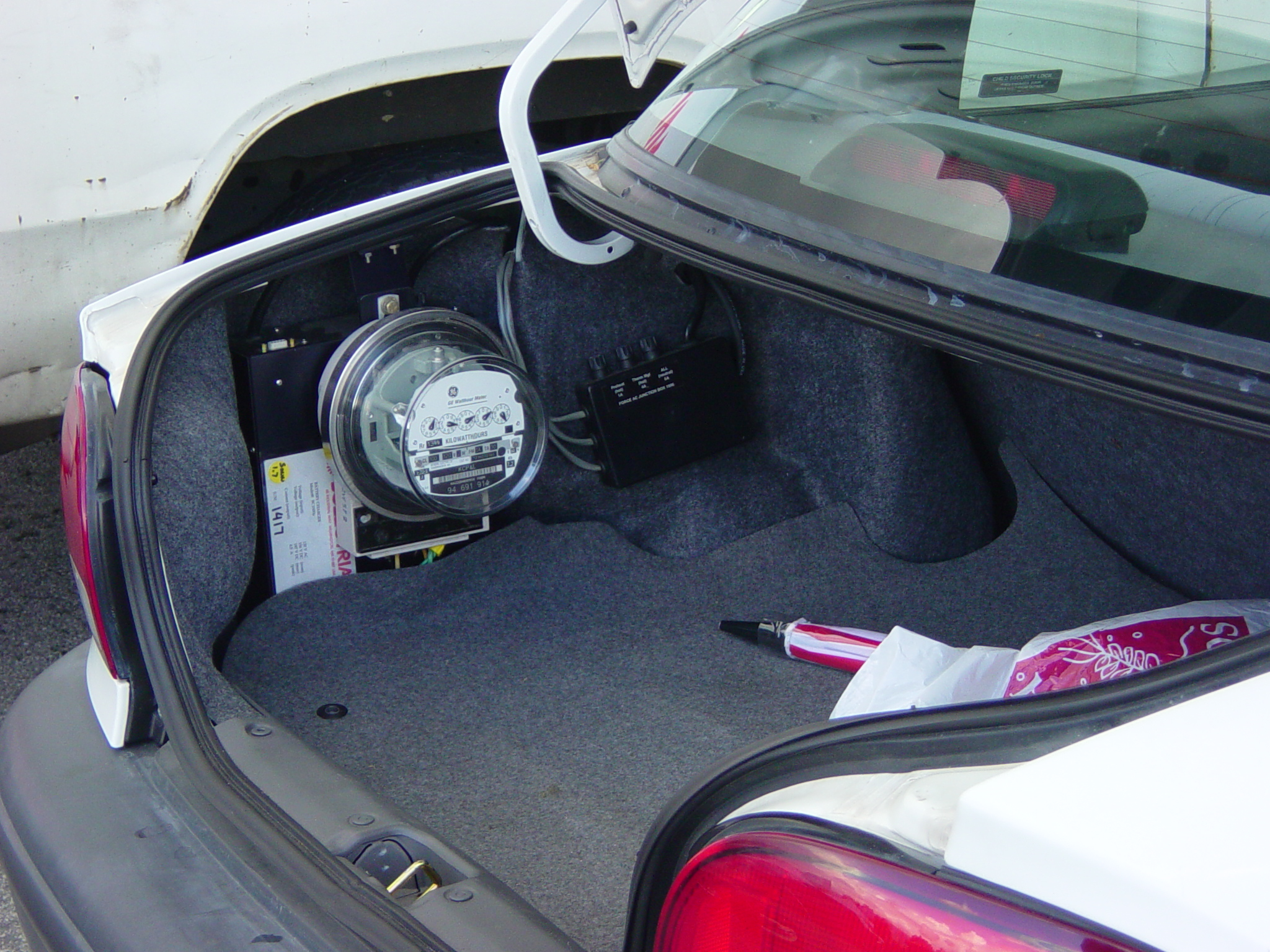
Rear compartment

== See also ==
- Solectria Sunrise
