= Geo Metro =

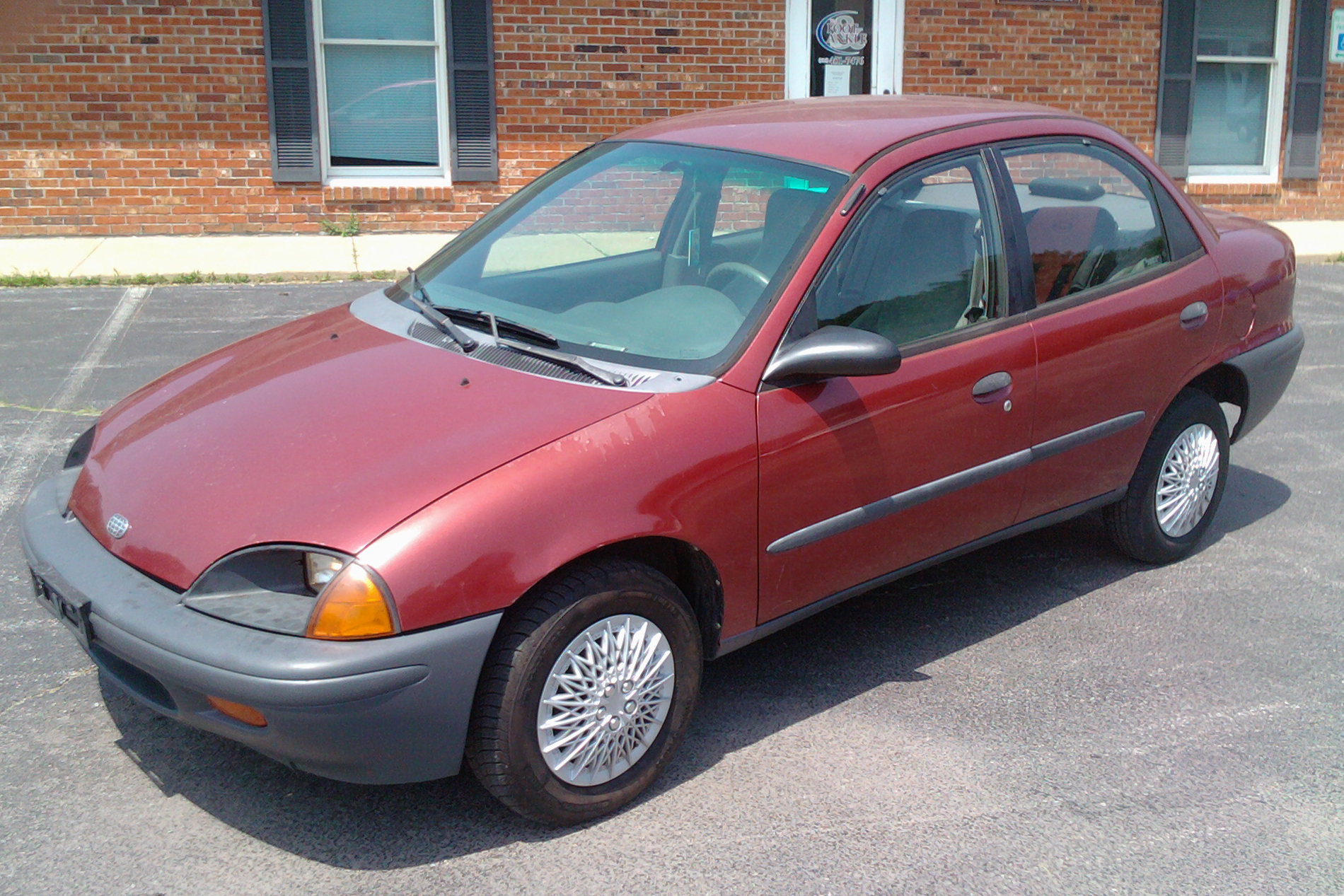

Overview
- Manufacturer: CAMI Automotive (1989–1994); Geo (1989–1997); General Motors (1995–2001)
- Production: 1989–2001

Body and chassis
- Class: Subcompact car

Chronology
- Predecessor: Chevrolet Chevette; Chevrolet Sprint/Sprint Metro
- Successor: Chevrolet Aveo/Sonic (for Chevrolet Metro)

The Geo Metro was a variation of the Suzuki Cultus car available in North America from 1989 through 2001 as a joint effort of General Motors (GM) and Suzuki. In the US, the Metro carried a Geo nameplate from 1989 through 1997, and a Chevrolet nameplate from 1998 to 2001. It evolved with the Cultus and its siblings over 13 years, three generations and four body styles: three-door hatchback, four-door sedan, five-door hatchback and two-door convertible—and was ultimately replaced in the General Motors lineup by a family of vehicles based on the Daewoo Kalos, the Chevrolet Aveo.

From 1985 through 1989, Cultus-derived models sold in North America—under the nameplates Suzuki Forsa, Suzuki Swift, Chevrolet Sprint, Geo Metro and Pontiac Firefly—were sourced from Suzuki's facilities in Japan. Beginning in 1990, all North American M-cars were produced at CAMI Automotive, a 50–50 joint venture between General Motors and Suzuki in Ingersoll, Ontario, Canada, although Japanese production continued to source Canada bound sedan models. CAMI never reached its intended Metro/Firefly/Swift capacity. In response to the waning popularity of smaller automobiles in the North American markets, Chevrolet/Geo had sold only 55,600 Metros in 1997, off from 88,700 the year before. While at its peak, Canadian Swift/Metro/Firefly production reached more than 100,000 vehicles a year, the number fell to just 32,000 in 2000. In April 2001, CAMI confirmed that it had ended production of the Metro at its Ontario production facility.

Beginning in late 2003 as a model year 2004 car, the Daewoo Kalos, marketed variously as the Chevrolet Aveo, Pontiac Wave and Suzuki Swift+, effectively replaced the Metro/Firefly, although the Aveo is more of a Daewoo Lanos replacement as opposed to the Metro, the same time when Daewoo closed majority of its dealerships outside South Korea in 2002.

The Suzuki Swift was replaced by the Suzuki Aerio hatchback in 2002, although the Aerio also replaced the Suzuki Esteem.

== Chevrolet Sprint ==
GM began marketing the first generation Cultus in North America as the Chevrolet Sprint. The car was also sold as the Suzuki Forsa, and as the Pontiac Firefly in Canada. The Chevrolet Sprint was sold only in the Western United States until 1986, when nationwide sales in the US commenced. In 1987, the "Metro" name first appeared on a model of the naturally aspirated Chevrolet Sprint: the "Chevrolet Sprint Metro."

== First generation (1989–1994) ==
Production of the first Geo Metro models, equivalent to the second generation Suzuki Cultus, began at Suzuki's plant in Hamamatsu, Japan, in late 1988. In 1989, it debuted and replaced the Chevrolet Sprint in the United States. Canadian models continued with the Chevrolet Sprint and Pontiac Firefly nameplates, while the second generation Suzuki Swift replaced the Forsa nameplate. This generation was also marketed by Suzuki as the "Swift" in the United States. The Metro/Swift/Sprint lineup received a facelift, while the Firefly was temporarily discontinued. The first generation Metro was replaced by a rebodied model unique to the North American market.

Some pre-production models were handmade, and featured 5-digit odometers.

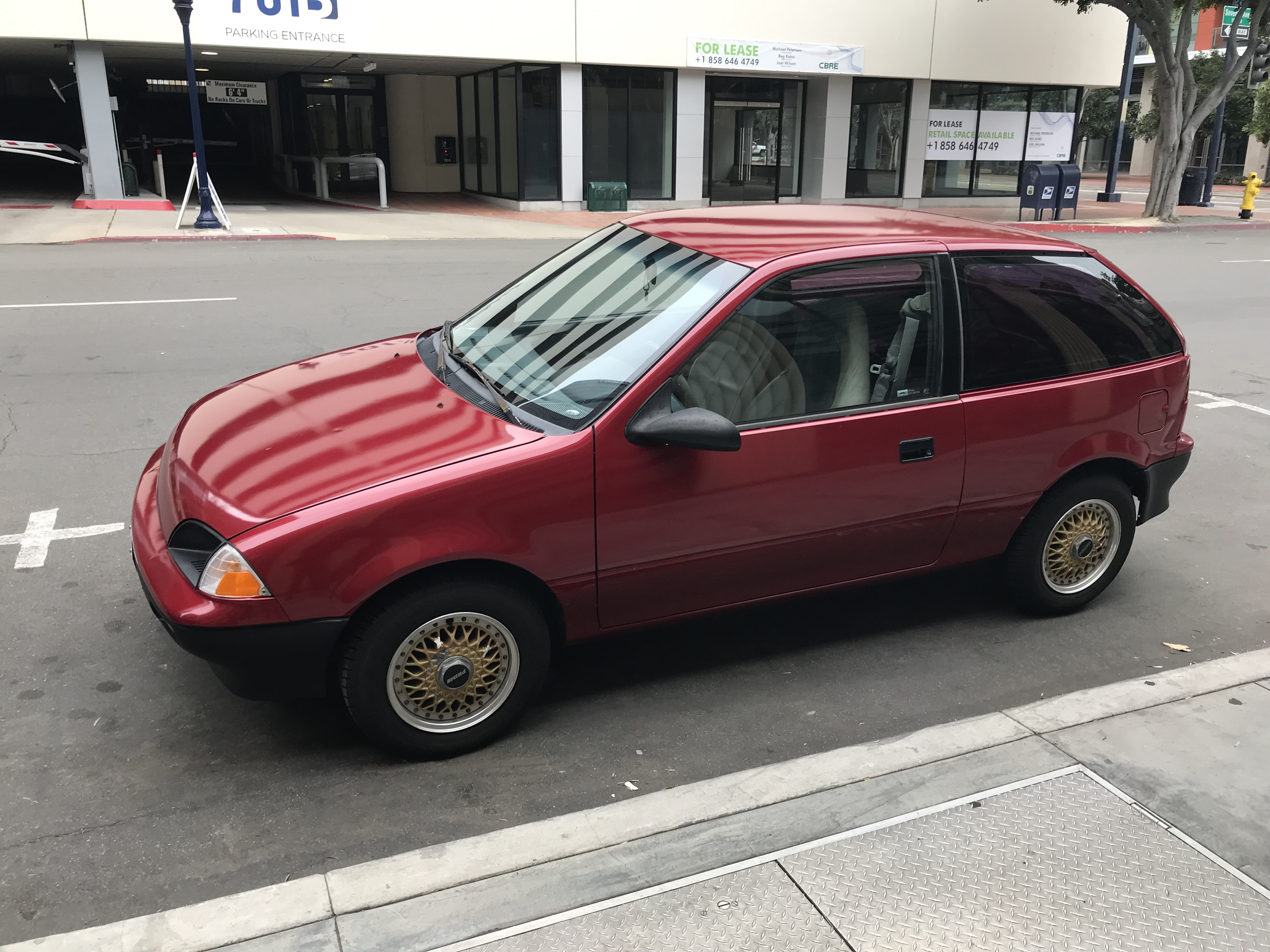
1990–1991 Metro Hatchback

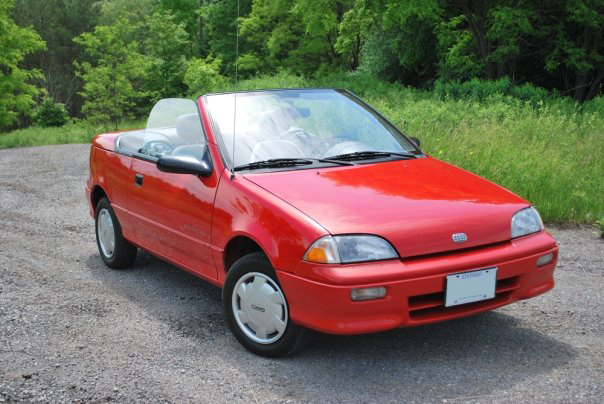
1992 Metro convertible

== Second generation (1995–2001) ==
Second generation
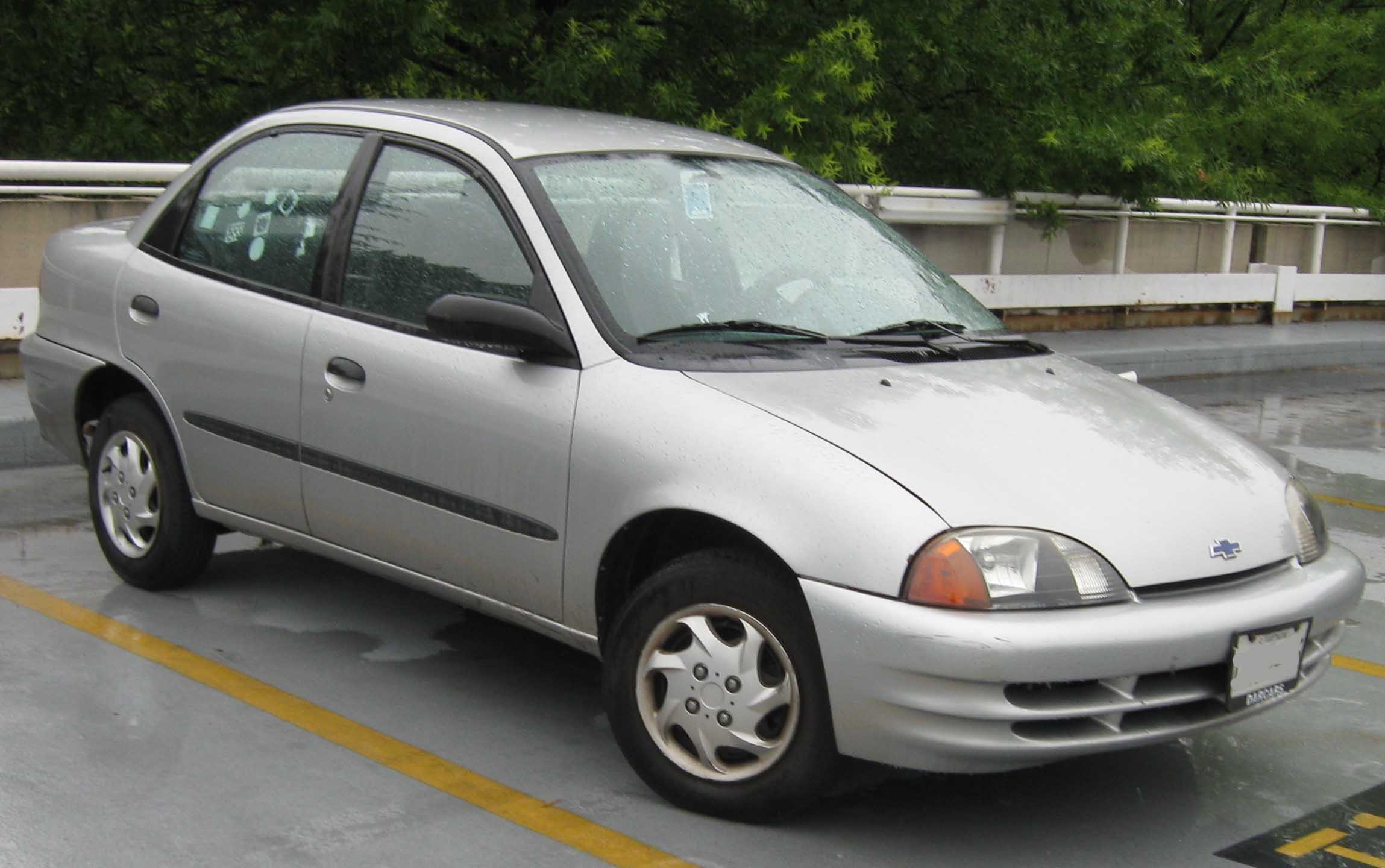

Overview
- Also called: Geo Metro (1995–1997); Chevrolet Metro (1998–2001); Pontiac Firefly (Canada); Suzuki Swift
- Production: 1994–2001
- Model years: 1995–2001
- Assembly: Ingersoll, Canada

Body and chassis
- Body style: 3-door hatchback 4-door sedan
- Layout: Transverse front-engine, front-wheel-drive
- Platform: M platform
- Related: Solectria Force

Powertrain
- Engine: 1.0 L LP2 I3; 1.3 L L72/LY8 I4
- Transmission: 5-speed manual 3-speed MX17 automatic

Dimensions
- Wheelbase: 93.1 in (2,365 mm)
- Length: 149.4 in (3,795 mm) (hatchback); 164.0 in (4,166 mm) (sedan)
- Width: 62.6 in (1,590 mm)
- Height: 54.7 in (1,389 mm) (hatchback); 55.4 in (1,407 mm) (sedan)

In 1995, the second generation of the Sprint/Metro line in North America—which was the third generation North American "Cultus"—was introduced as a three-door hatchback and four-door sedan, using an adaptation of the longer wheelbase platform from the second generation Cultus for both body configurations. Also designed at GM's Design Center, it carried styling cues similar from the bigger Chevrolet Cavalier and was built on the Suzuki developed M platform with Suzuki drivetrains. These models were marketed only in North America, carrying the nameplates Geo Metro (rebranded the Chevrolet Metro starting in the 1998 model year), Pontiac Firefly, and Suzuki Swift—and sourced only from CAMI Automotive. Thus this version was never sold as a Cultus, which was replaced by the Cultus Crescent in Japan. Production ended after model year 2001.

The Chevrolet Metro was used in the 17th Biennale of Sydney (2010) exhibition in an experiment made by Cai Guo-Qiang, a Chinese artist from Fujian, where nine Chevrolet Metros were suspended in the air through animation.

Comparison of Generation II/I 3-door hatchback interior dimensions:

| | Gen I | Gen II |
|---|---|---|
| Front Headroom (in.) | 37.80 | 39.10 |
| Rear Headroom (in.) | 36.50 | 36.00 |
| Front Legroom (in.) | 42.50 | 42.50 |
| Rear Legroom (in.) | 29.80 | 32.80 |

The second generation Metro featured two engine options. The three-cylinder, 1.0-liter throttle body injected engine, still used on base models, was available for non-LSi models in 1997. The 1.0-liter became the last engine on a vehicle available in the US to use TBI. This generation also offered a revised 1.3-liter inline four-cylinder engine used in the Pontiac Firefly, with multi-point fuel injection (with hydraulic lifters and lash adjusters, and a 30,000-mile service interval). The 1.3-liter inline-four engine offered 70 hp (52 kW), and was the same engine that had been in use in the Suzuki Swift (except for the GT models) in prior years. LSi models produced after 1997 featured the four-cylinder engine with a sixteen-valve head instead of the eight valves of the earlier design, yet was still a SOHC design. It produced 79 hp (59 kW).

Contemporary Suzuki Swifts were available with only the four-cylinder, and only as a hatchback. The hatchback body configuration featured a three-inch lower liftover height compared to the previous generation model. Safety equipment included optional anti-lock brakes, safety cage construction with deformable front and rear crush zones and five structural crossbars engineered to spread side impact loads throughout the car's structure, steel side impact door safety beams, and daytime running lights (the second generation Metro was the second GM car to offer DRLs in the United States—the 1995 Chevrolet Corsica was the first)—and dual frontal airbags. The Saturn S-series had DRLs beginning in 1994.

A new, one-piece instrument panel was mounted to one of the five crossmembers with a new, full seal filling the gap between the instrument panel and the dash. The sedan and coupe chassis were 20% and 5% stiffer respectively than the previous generation 5-door and coupe Metros, and at the time of its introduction, the Metro was the smallest car in the world to meet the impending 1997 North American side impact standards. The revised sedan was also introduced in the United States, replacing the 5-door hatchback. This generation featured a coefficient of drag of 0.32.

Its twins, Pontiac Firefly and Suzuki Swift featured the same redesign. At the introduction of this generation, GM arranged for a car carrier with 1995 Metros to drive to college campuses across the country. Local writers took a half-day seminar at "Metro University" with the head product planner and senior members of the engineering, assembly, and marketing teams.

At the time this generation was introduced, 41 percent of Metro buyers were first-car buyers, 62 percent of the buyers were female, and the median age of a Metro buyer was 37.

The American Council for an Energy-Efficient Economy (ACEEE) named this generation of Chevrolet Metro and Suzuki Swift as the top two gasoline-fueled vehicles within their Top 12 Greenest Vehicles in 1998 and 1999. ACEEE assigns a Green Score to each vehicle make and model sold in the US, based on the vehicles' exhaust emissions, fuel economy and other specifications.

- 1996 – OBD-II (On-Board Diagnostics, Second generation) was added to Metro models.
- 1997 – The last year for the Geo brand. The Metro returned in 1998 with a Chevrolet nameplate.
- 1998 – The Metro now carried the Chevrolet nameplate, along with new front and rear fascias and a SOHC 16v design I-4 1.3L engine with a horsepower increase of 12%. Electronic ignition replaced the distributor, and MPFI (Multiport Fuel Injection) replaced the TBI (Throttle Body Injection). The new motor offered more HP, torque, and higher fuel economy. This I-4 engine replaced the older 8v 4 cylinder, but the 3-cylinder engine remained unchanged.
- 2001 – The Metro's final year. The only model available this year is the four-door LSi sedan. The Metro continued on sale in Canada. General Motors announces that the Metro would not be included in the 2002 Chevrolet model lineup. CAMI Automotive manufactures the last Metro, a red sedan, on April 26, 2001.

Solectria Corporation, based in Massachusetts, converted examples of the first and second generation Geo Metro to electric operation. Approximately 500 examples of 1996 and 1997 models were converted to electric operation—the bare vehicles were provided by GM without engines. Called the Solectria Force and Solectria EV, the converted vehicles featured 3 phase AC induction motors and regenerative braking. The battery pack consists of 13 Group 27 Deka Dominator Sealed Gel Lead Acid modules.

| | Nameplate | Market | Body |
|---|---|---|---|
| 1995–2000 | Suzuki Swift | N. America | 3 |
| 1995–2000 | Pontiac Firefly | Canada | 3/4 |
| 1995–1997 | Geo Metro | N. America | 3/4 |
| 1998–2001 | Chevrolet Metro | N. America | 3/4 |

3= 3-dr hatchback
4= 4-dr sedan

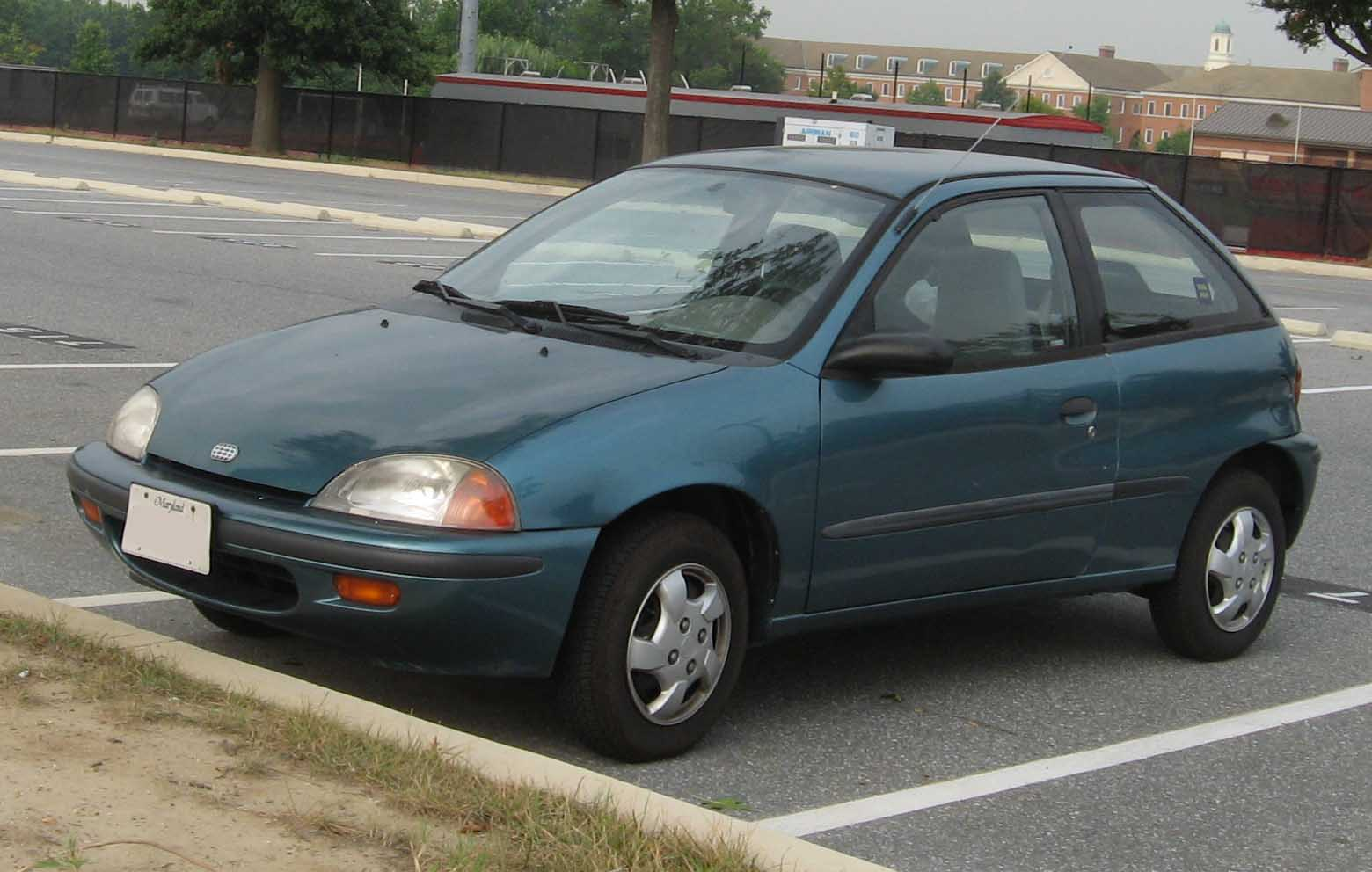
Geo Metro 3-Door, Gen II

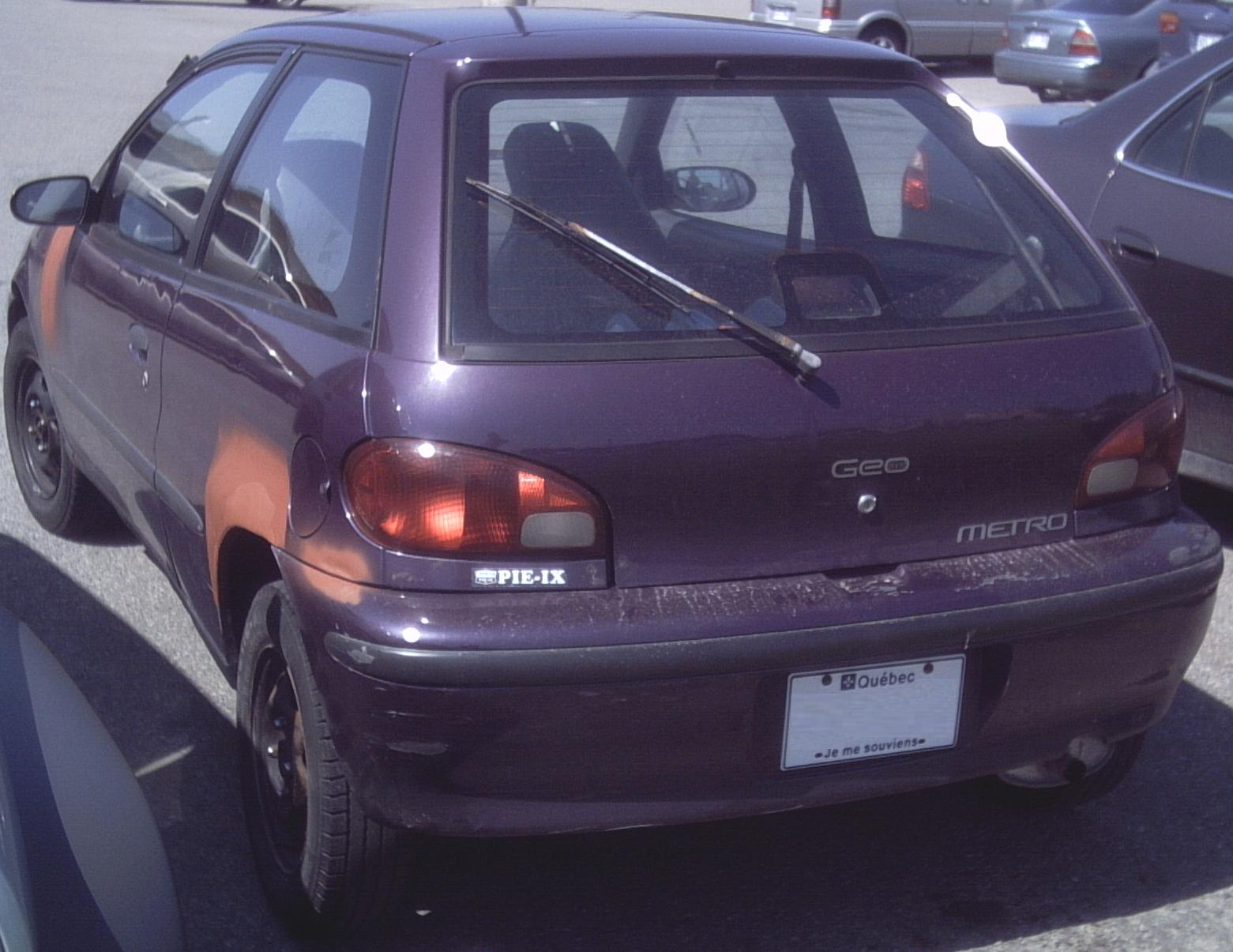
Rear of a 1995 Geo Metro hatchback

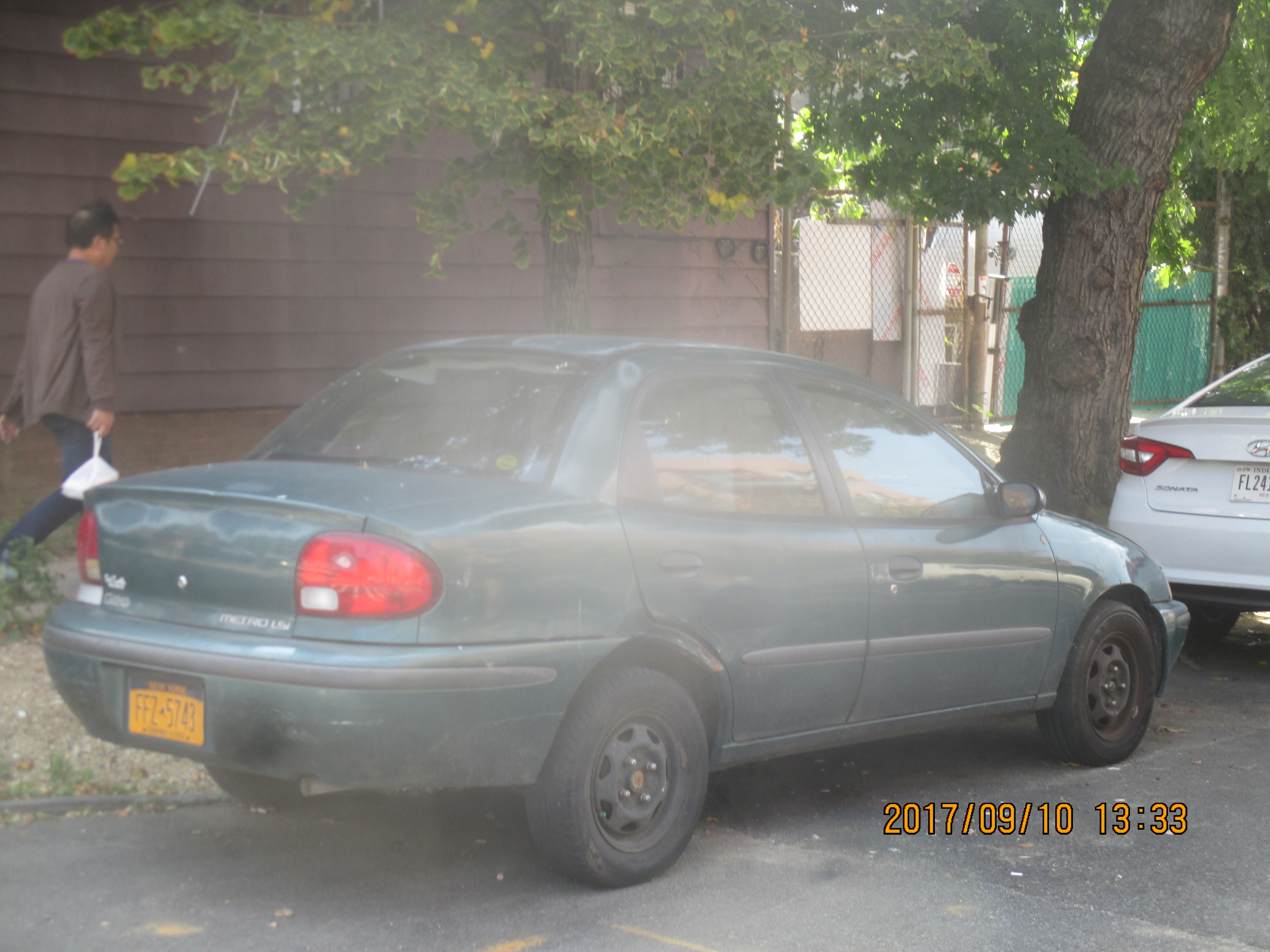
1997 Gen II Geo Metro LSI Sedan

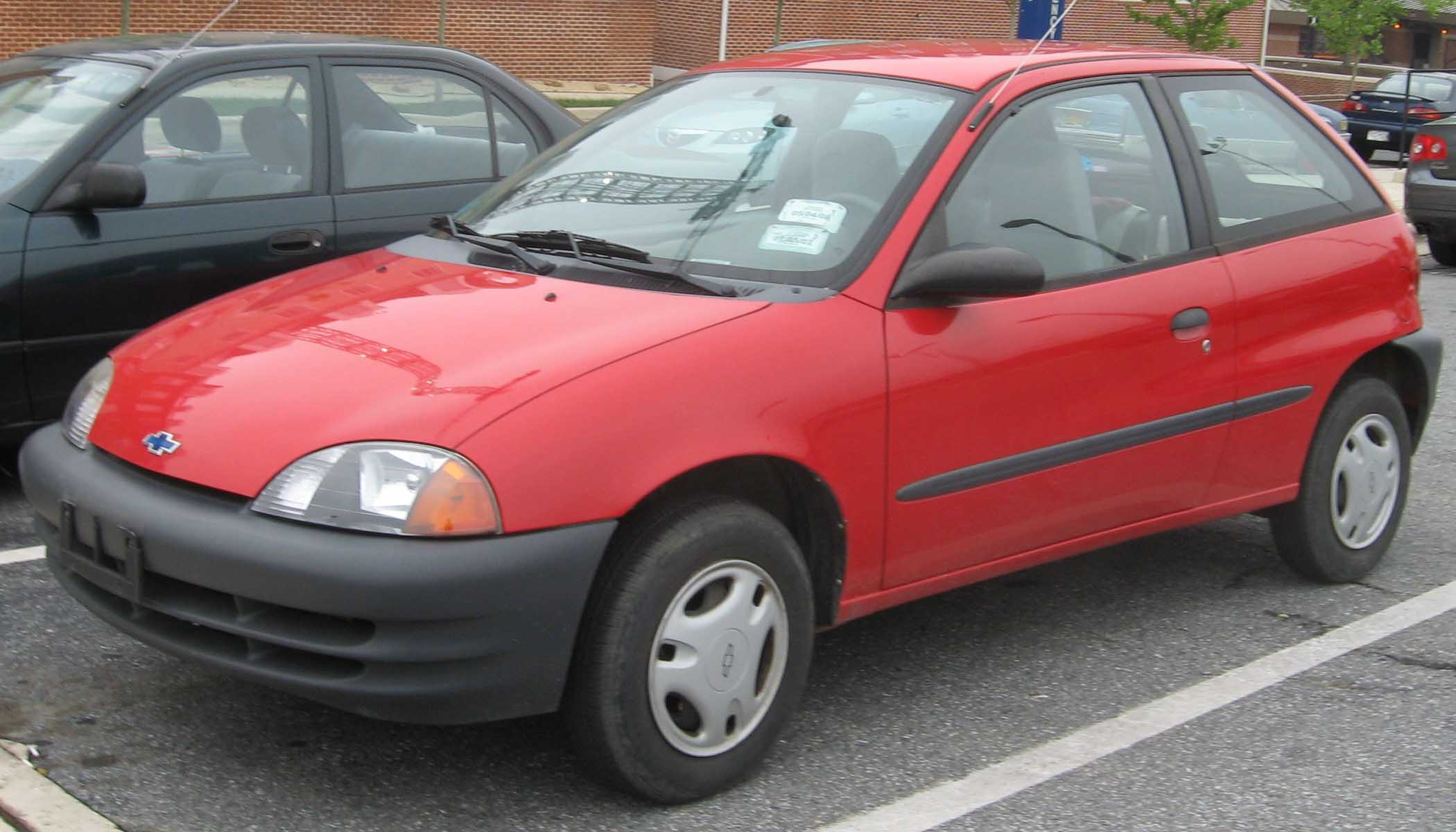
Chevrolet Metro hatchback, front view

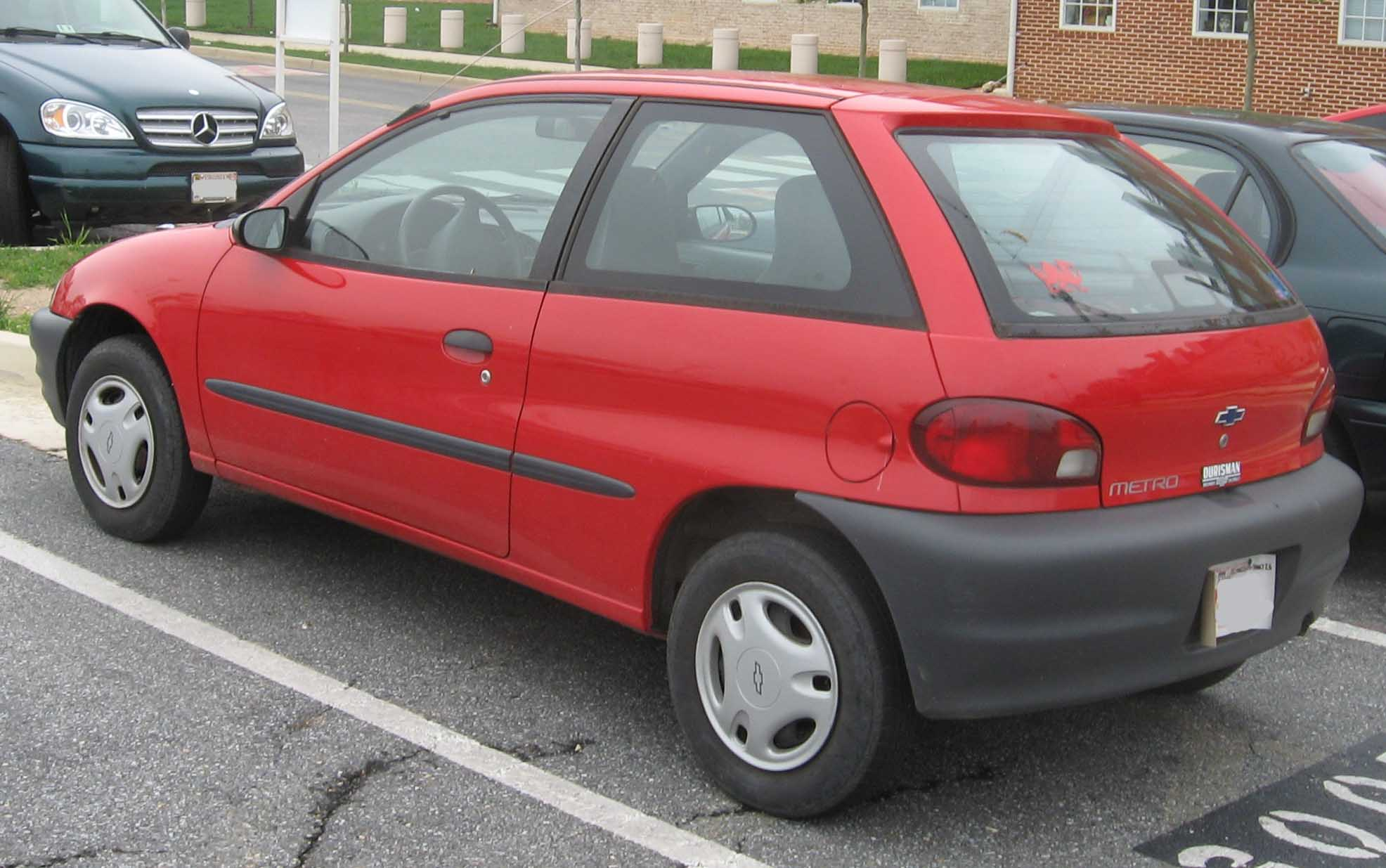
Chevrolet Metro hatchback, rear view

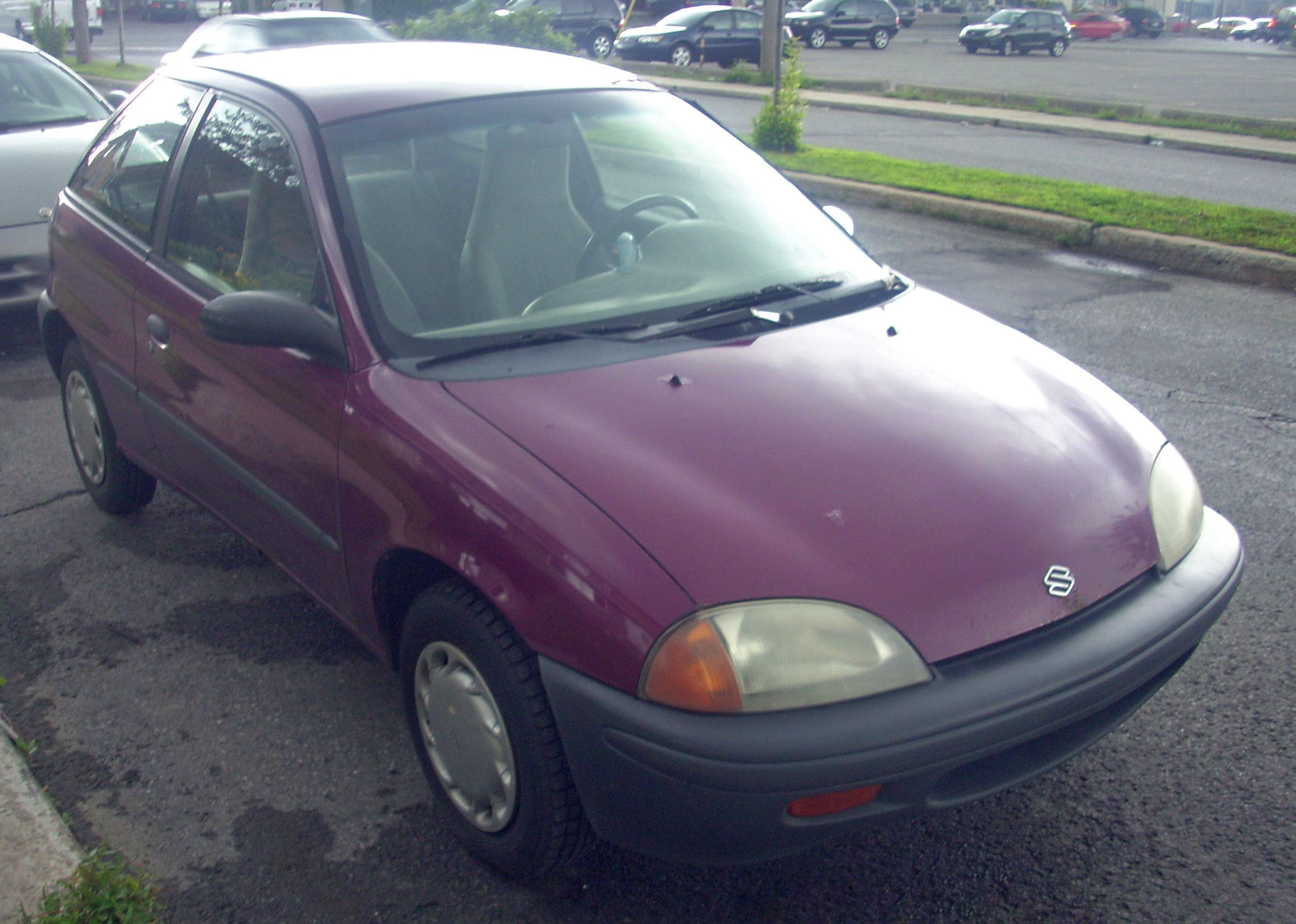
'95 - '97 Suzuki Swift, front

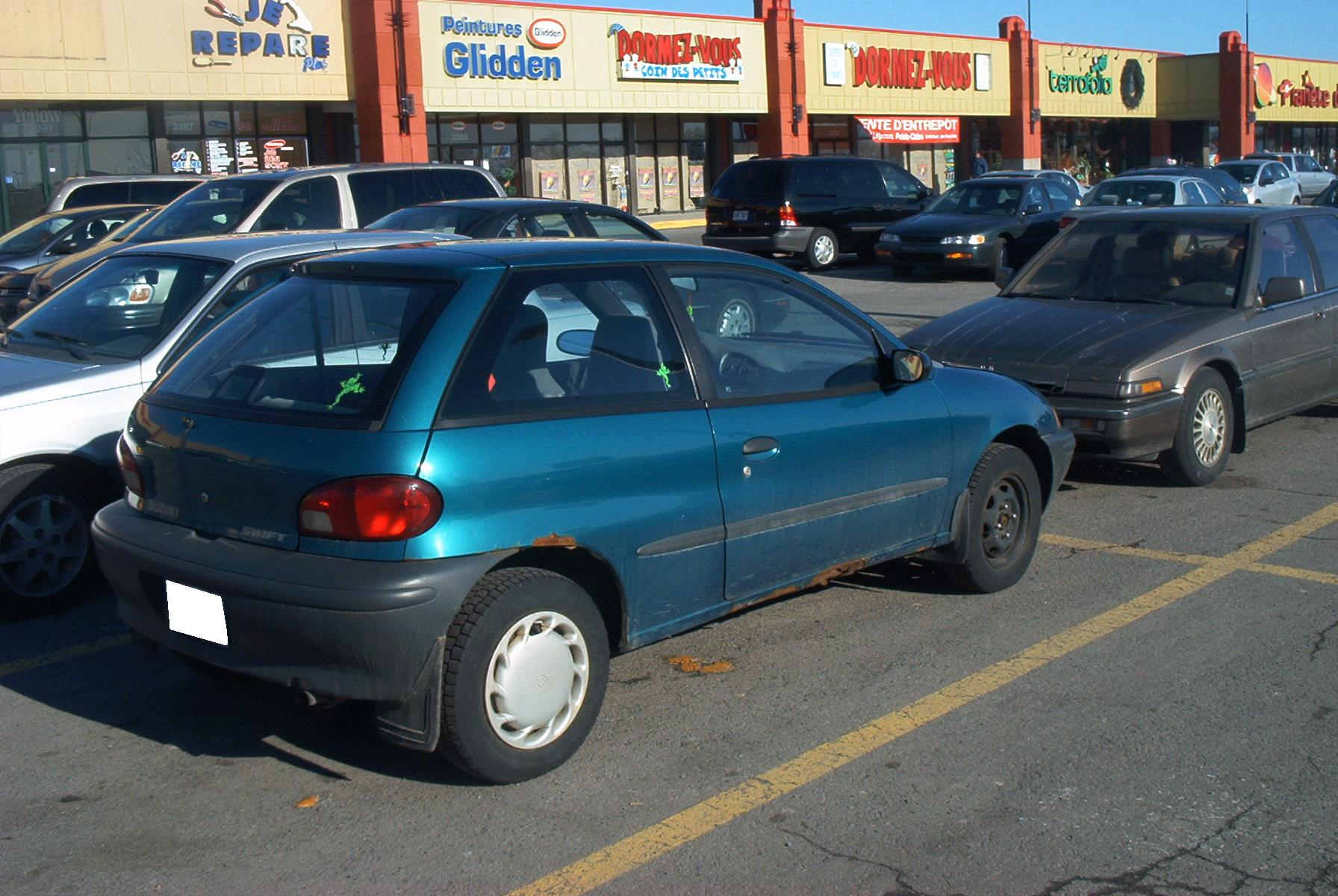
'95 - '01 Suzuki Swift, rear

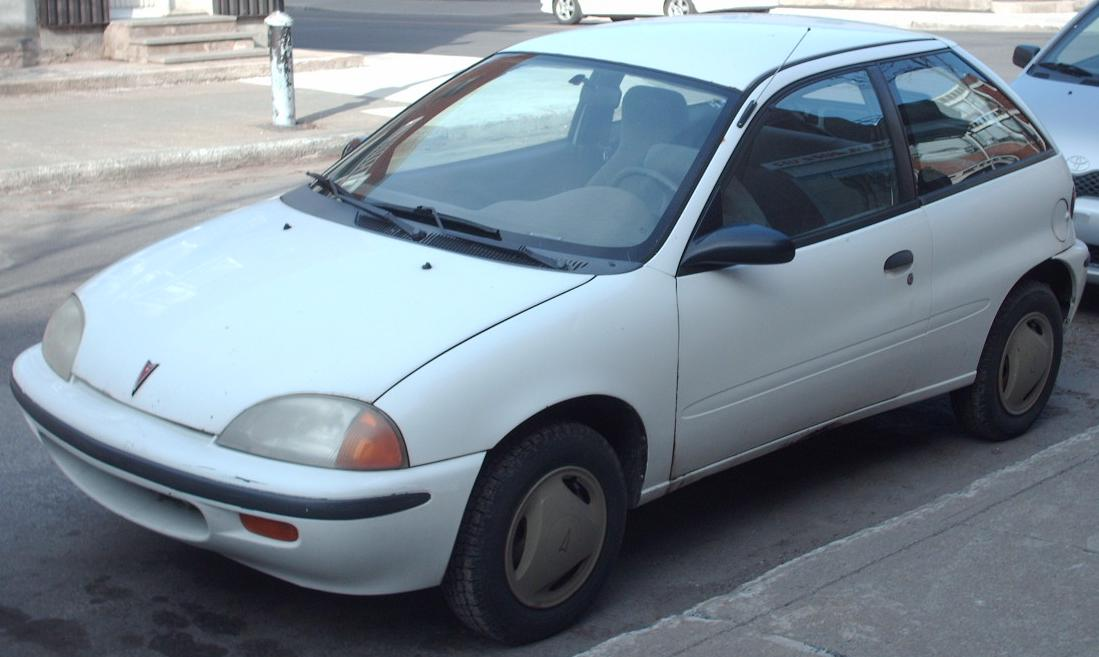
1995–2001 Pontiac Firefly 3dr hatchback, Gen II

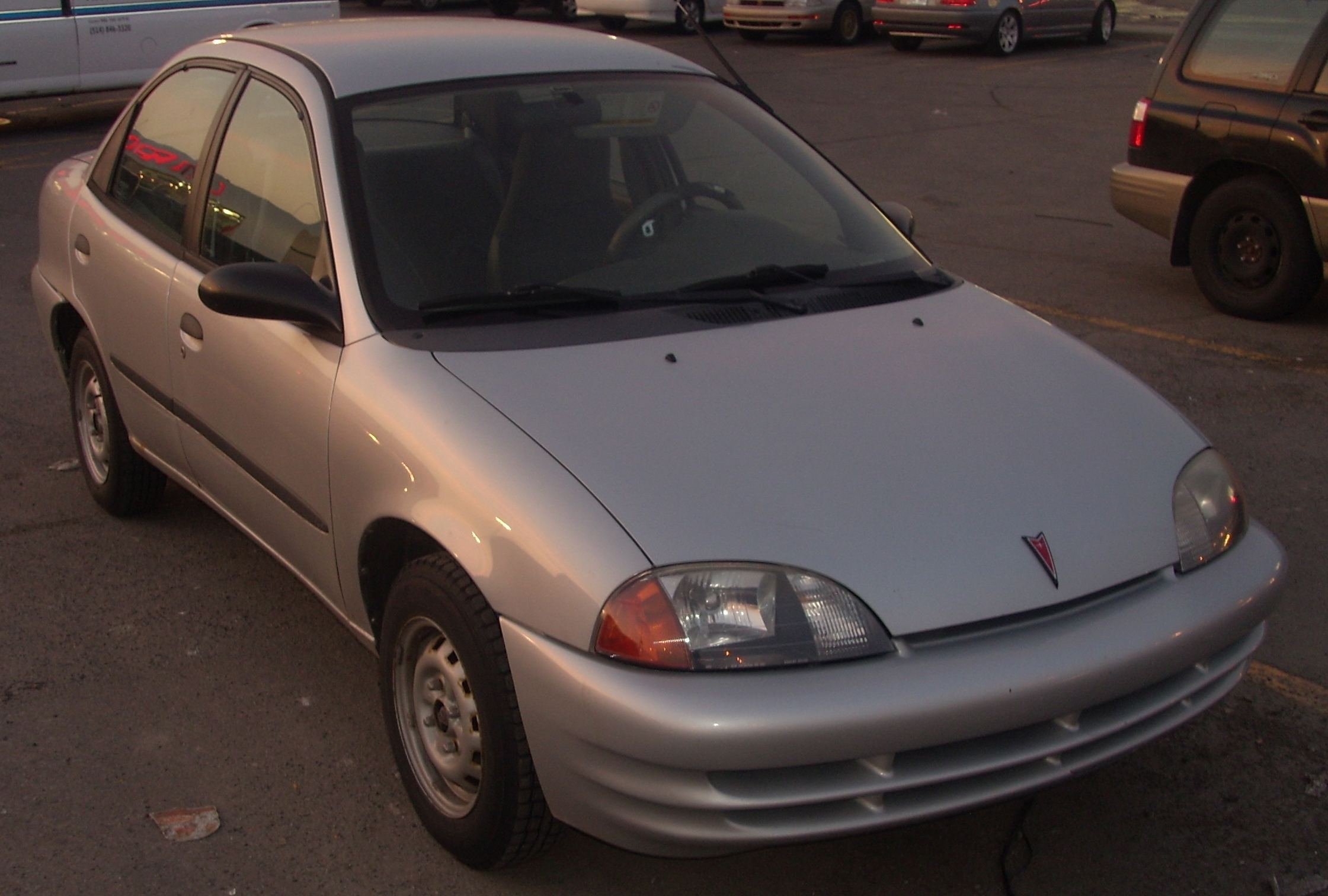
1998–2001 Pontiac Firefly sedan, Gen II

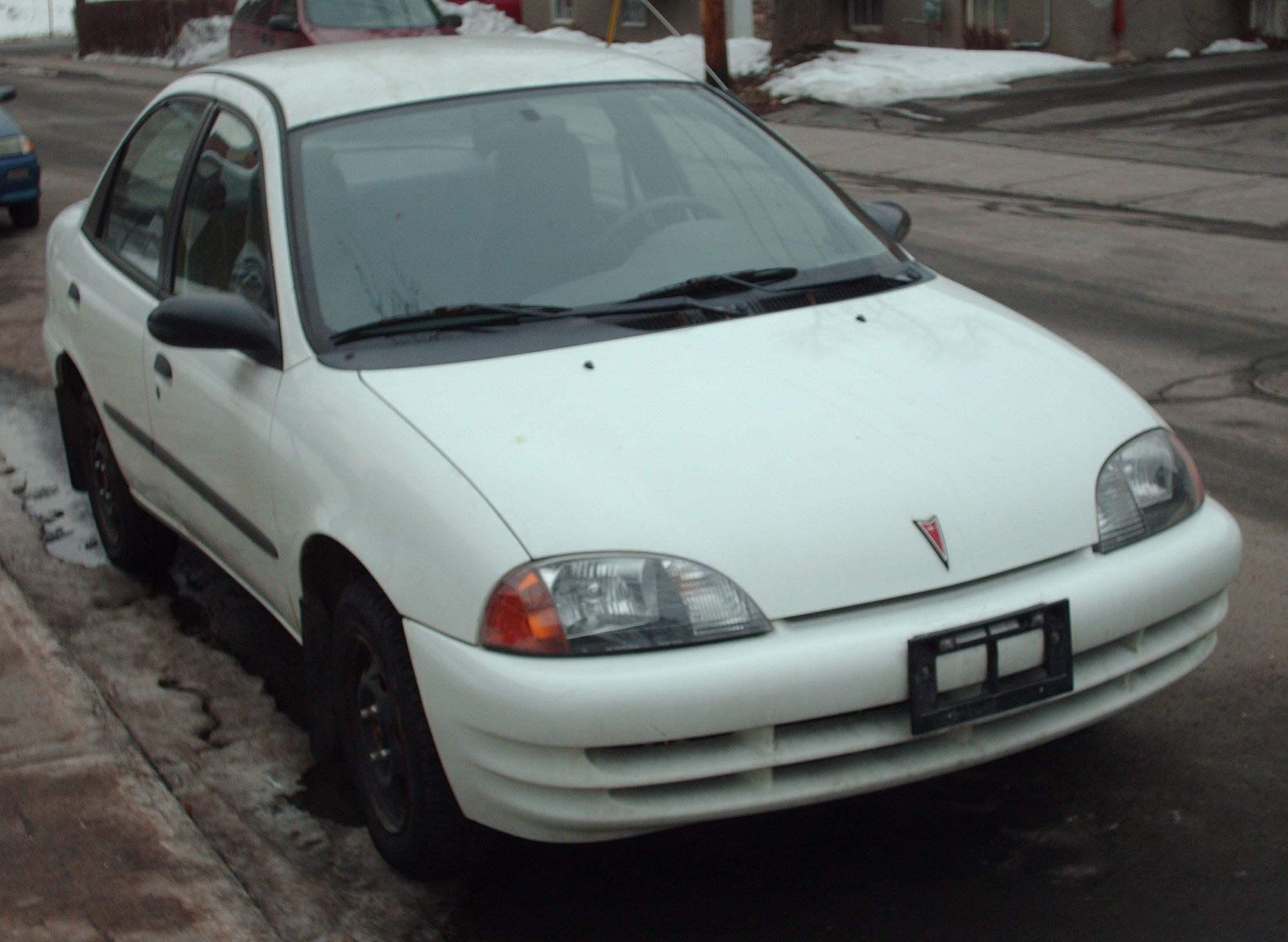
1995–2001 Pontiac Firefly sedan.

=== Safety ===
US second generation models received the following NHTSA's New Car Assessment Program ratings:

- Front Impact, Driver:
- Front Impact, Passenger:

Test numbers indicate the chance of serious injury: 4 = 10–20%

- See NHTSA Test Results: 1995 Geo Metro

== Fuel economy ==
"As gas prices spike and consumers increasingly look for ways to get to work more efficiently, heavy media coverage has spurred interest in one particular old car: the Geo Metro."

— US News, 2008

In North America, the Metro received increased interest as a used car in 2008, by virtue of its fuel mileage and rising fuel costs.

Partially because of the renewed interest in the Metro, the July 2009 issue of Car and Driver included a base model 1998 Chevrolet Metro 3-door hatchback among vehicles tested for fuel efficiency alongside two hybrid models: the redesigned Honda Insight and Toyota Prius models. Car and Driver yet jokingly ridiculed the Metro's age and equipment, docking seven points from its overall score for its lack of amenities and mentioning that it was originally sold brand-new without hubcaps. Regardless, the Metro tied the Prius for best overall fuel economy at 42 mpg_{‑US} (5.6 L/100 km). The vehicle finished third overall behind the Insight and Prius.

The vehicle is often used as a test-bed to field various fuel efficiency technology, such as the 2007 university based Cornell 100+ MPG Team. It was also converted into a salt racer in 2012 by Clay Pitkin.
