= Tour de Sol =

Solar powered vehicles

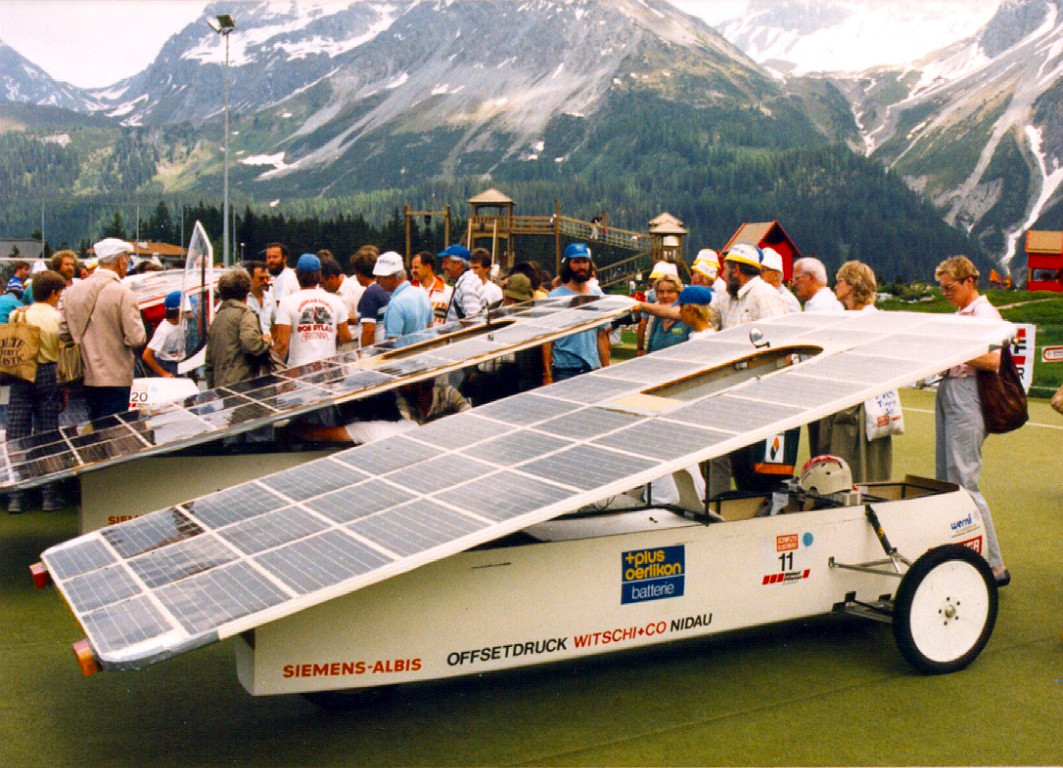
1987

The Tour de Sol in Switzerland was the first rally for solar powered vehicles. It was carried out annually from 1985 to 1993. The first event started on June 25 in Romanshorn on the Lake of Constance, and finished on June 30 in Geneva. 72 vehicles started in two classes; over 50 finished. The vehicles were powered exclusively by direct onboard solar power in addition to an initial charge of the onboard accumulators. The second class also allowed direct human power with pedals. The rally was conceived as a kind of race with the winners being those using the least time to travel the set course each day. The course was on unclosed public roads and the drivers were required to adhere all traffic rules and speed limits. The first events were very popular with thousands of spectators lining the roads and visiting the camps where the vehicles stopped each day. In later years the fastest vehicles also raced on round-circuit closed-off courses each day after arriving at the stops. From 1990 the organisers also held separate events called Tour de Sol Alpine. These included closed courses on frozen lakes and snowy roads and on unclosed mountain passes.

After a few years other organisers carried out similar rallies, e.g. the American Tour de Sol. In 1988 the Tour de Sol also held the first race for solar powered boats on July 1 at Estavayer-le-Lac.

The Tour de Sol initially stipulated direct solar power from onboard solar cells. After the first couple of events, a class was introduced which allowed charging accumulators from stationary solar panels and swapping accumulators. Later another class also allowed charging from the 230 VAC mains, provided that this amount of electricity was generated elsewhere by solar power and fed into the mains. This led to the development of the first domestic grid-feed systems.

The legal form of the Tour de Sol was a foundation. It ceased in 2002. Solar engineer Josef Jenni is credited as the inventor of the event and Urs Muntwyler developed and led it for most of its years.

== Courses ==
The course of the first Tour de Sol was relatively flat and direct, in later years the courses were circuitous and included mountain passes.

- 1985: Romanshorn - Geneva
- 1986: Freiburg (Germany) - Suhr
- 1987: Biel - Arosa
- 1988: Zürich - Etoy
- 1989: Rheinfelden - Locarno
- 1990: Schaffhausen - Münsingen
- 1990: Tour de Sol Alpine (on snow): Lenzerheide-Valbella (dito in 1991)
- 1991: Suhr - Beatenberg (total altitude gain 5000 m)
- 1991: Tour de Sol Alpine (on roads): Laax - St. Moritz
- 1992: Pforzheim (Germany) - Saas Fee
- 1993: Luzern - Adelboden

== Regulations ==
The detailed regulations for the vehicles were described in a 24-page handbook. The main specifications for the vehicles were for the size of the solar cells and the accumulator battery. The racing category allowed a panel up to 6 m^{2} or 480 Watts peak and a battery capacity of up to 4.8 kWh. These vehicles were checked by the police and got temporary licences for the duration of the event. For vehicles with a regular road licence other specifications applied.

== Two-wheelers ==
The vehicles mostly had three or four wheels but from the beginning a few bicycles with solar trailers participated. This later led to the development of Swiss production electric bicycles and motorcycles, notably the first production pedelec, the Velocity, and soon after the Flyer, which was heavily promoted and increased the popularity of pedelecs in Switzerland by a great deal.

== See also ==
- Solar car racing
- Solar vehicle
