= Avcon =

American company

Avcon Corporation
- Industry: Automobile
- Founded: 1995
- Defunct: 2007
- Headquarters: Franklin, Wisconsin
- Products: Charging interfaces for battery electric vehicles
- Parent: Maréchal Electric
- Website: avconev.com

Avcon Corporation was a company that manufactured charging interfaces for early battery electric vehicles (BEV). The lettering convention is Avcon for the company and AVCON (capitals) for the EV charging connector. The company ceased operation in 2007. The AVCON coupler was retired the following year.

== History ==
Avcon belonged to the Maréchal Electric group of companies, which has its primary corporate headquarters in France. Maréchal established the MELTRIC Corporation in 1981 to market products for North America; MELTRIC, in turn, registered the trademark for Avcon Corporation in 1995. The initial registered address for Avcon was in Cudahy, Wisconsin. The company ceased operation in 2007. On April 10, 2020, the United States Patent and Trademark Office [USPTO] invalidated the company’s trademark.

== AVCON coupler system ==
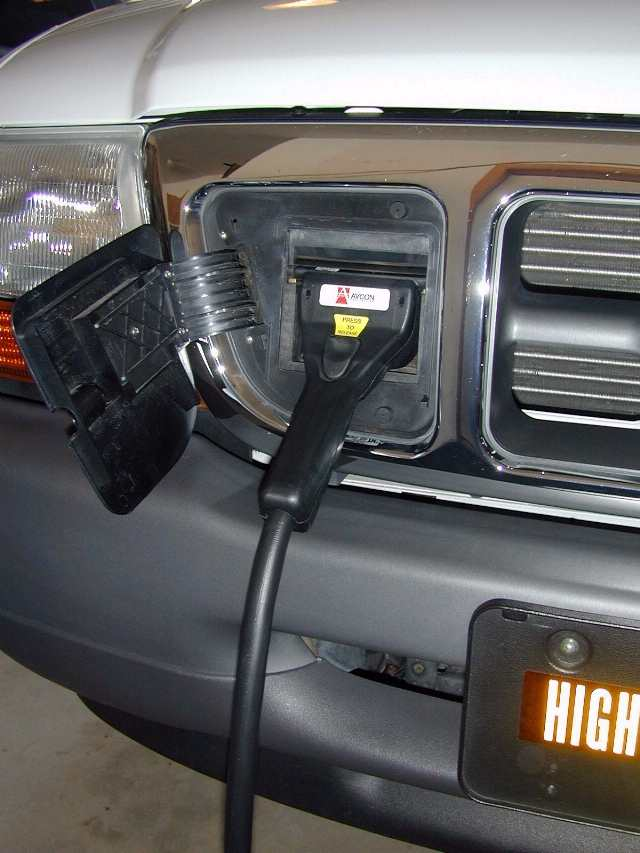
AVCON connector mated with inlet in the grille of a Ford Ranger EV

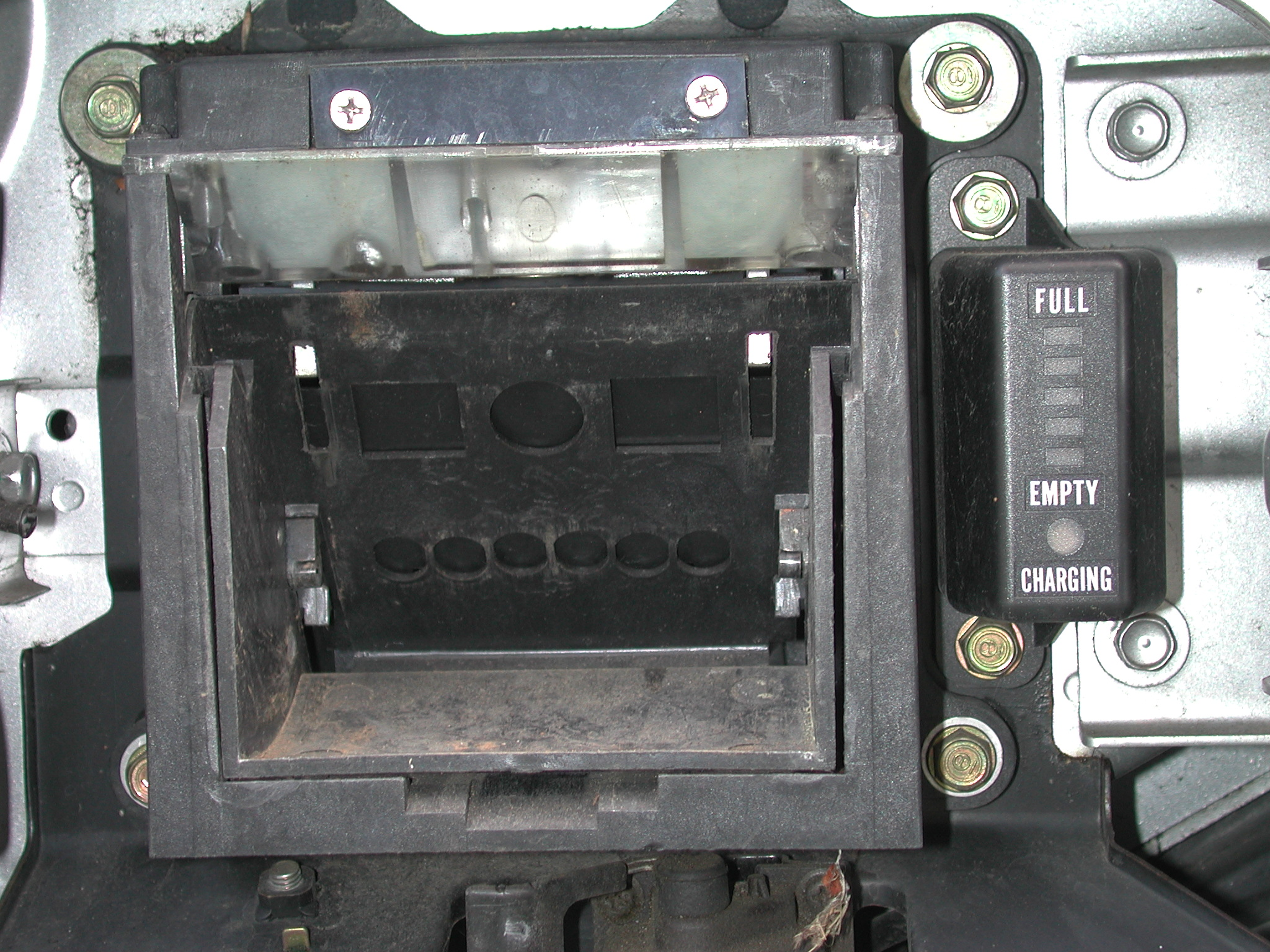
AVCON vehicle inlet on a Honda EV Plus

The AVCON conductive interface was used by the Ford Ranger EV truck, Solectria, and the Honda EV Plus. The AVCON conductive EV charging coupler system consists of a rectangular charging connector (the male handle at the end of the electric vehicle supply equipment cable) which plugs into a vehicle inlet (the female receptacle) mounted on the vehicle.

The SAE J1772 "SAE Electric Vehicle Conductive Charge Coupler" recommended practice for surface vehicles was first issued in 1996, with the AVCON connector described in an appendix. Maréchal designed the initial coupler with butt connectors, which included 11 contacts overall, two of which were DC contacts for Level 3 charging (as defined in article 625 of the 1999 version of the National Electrical Code). The November 2001 version of SAE J1772 moved the AVCON connector into the main body, making it the default connector in North America; the revised version of the AVCON connector has six contacts, dropping support for Level 3 charging.

The AVCON coupler was succeeded in the 2009 edition of SAE J1772 by a round keyed coupler designed by Yazaki. American and Japanese plug-in electric vehicles that came to market starting in 2011 such as the Chevrolet Volt and Nissan Leaf use the Yazaki coupler specified in the 2009 revision of SAE J1772 for level 2 charging. The J1772(2009) coupler is also listed as the Type 1 coupler in the IEC 62196-2 AC charging standard, and the AVCON coupler is now deprecated.

=== Conductive and inductive charging systems ===
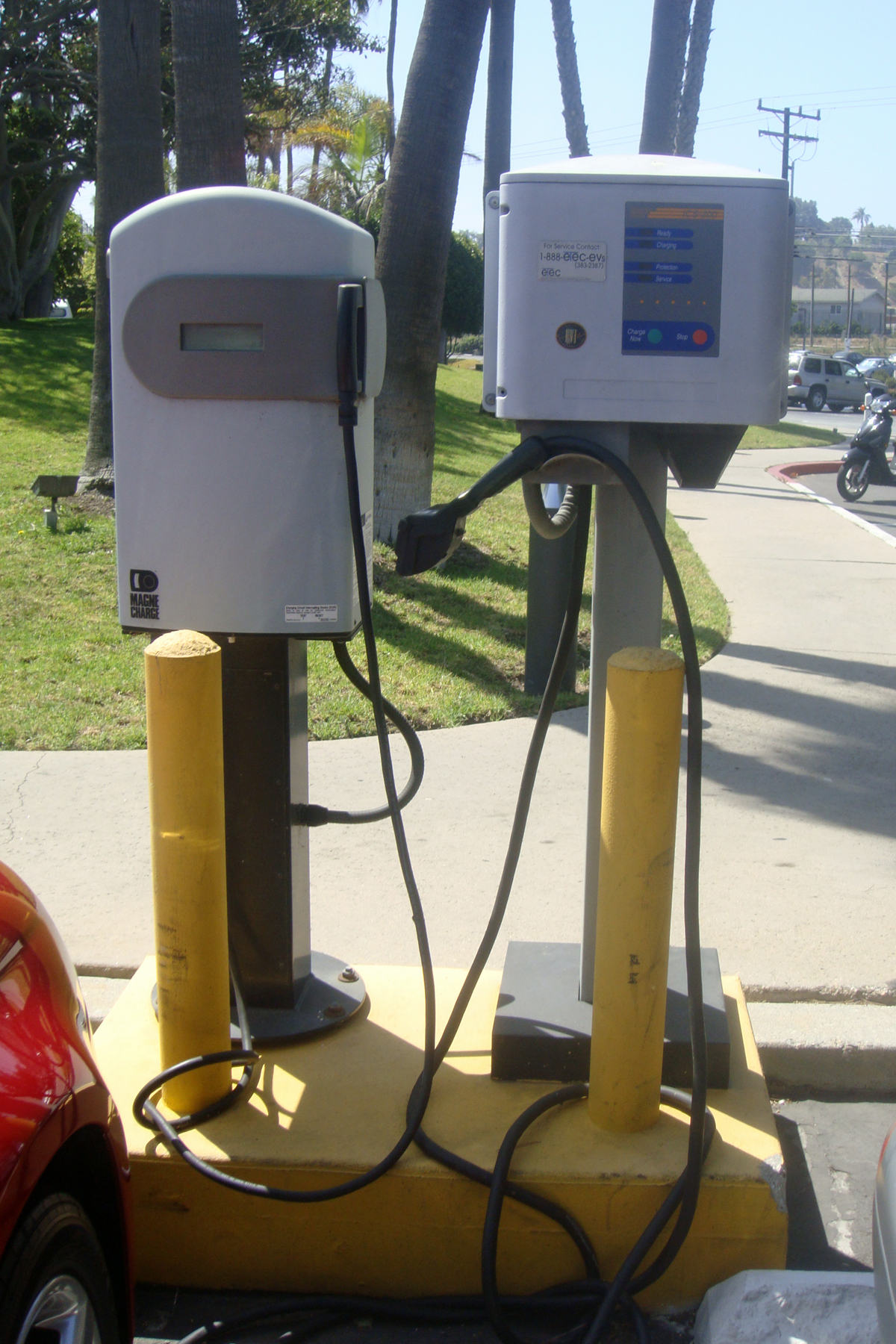
Public charging stations near LAX. The two 6 kW AC charging stations reflect the CARB mandate to include both connector types: the inductive Magne-charge gen2 SPI ("small paddle", left) and the conductive EVII ICS-200 AVCON (right).

The AVCON conductive interface was the primary competitor to the Magne Charge inductive charging paddle used by the General Motors EV1 and Chevy S10 EV, plus the 2002 Toyota RAV4 EV. Ford and Honda chose AVCON as a more cost effective EV charging solution to transfer the same 6KW AC power to the EV's on-board charging system (208 to 240 VAC, 40 amp circuit into the charging head).

Many public EV charging installations funded by the California Air Resources Board (CARB) – money came from DMV fees – were required to have both an inductive and a conductive AVCON charging head. This meant twice as much money was spent because the simple, cost-effective AVCON was not adopted by all automakers. These public EV charging installations did not use Avcon model charging heads; they used the more expensive EVII ICS-200 model AVCON charging heads.

Automakers abandoned their promise to CARB to produce production EVs for public purchase by using a CARB mandate loophole (selling slow neighborhood EVs or carts to obtain their CARB credits) and very few production EVs were actually sold to the public (either inductive or conductive).

=== Success of the conductive system ===
An experiment co-sponsored by the Electric Power Research Institute (EPRI) and conducted by Underwriters Laboratories during the development of SAE J1772 concluded that butt-type contacts outperformed other conductive contact types, including pin-and-sleeve contacts, for the environmental endurance testing phase.

In 2001, AVCON was endorsed by the California Air Resources Board (CARB) over Magne Charge, which caused GM to retire inductive paddle technology in 2002.

Since conductive EV charging AVCONs can be used by all EVs by using an AVCON adapter box that provides a 240 V NEMA 14–50 outlet, and inductive EV charging cannot, some RAV4 EV drivers have taken to bringing their SPI TAL inductive charger with them. This allows RAV4 EVs with an inductive charging system to recharge from public, conductive, AVCON EV charging heads. This practice will fade away since virtually all 2011 and later production Electric Vehicles are equipped with a SAE J1772 charge port. Drivers of the few 2011 and later or conversion vehicles are either using SAE J1772 adapters that connect to their chargers or are putting SAE J1772 charge ports in their vehicles.

=== Current status ===
With no current production EVs available using the AVCON standard, hosts of EV charging stations (such as Costco, shopping malls, etc.) providing electricity at no or little charge to the consumer withdrew their support to repair their public AVCON EV charging stations. Members of the Electric Auto Association, a 501.3c nonprofit, have set up funds soliciting public donations for EV charging so the charging stations can be repaired after vandals damage them. This keeps the EVs on the road by extending their range for very little electricity cost to the host.

AVCON stations are being converted to the round (Yazaki) SAE J1772 (2009) connector or phased out starting in 2011. In general, the conversion process is largely mechanical, consisting of replacing the AVCON connector with a Yazaki connector, as the signaling protocols are similar.

== See also ==
- Charging station
- SAE J1772
