= Magne Charge =

Inductive charging system

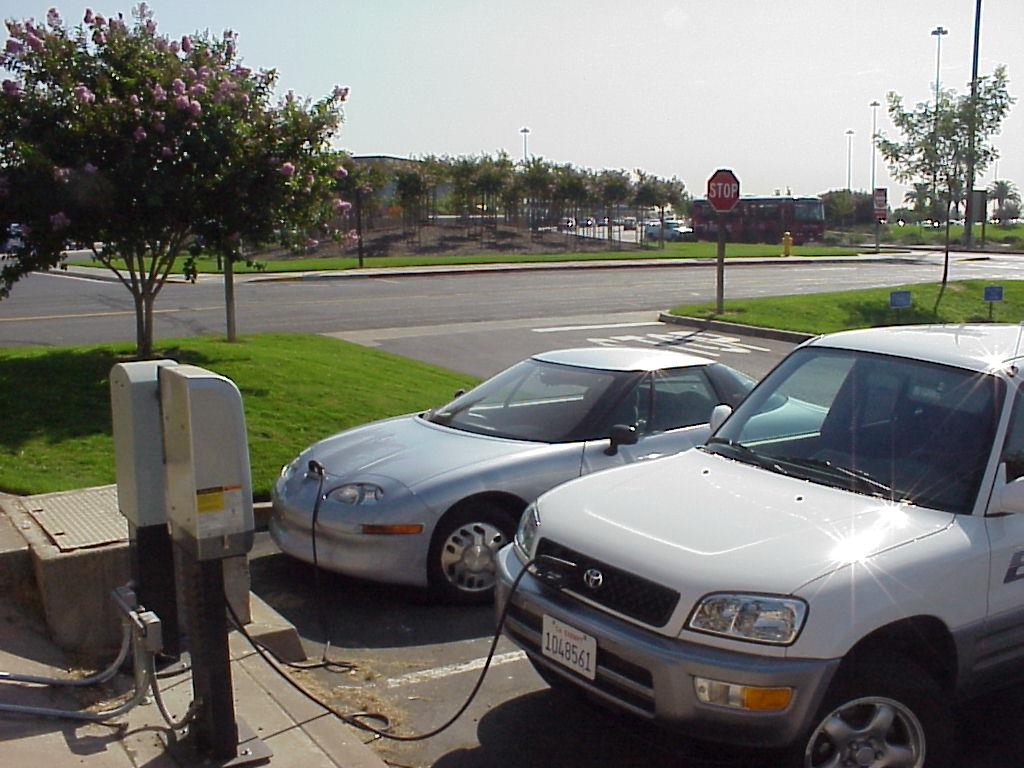
Magne Charge stations in California with a silver General Motors EV1 and white Toyota RAV4 EV

Magne Charge (also known as Magne-Charge, MagneCharge and J1773) is an obsolete inductive charging system used to charge battery electric vehicles (BEVs).

== History ==
The Magne Charge inductive charger was developed by General Motors subsidiary Delco Electronics, based on SAE recommended practice J1773 for electric passenger vehicles, primarily GM products such as the EV1 and the Chevrolet S-10 EV, however, the Nissan Altra and the first generation Toyota RAV4 EV also used the charger. J1773 was issued in 1995, revised in 1999, reaffirmed in 2009, and stabilized in 2014, indicating the recommended practice was frozen at the 1999 revision.

Magne Charge support was withdrawn by General Motors in 2002, after the California Air Resources Board selected the competing AVCON conductive charging interface for electric vehicles in California in June 2001. Magne Charge has become obsolete as the last vehicles using it (S10 EV) were produced in 2003. In addition, all EV1s and nearly all S10 EVs were lease-only; after the lease period expired, General Motors recalled and destroyed nearly all of these early BEVs.

The AVCON interface was integrated into the corresponding conductive SAE J1772 charging standard in 2001. AVCON itself was superseded in 2009 as the preferred interface in J1772 by the round Type 1 (Yazaki) connector, found on later BEVs such as the 2012 Gen 2 RAV4 EV, Nissan Leaf and Chevrolet Volt.

== Technical details ==
The charge coupler or paddle and vehicle inlet are inductively coupled to form two halves of an electrical transformer; in this case, the paddle is the primary winding and the inlet is the secondary winding. Power at utility line frequency (60 Hz) is transformed to high frequency alternating current (130 to 360 kHz) to minimize the size of the vehicle inlet portion of the transformer. The vehicle has on-board electronics to rectify the applied AC power to DC for battery charging. An infrared link is provided between the vehicle and paddle to communicate how much power is being drawn, according to feedback from the vehicle's on-board charge controller.

The Level 2 charger which supplied 6.6 kW was the most common version. A higher-power (Level 3) "fast charge" version which supplied 50 kW was demonstrated in 1998.

There were two inductive charge paddle sizes, an original large paddle and later small paddle, which were 5 1/2 and 4 1/4 in (140 and 110 mm) wide, respectively. These were often referenced on EV charging-station maps as SPI and LPI stations for Small Paddle Inductive and Large Paddle Inductive stations. The inductive coupling system was designed to be safe when used in the rain, and was demonstrated in operation fully submerged in water.

In 2011 the California Energy Commission created the Reconnect California Program, a grant program to upgrade and expand existing publicly available EV charging infrastructure to the latest version of the SAE J1772 charging standard. ClipperCreek managed the program and installed 799 charging ports at 313 legacy sites by 2020.
