= Honda EV Plus =

Late 1990s experimental U.S. electric car

Honda EV Plus (ZA1)
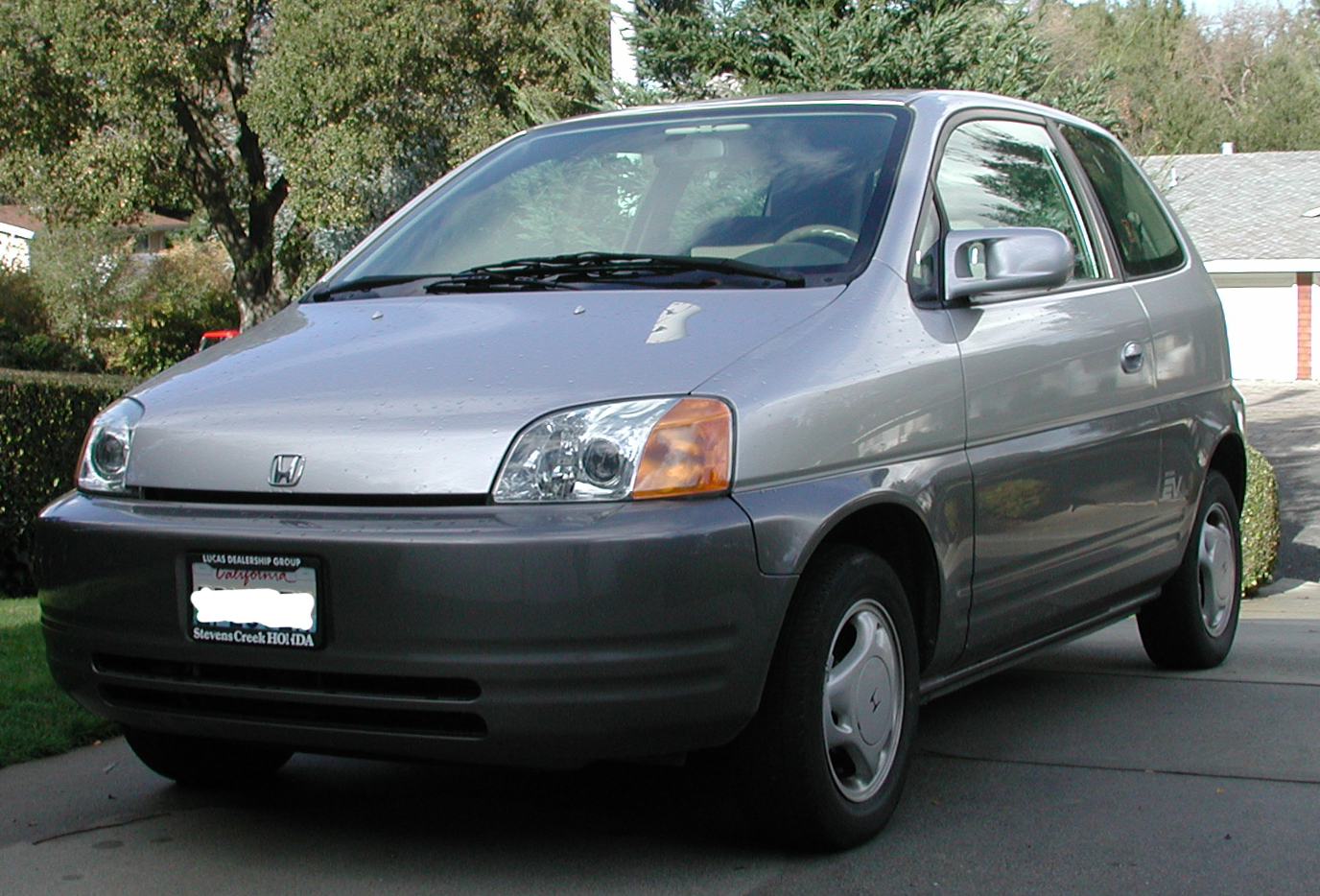

Overview
- Manufacturer: Honda
- Production: 1997–1999 about 300 produced
- Assembly: Japan: Mooka, Tochigi

Body and chassis
- Class: Subcompact car
- Body style: 3-door hatchback
- Related: Honda Logo

Powertrain
- Electric motor: 49 kW (66 hp), 275 N⋅m (200 ft⋅lb) Brushless DC Motor
- Battery: 28.7 kWh, 288 V (12 V×24) NiMH
- Range: 80–105 mi (129–169 km)
- Plug-in charging: SAE J1772-1998 (Avcon) connector

Dimensions
- Wheelbase: 99.6 in (2,530 mm)
- Length: 159.3 in (4,050 mm)
- Width: 68.9 in (1,750 mm)
- Height: 64.2 in (1,630 mm)
- Curb weight: 3,590 lb (1,630 kg)

Chronology
- Successor: Honda Insight

The Honda EV Plus was an experimental electric vehicle which was the first battery electric vehicle from a major automaker that did not use lead–acid batteries. Roughly 340 EV Plus models were produced and released. Production of the EV Plus was discontinued in 1999 after Honda announced the release of its first hybrid electric vehicle, the Honda Insight.

The EV Plus served to test advanced battery chemistry in an electric car and also met California Air Resources Board requirements for zero-emission vehicles, like the General Motors EV1. It also tested the pancake-style motor, electronic control unit, power control unit and the nickel–metal hydride battery (NiMH) later used in Honda hybrids and developed further in the first Honda FCX Fuel Cell Vehicles, which were rebuilt from returned (decommissioned) EV Plus chassis.

== Development ==
Honda began development of an electric vehicle (EV) in April 1988, inspired in part by the General Motors Sunraycer, which won the World Solar Challenge in 1987, and with an intent to meet increasingly stringent future emissions standards. The first electric vehicle team at Honda had just four people. At the time, Honda was the last automotive company in Japan to start work on electric vehicles.

Early obstacles were discovered; electric traction motors that were powerful or efficient were too large to fit, energy storage density using existing lead–acid technology was similarly too low, and the time required to recharge was inconvenient. Besides the technical challenges, California issued a Zero Emission Vehicle (ZEV) mandate in late 1990, requiring manufacturers to sell 2% of their total sales as ZEVs, starting in 1998. With that in mind, Honda devoted approximately 100 employees to begin full-scale EV development early in 1991.

A first prototype was designed, based on the existing three-door hatchback Civic, retrofitted with commercially available electric motor and lead–acid batteries, and modified with numerous weight-saving measures, including aluminum body panels and acrylic plastic windows; it was completed in July 1991 and ran without issues. Although EV project team members were relieved that it was operable, project leader Junichi Araki was furious: "You call this a car? What the heck did you just make? Why don't you just dig a hole, and bury it!" Over the next two hours, Araki explained his anger: the finished product was a shameful compromise and merely an excuse for Honda's inexperience with EVs. "As long as we continue trying a variety of measures in a project, each car we produce must constitute a learning experience that leads to the next step. If a car doesn't lead to greater experience, we might as well not build it. I was so disappointed that they hadn't put more passion into the project." The team refocused their goal "to make a good electric vehicle, with no compromises."

As an example, the Honda EV project's powerplant team began working with battery manufacturers, proposing a battery format and size that were later adopted as a global standard. In addition, they began developing their own DC brushless motor, since commercially available motors were not efficient enough. By June 1992, Honda had begun development of a purpose-built prototype, which led to the EV-X, a working concept vehicle exhibited at Tokyo in 1993, then powertrain testing with the Clean Urban Vehicle-4 (CUV-4), a converted Civic hatchback, gathering test data starting in August 1994. Over the next two years, the fleet of ten CUV-4s would be driven for an aggregate 80,000 miles (130,000 km) in partnership with California utilities Pacific Gas & Electric (operating five) and Southern California Edison (three).

These tests convinced Honda that lead–acid batteries were unsuitable as the main storage for a production-level electric vehicle. The CUV-4 had a limited range of just 25 to 31 miles (40 to 50 km), prompting tweaks to the basic vehicle specifications that were later realized in the EV Plus, including battery voltage, chemistry, and motor power. A prototype EV Plus was assembled in December 1995, and production was approved in January 1996; the first production EV Plus left the line at Takanezawa in April 1997.

== Features ==
The EV Plus featured on-board conductive charging with the Avcon connector, passive battery balancing, regenerative braking and deceleration, AC/heat pump climate control, HID headlights, 4 seats, and electrically heated windshield. The car was equipped with an oil-fired heater for faster cabin heating and passenger comfort, but the heater was not operable until the ambient temperature was below 40 °F (4 °C) to comply with California ZEV standards. The heater had an output of 7 kW (24,000 BTU/h).

The EV Plus came with a 12 V battery to power standard automotive accessories and lighting.

Vehicles also featured:

- CD player
- Power windows
- Power door locks
- Remote key fob controlled Air conditioning
- Electrically heated windshield

== Performance ==
- Track Front/Rear: 59.1 in/58.7 in (150 cm/149 cm)
- Drive Train: Front-wheel drive
- Occupants: Four
- Transmission: Single speed with reverse
- Charger: On-board conductive
- Recharge: 8 hours with 240 V charger, 35 hours with 120 V emergency charger.
- Acceleration: 4.9 s (0–30 mph)
- Maximum Speed: 80+ mph (130 km/h)
- Colors: dark green, bronze, silver

The traction motor output rating was 49 kW (66 hp) at 8,750 RPM and 203 lb⋅ft (275 N⋅m).

Battery capacity was 28.7 kWh; the battery weighed 486.1 kg (1,072 lb) and occupied a volume of 292 L (10.3 cu ft). Using a 120 V "emergency" charger, approximately 24 hours were required for a complete charge; in contrast, the 240 V charger was able to restore 80% of charge in 2 hours. Under instrumented testing, the EV Plus required approximately 7 hours to fully charge its battery at a rate of just over 5 kW.

At introduction, Honda cautioned potential drivers that actual driving range was limited to 60 to 80 mi (97 to 129 km). Southern California Edison tested a Honda EV Plus at Pomona, California and determined the range was between 78.8 mi (126.8 km) (freeway loop, with auxiliary loads) to 105.3 mi (169.5 km) (urban loop, without auxiliary loads). As with virtually all vehicles, range was affected by driving style: rapid acceleration, high speeds, and fast stops lowered the all-electric range significantly. United States Environmental Protection Agency rated the range at 81 miles (130 km), and careful driving would give it a range of just over 100 miles (160 km). Consumption is rated at 710 watt-hours per mile (1,600 kJ/km); using an electricity equivalent of 33.7 kWh per gallon of gasoline, that gives an equivalent efficiency of 48 mpg_{‑US} (4.9 L/100 km) combined, 49 / 46 mpg_{‑US} (4.8 / 5.1 L/100 km) city/highway.

A race-prepared EV Plus set a new record for electric vehicles at the Pikes Peak International Hill Climb in 1999 by finishing in 15:19.91. The special EV Plus, prepared and driven by Teruo Sugita, had been converted to mid-engine, rear-wheel drive and fitted with extra batteries.

== Sales and production ==
The EV Plus was listed with an MSRP of $53,999, but Honda never allowed them to be sold, instead offering the cars on a 3-year, lease-only program for $455.00 per month. The cost of the battery pack alone was estimated at US$20,000 (equivalent to $40,100 in 2025), and consumers were warned the battery would need to be replaced every three years, necessitating the lease program. Lease customers were required to install a 220-volt charger. The lease cost included comprehensive and collision coverage, all maintenance, and roadside assistance.

The EV Plus was first available to California drivers starting on May 14, 1997, with four dealerships (three in Southern California and one in Sacramento) offering the new model; eight were leased within a week of release. By December, only 79 had been leased. From May 1997 to July 1998, Honda leased 177 EV Plus vehicles in southern California. In 1998 additional dealerships were authorized in northern California. 15 EV Plus vehicles were leased to the University of California, Riverside as the basis of a car-sharing program; on average, 100 trips per day were taken by faculty, staff, and students, with most trips lasting less than 4 miles (6.4 km). The final EV Plus was assembled in April 1999; in total, approximately 325 were leased to customers: 300 in the United States, 20 in Japan, and 5 in Europe.

At the time Honda announced it would discontinue production, it promised to continue to re-lease and service the EV Plus indefinitely. Honda allowed some customers to extend their EV Plus lease for a few years. At the end of the leases, all EV Plus cars were taken back by Honda, decommissioned, and the vast majority eventually destroyed, shown on camera in a PBS program and depicted in a scene from the documentary Who Killed the Electric Car?. Today, two EV Plus units remain, both owned by Honda USA. A few Honda EV Plus chassis were used as the base for some of Honda's first hydrogen (H_{2}) fuel cell vehicle prototypes.

The platform and drivetrain of the EV Plus were reused for the Honda FCX, a fuel cell vehicle. Instead of the high-voltage traction battery of the EV Plus, the FCX used hydrogen stored on board in a fuel cell reactor to generate electricity. Then those prototypes were also destroyed.

== Gallery ==
Honda EV Plus

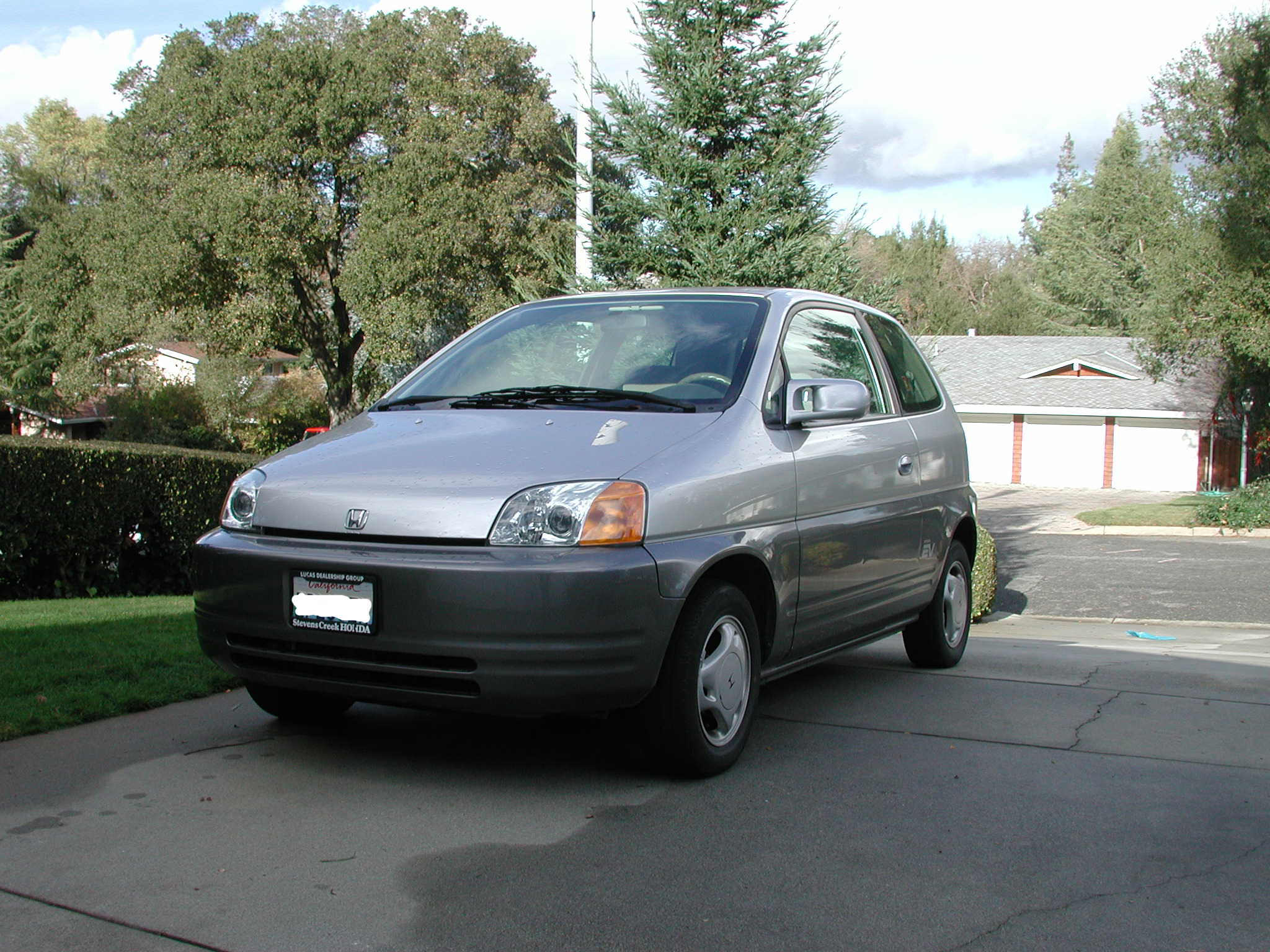
3/4 front view

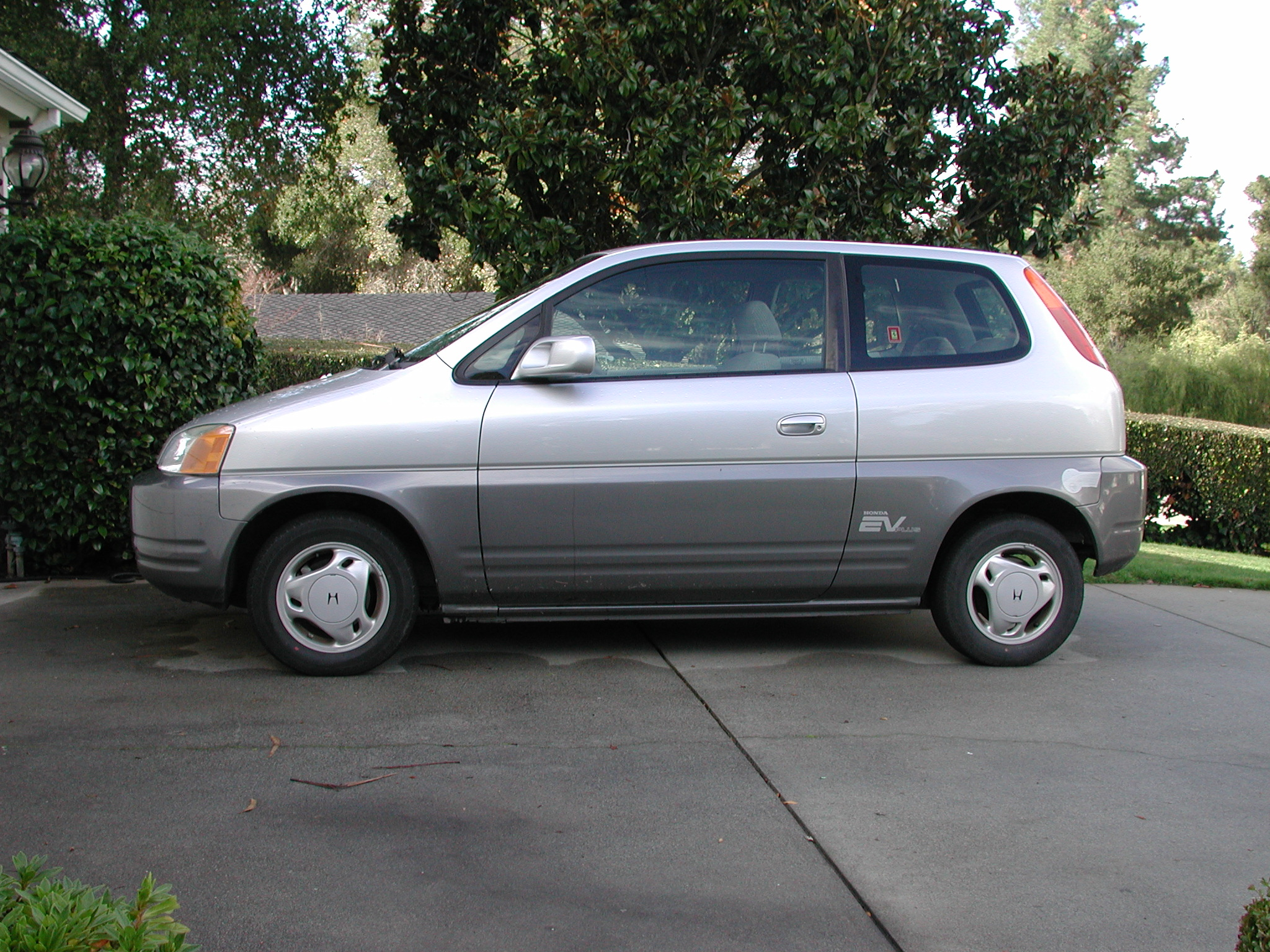
Side view

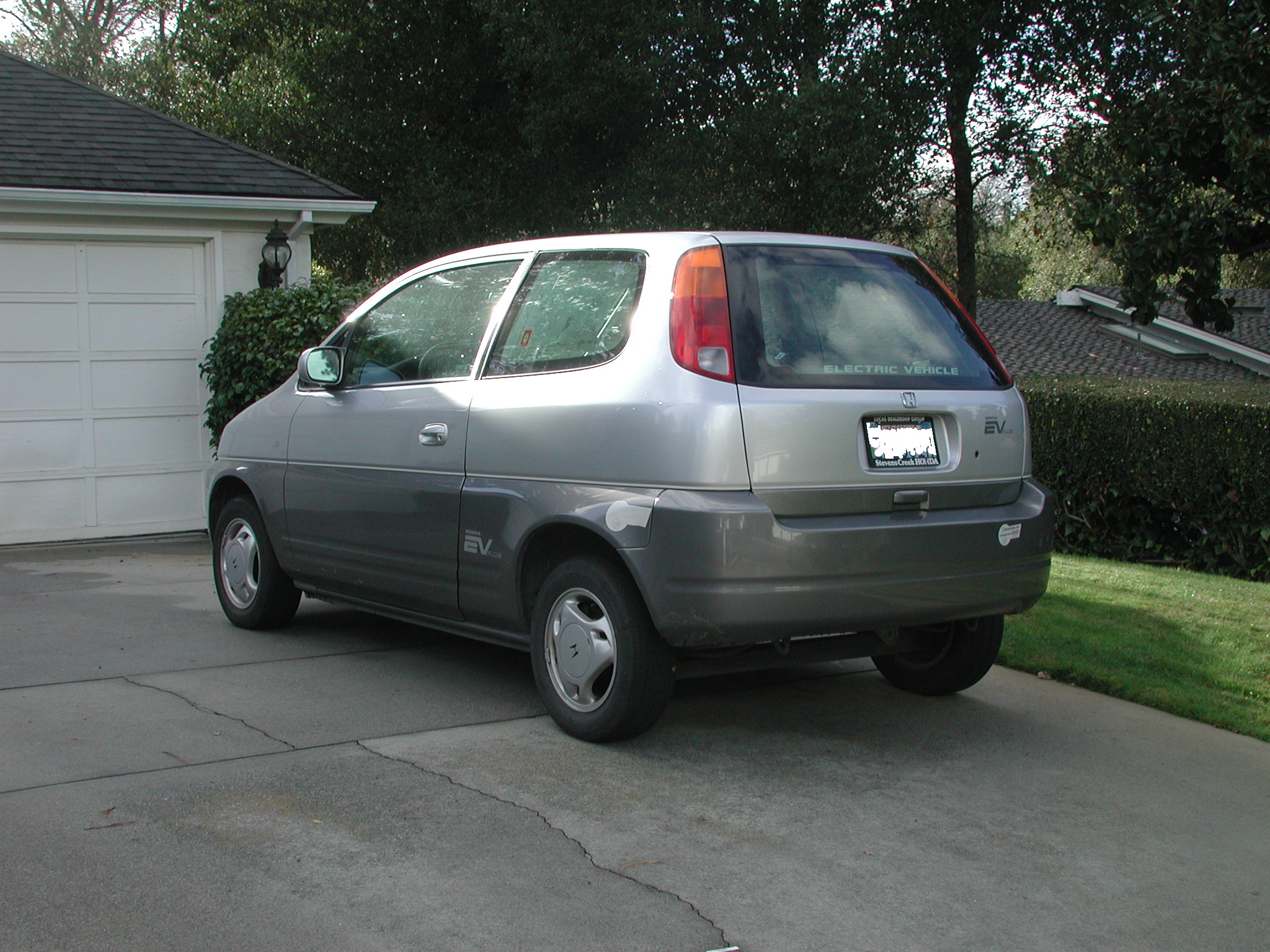
3/4 rear view

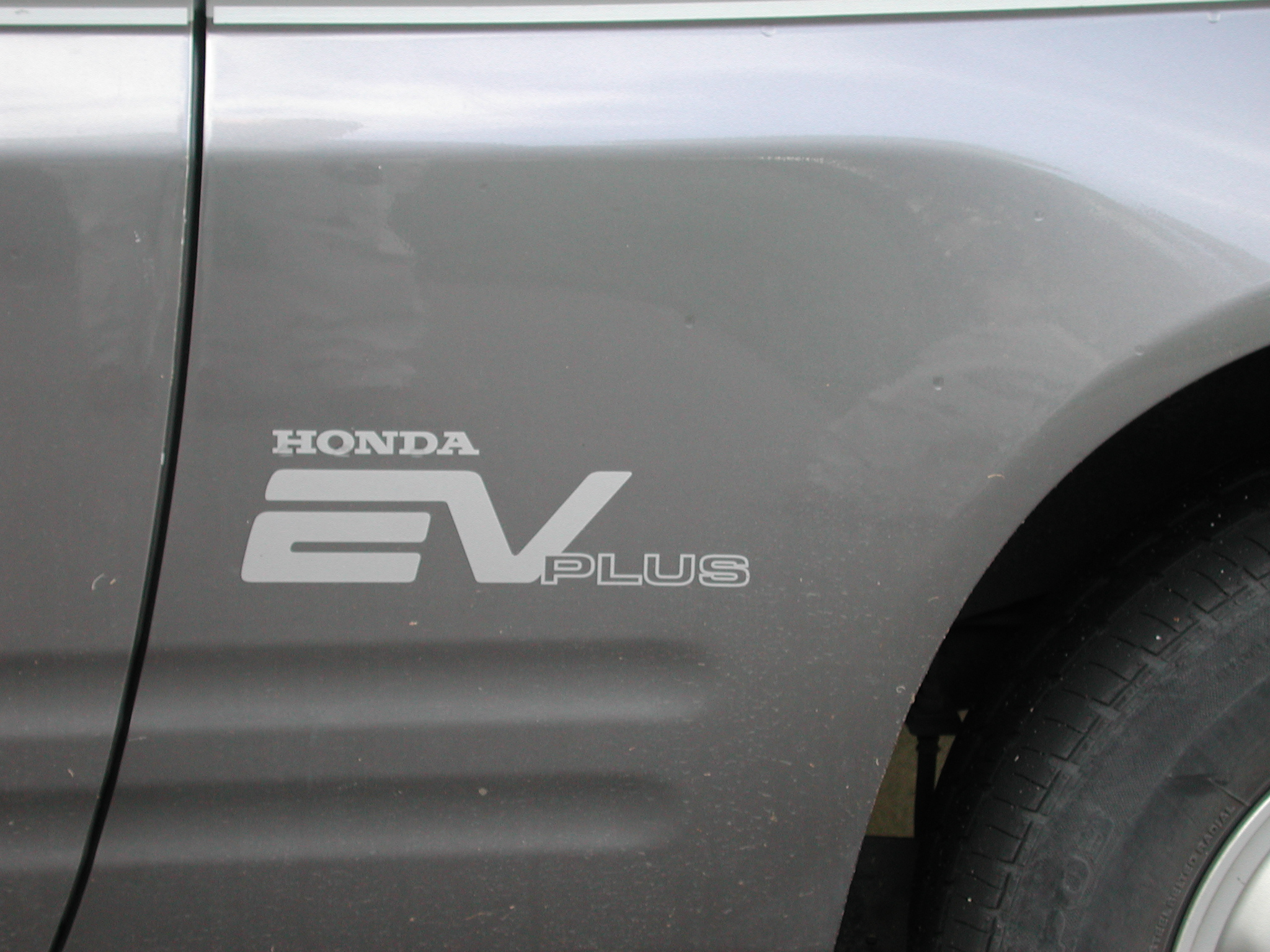
Name decal

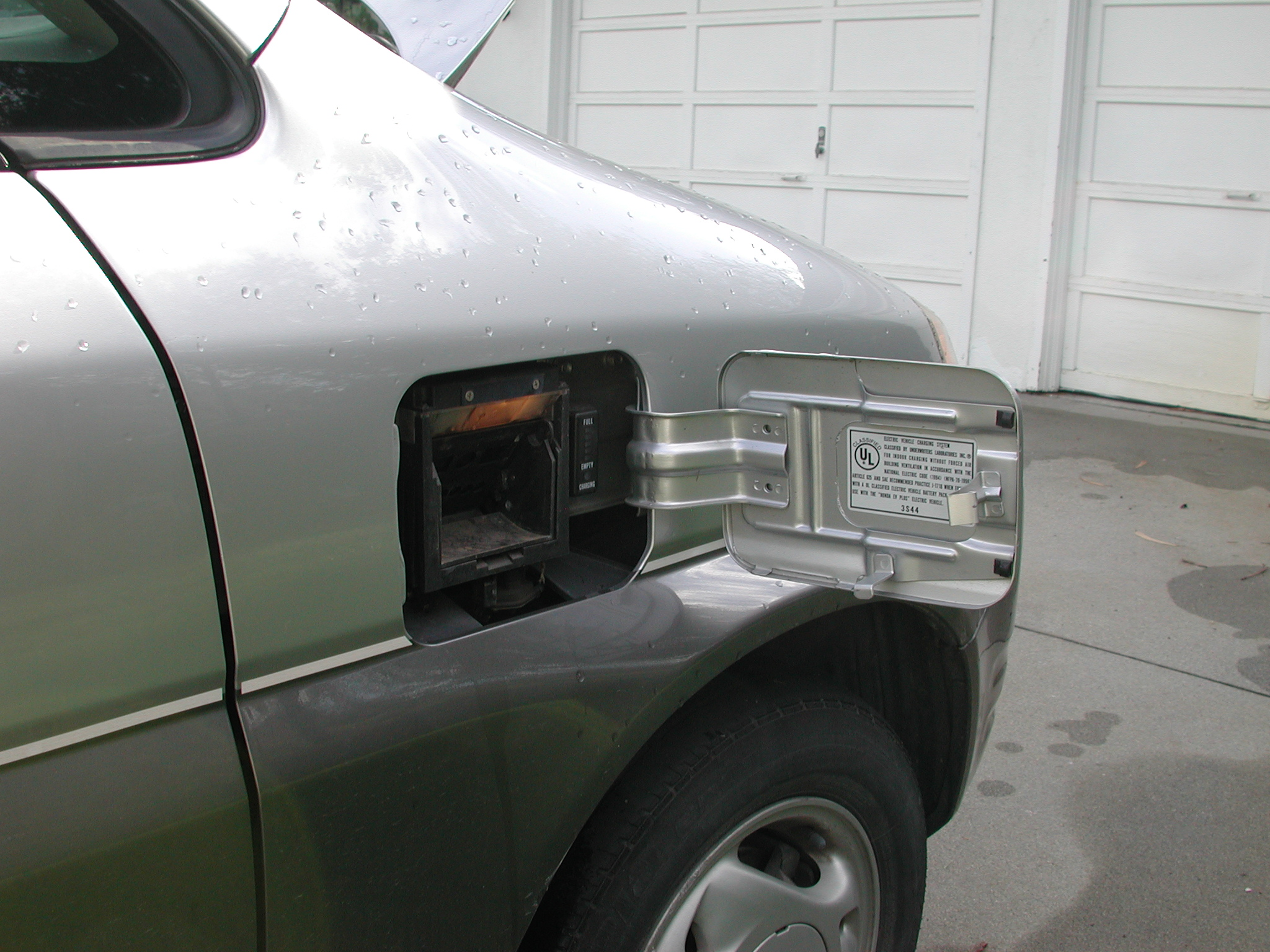
Avcon charging port & UL label

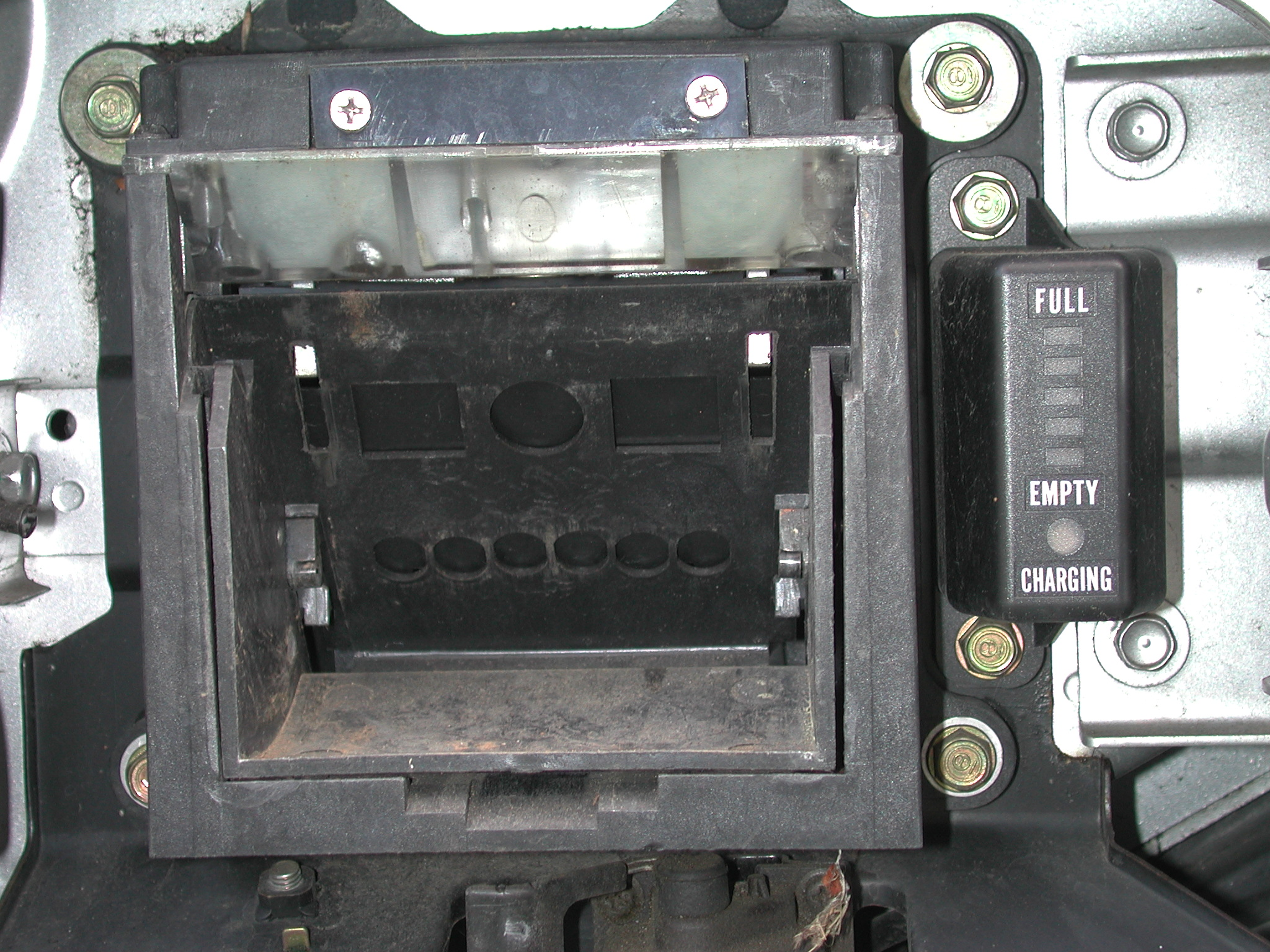
Avcon charging port close-up

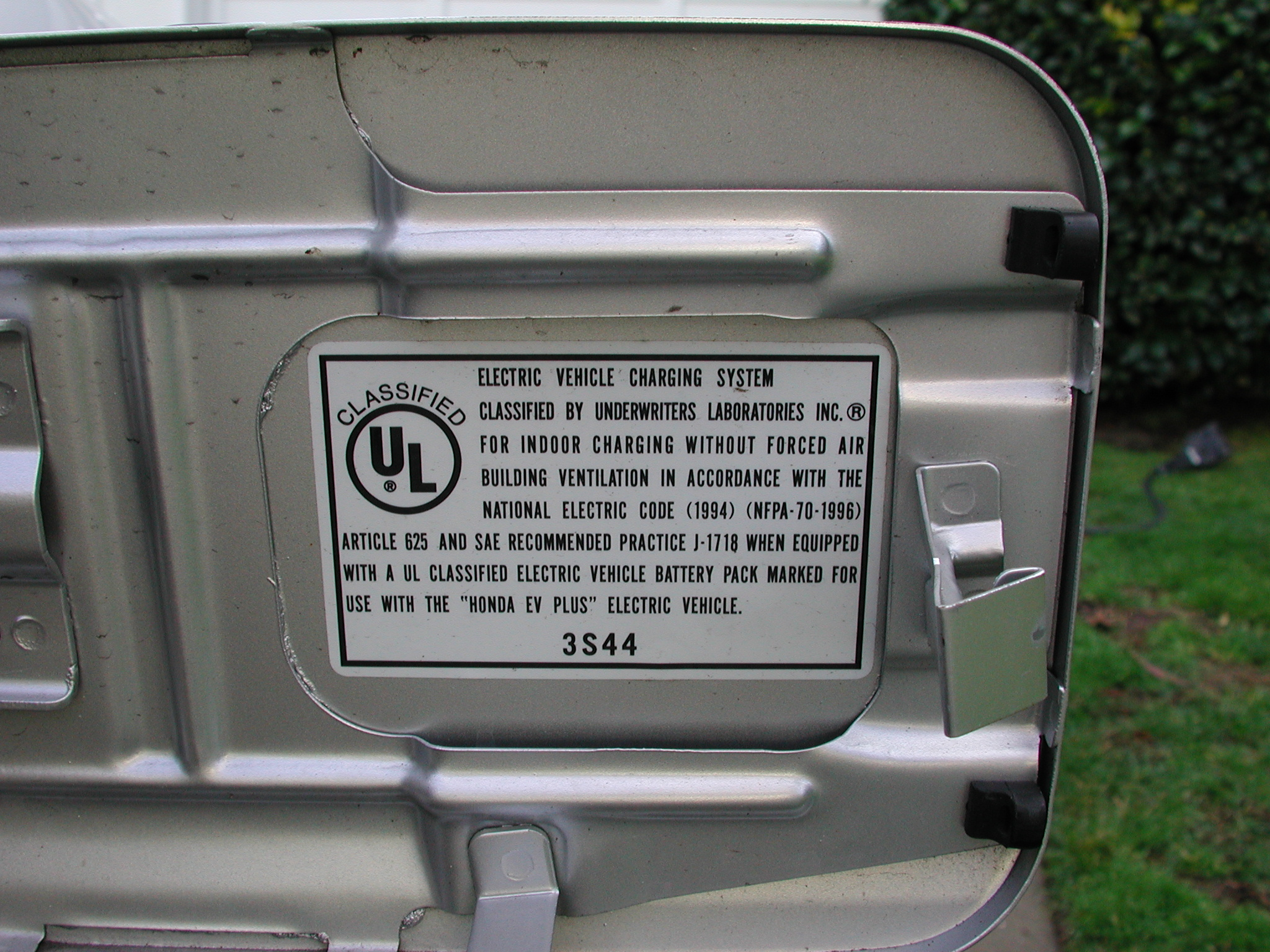
UL label

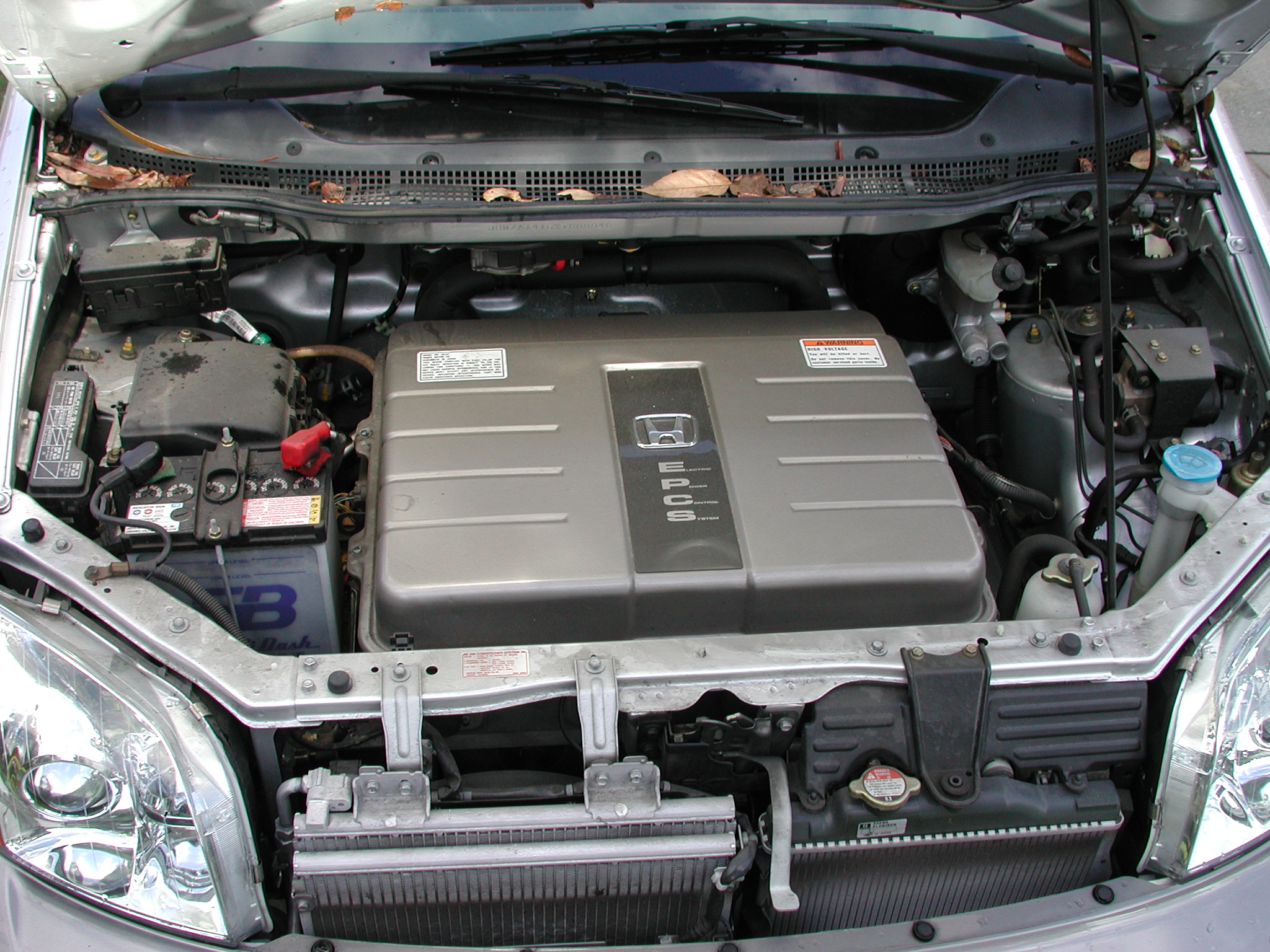
Motor compartment

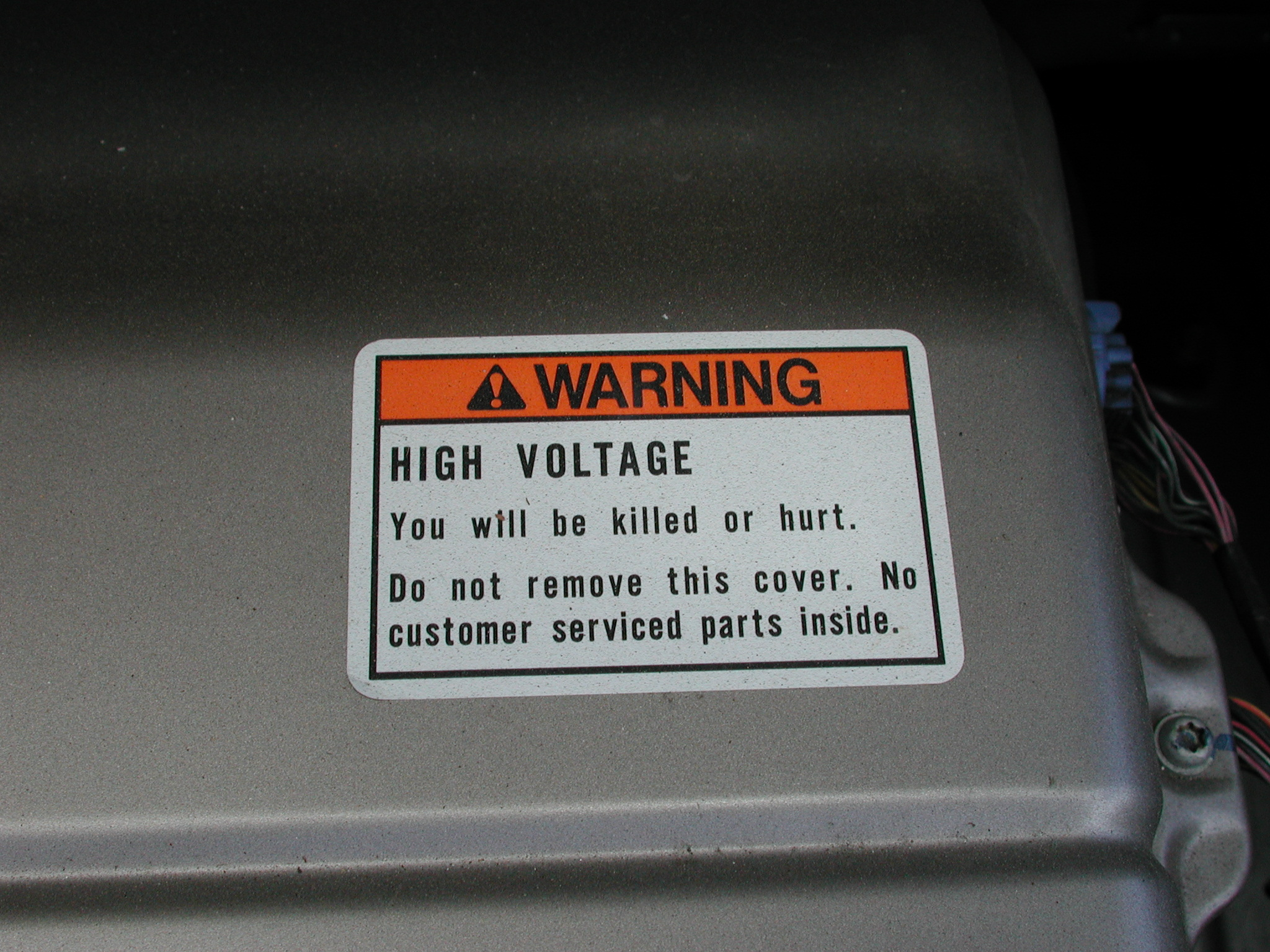
Warning label on motor controller

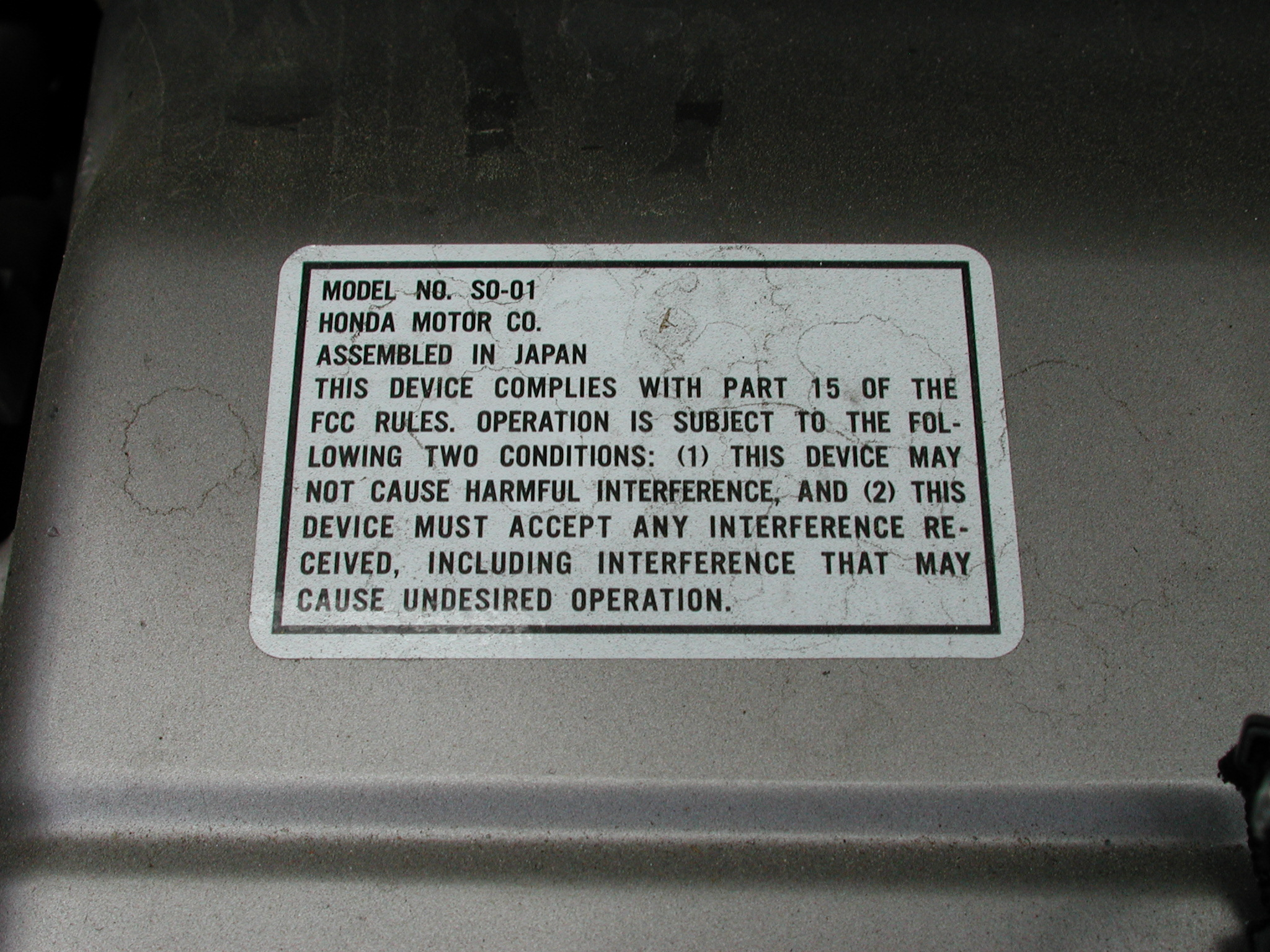
FCC label on motor controller

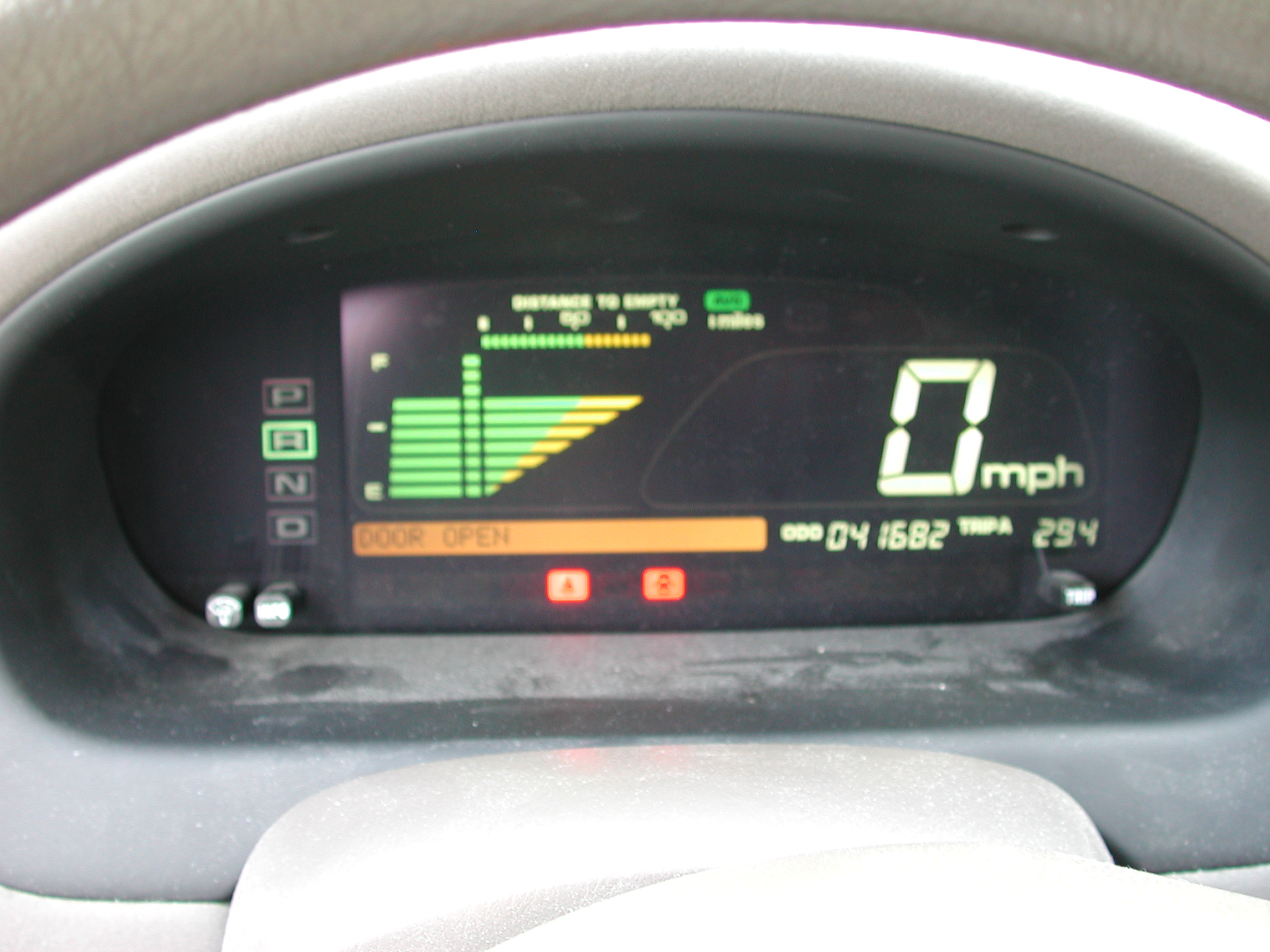
Instrument panel

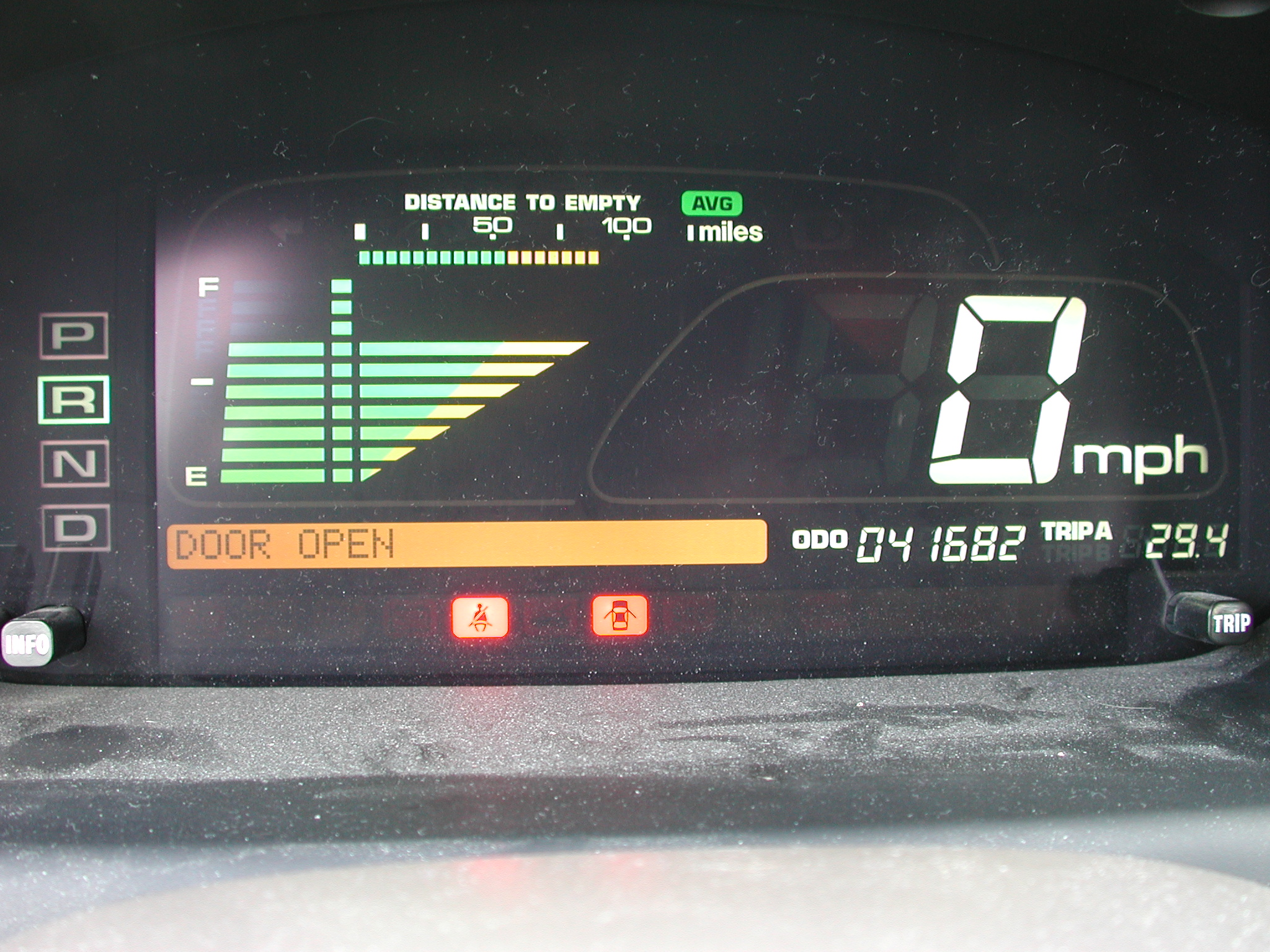
Instrument panel close-up

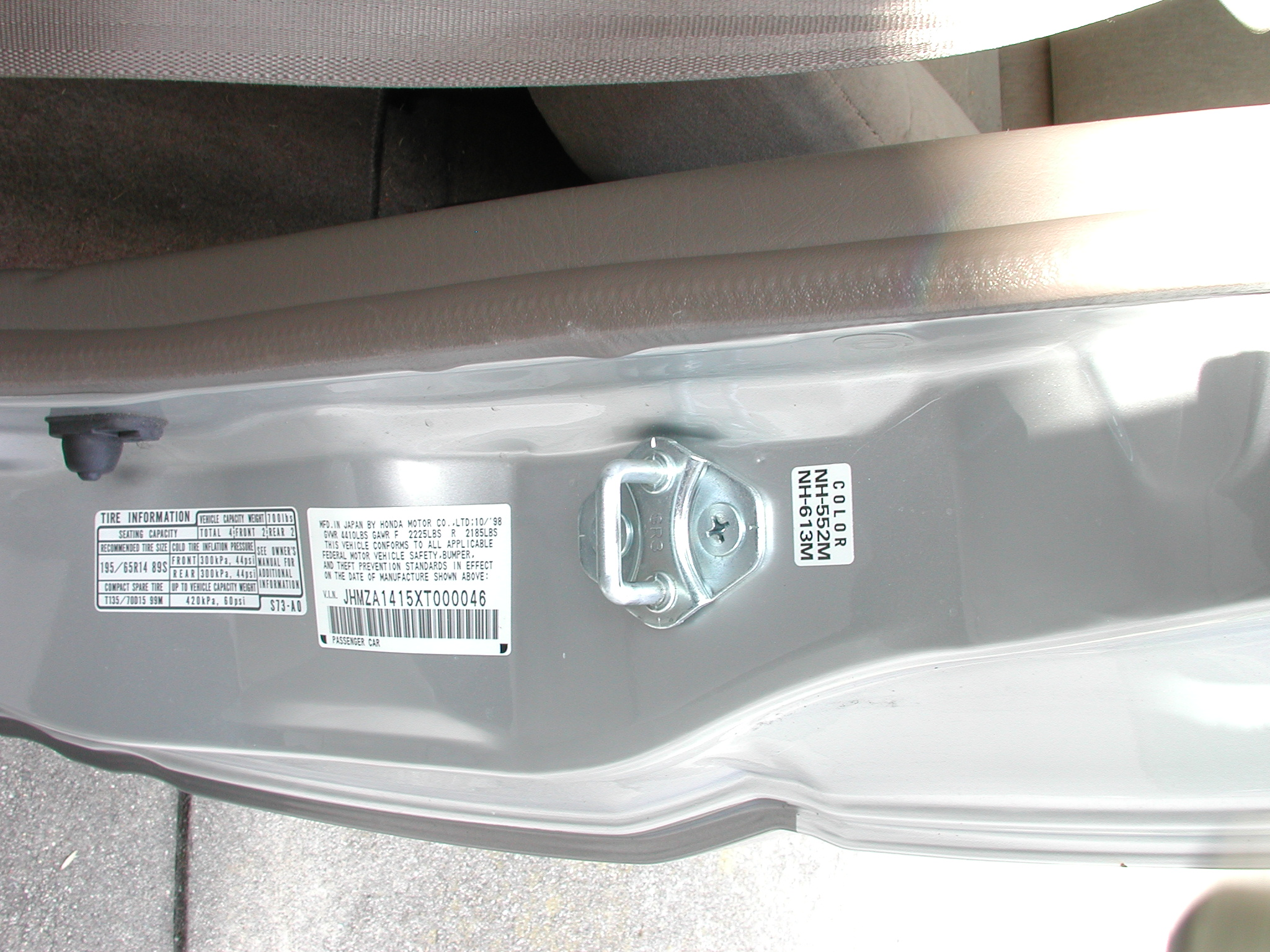
Door panel
