= Toyota RAV4 EV =

All-electric compact crossover SUV

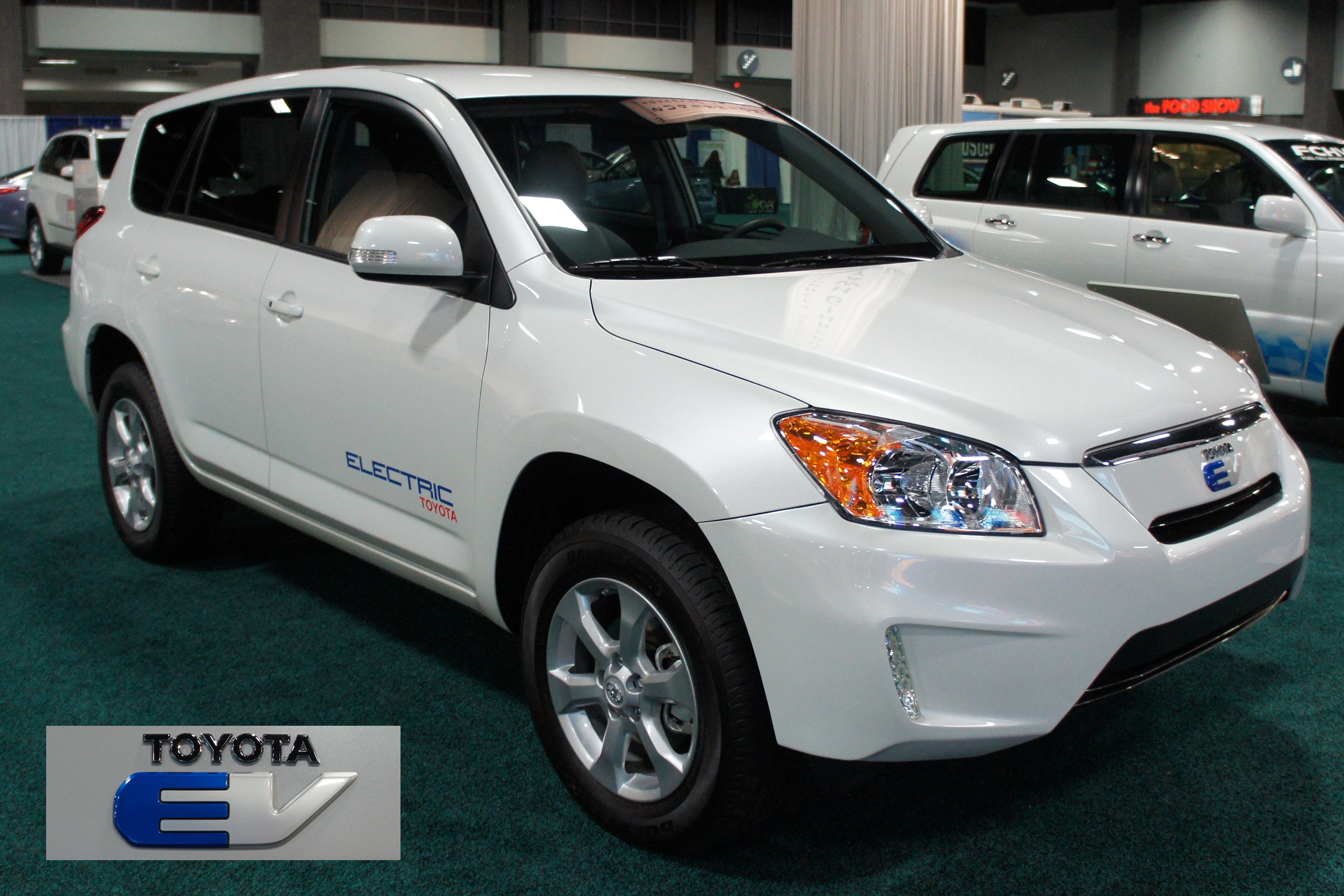
- Second generation RAV4 EV

Overview
- Manufacturer: Toyota
- Production: 1997 – 2003; 2012 – 2014

Body and chassis
- Class: Compact crossover SUV
- Body style: 5-door SUV
- Layout: Front-motor, front-wheel-drive

Chronology
- Successor: Toyota bZ4X

The Toyota RAV4 EV is an all-electric version of the popular RAV4 SUV produced by Toyota until 2014. Two generations of the EV model were sold in California, and to fleets elsewhere in the US, with a gap of almost ten years between them.

The first generation was leased from 1997 to 2003, and at the lessees' request, many units were sold after the vehicle was discontinued. A total of 1,484 were leased and/or sold in California to meet the state's mandate for zero-emissions vehicle. A small number were sold or leased in fleet sales in other states. As of mid-2012, there were almost 500 vehicles still in use in California. Production of the second generation EV was limited to 2,600 units during a three-year run, with sales limited to California beginning in 2012. Production ended in September 2014. A total of 2,489 units of the second generation model were sold in California through April 2015.

Toyota worked together with Tesla Motors and Panasonic to develop the second generation RAV4 EV, and the electric SUV was released in the United States in September 2012. The US Environmental Protection Agency rated the second generation RAV4 EV with a range of 103 mi (166 km) and a combined fuel economy rating of 76 miles per gallon gasoline equivalent (3.1 L/100 km).

== First generation (1997) ==
First generation
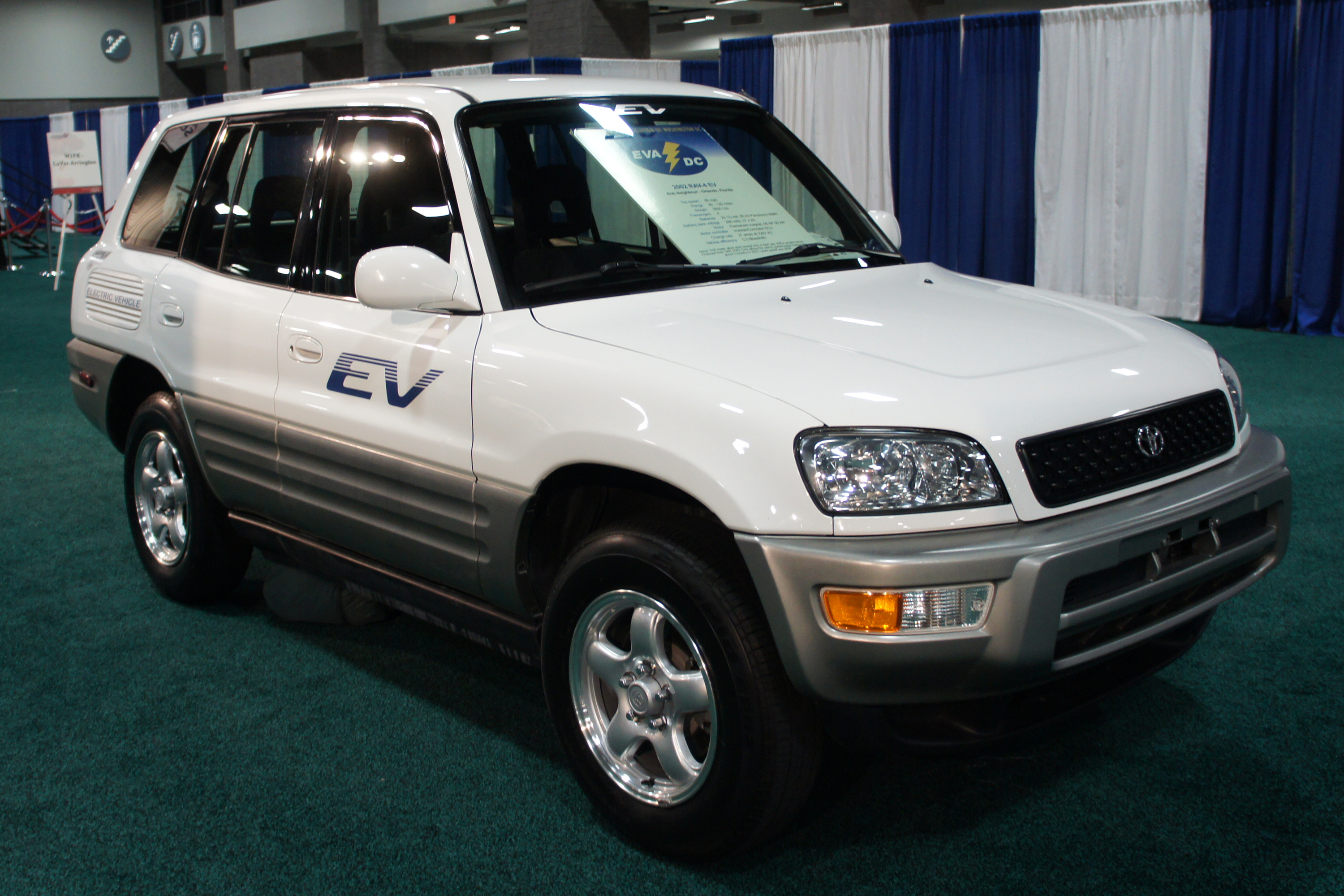
- Toyota RAV4 EV first generation (BEA11)

Overview
- Production: 1997–2003
- Assembly: Japan: Toyota, Aichi (Motomachi plant); Tahara, Aichi (Tahara plant)

Powertrain
- Electric motor: 50 kW (67 hp), 190 N⋅m (140 ft⋅lb) AC synchronous permanent-magnet motor
- Transmission: Single-speed transaxle, 9.455:1 ratio
- Battery: Panasonic 27.4 kWh NiMH
- Range: 95 mi (153 km) (EPA)
- Plug-in charging: 6 kW 100–240 V onboard charger for 1Φ 30 A using Magne Charge connector

Dimensions
- Wheelbase: 94.9 in (2,410 mm)
- Length: 156.7 in (3,980 mm)
- Width: 66.7 in (1,694 mm)
- Height: 64.4 in (1,636 mm)
- Curb weight: 3,440 lb (1,560 kg)

The first fleet version of the RAV4 EV became available on a limited basis in 1997. In 2001 it was possible for businesses, cities or utilities to lease one or two of these cars. Toyota then actually sold or leased 328 RAV4 EVs to the general public in 2003, at which time the program was terminated despite waiting lists of prospective customers. Overall, approximately 1,900 units were sold or leased through 2003, of which approximately 1,500 in the U.S. and 400 in Japan.

The RAV4 EV closely resembles the regular internal combustion engine (ICE) version - without a tailpipe - and has a governed top speed of 78 mph (126 km/h) with an EPA rated range of 95 mi (153 km). The 95 amp-hour nickel–metal hydride battery (NiMH) has a capacity of 27.4 kWh, charges inductively and has proven to be very durable. Some RAV4 EVs have been driven more than 150,000 miles (240,000 km) using the original battery pack. It was also one of the few vehicles with a single speed gearbox when introduced to the market.

Beyond the unusual power train (batteries, controller and motor), the remaining systems in the RAV4 EV are comparable to the gasoline-powered RAV4. The power brakes, power steering, tire wear and suspension components are similar except that they use electric power sources. The power brakes use an electric pump to provide vacuum instead of deriving vacuum from the engine manifold. The power steering use an electric motor instead of mechanical energy delivered by fan belts. The passenger compartment is heated and cooled electrically using a heat pump (the first fleet application of a heat pump in a road vehicle).

=== Performance ===
The RAV4 EV production has a governed top speed of 137 km/h (85 mph), a tested 0 to 60 mph (97 km/h) time of around 18 seconds (depending on state-of-charge on the batteries). Its EPA rated driving range is 95 miles (153 km) with an EPA combined fuel economy rating of 43 kW·h/100 mi (equivalent to 78 MPGe). Actual fuel economy and range depends on the same factors as a traditional gasoline-powered vehicle including rolling resistance and average speed (aerodynamic drag).

The RAV4 EV battery pack uses 24 12-volt, 95Ah NiMH batteries capable of storing 27 kWh of energy.

=== Charging ===
Production vehicles use the Magne Charge connector, a inductive charging paddle produced by General Motors subsidiary Delco Electronics also used on other electric vehicles of the time including the EV1 and Chevy S10 EV. The inlet was mounted on the front grille of the vehicle. When using a 6 kW charging unit on a 240-volt, 30-amp circuit, the RAV4 EV's batteries can be recharged from being fully depleted to fully charged in about five hours, the process monitored by a passive battery balancing system.

Some RAV4 EV prototypes were charged via a front fender mounted conductive charger coupling made by Yazaki Corporation.

=== Mileage costs ===
Charging a RAV4 EV from full-dead to full-charge uses approximately 30 kW·h of electricity; the excess above the battery pack capacity is used by the charging system. At a rate of US$0.09 per kilowatt-hour, this costs around US$2.70. As of May 2008, based on a gasoline price-per-gallon cost of US$3.80 and up and the non-EV 2003 RAV4 2-wheel-drive gasoline fuel efficiency of 27 mpg_{‑US} (8.7 L/100 km; 32 mpg_{‑imp}), the RAV4 EV costs approximately 5 times less a per mile basis, and makes mileage in the RAV4 EV the cost equivalent to a 111.1 mpg_{‑US} (2.117 L/100 km; 133.4 mpg_{‑imp}) small SUV.

In addition, the RAV4 EV has a charge timer built into the dashboard that enables the vehicle to start charging at a specific time. As the RAV4 EV easily becomes the main cost of electricity in an average-sized home, this enables the owner to use a Time-Of-Day Meter to reduce electricity costs. This configuration is a standard practice with RAV4 EV owners. The price of electricity at night depends on the carrier, but is usually in the range of 60% of the normal rate. In the use of charging the RAV4 EV, this equates to a cheaper cost-per-mile, roughly equivalent to a vehicle capable of 166.6 mpg_{‑US} (1.412 L/100 km; 200.1 mpg_{‑imp}), based on a price of US$3.00 per gallon.

The United States Environmental Protection Agency listed mileage ratings for the RAV4 EV in its yearly Fuel Economy Guide from 2000 through 2003. The 2003 model recorded fuel efficiency of 39 kW·h/100 mi city, 49 kW·h/100 mi highway; the city mileage rating was equivalent to 125 mpg_{‑US} (1.88 L/100 km; 150 mpg_{‑imp}), and 100 mpg_{‑US} (2.4 L/100 km; 120 mpg_{‑imp}) on the highway. The EPA rated combined mileage was 112 mpg_{‑US} (2.10 L/100 km; 135 mpg_{‑imp}).

In 2007, the EPA updated its rating system and revised the ratings to a city equivalent of 87 mpg_{‑US} (2.7 L/100 km; 104 mpg_{‑imp}), highway equivalent of 69 mpg_{‑US} (3.4 L/100 km; 83 mpg_{‑imp}), and a combined equivalent of 78 mpg_{‑US} (3.0 L/100 km; 94 mpg_{‑imp}).

=== Consumable items ===
The RAV4 EV's battery system is a consumable item. Toyota reports that battery pack replacement costs are currently higher than the value of the used vehicle. Toyota tested the RAV4 EV in Japan for 300,000 miles (480,000 km) over two years before introducing the vehicle in the United States. The economies of scale are affecting the replacement cost of the RAV4 EV.

=== Prototyping ===
RAV4 EV pre-production prototypes were first released in a confidential evaluation program with electric utilities throughout the U.S. These prototypes were based on the smaller, shorter, two-door version of the RAV4. The prototypes included some versions fitted with Panasonic NiMH batteries, and others with high-performance Panasonic lead–acid PbA batteries (the same ones that eventually found their way into the EV1 and other production GM electric vehicles). The RAV4 EV prototypes also were equipped with on-board level 2 chargers and connected via a front fender conductive charger coupling made by Yazaki Corporation. Both prototypes were well accepted.

The utility employee evaluators did not have to personally pay for the more costly and advanced NiMH batteries, and the NiMH RAV4 EV prototype received better reviews, due to its increased range. Its energy efficiency, however, was not as good as the PbA version. Due to the impracticality of developing two battery types for a limited volume program, Toyota opted for the higher-performance, higher-cost NiMH RAV4 EV. This resulted in a greater manufacturing cost, and higher purchase price.

A number of electric vehicle advocates voiced disappointment that the choice was made to manufacture only the NiMH version. Many electric vehicle advocates claimed that automaker's choice of the NiMH battery worked against the 1990s deployment of cost-effective electric vehicles based on PbA batteries, and that further development of lead–acid technology could result in performance equal to NiMH, but at a substantially lower price. Their argument was that a usable electric vehicle is possible at a substantially lower price, and that the lower purchase price would foster greater acceptance of electric vehicles. In fact, lithium-ion batteries soon displaced both nickel and lead from electromobiles.

=== Corporate purchasing ===
Initially, RAV4 EVs were only available for three-year fleet lease, not for sale and not for lease to the public, at a few dealerships beginning in 1997. From 2001, leases were made available to small "fleets of one" purportedly run by small businesses.

=== Public availability ===
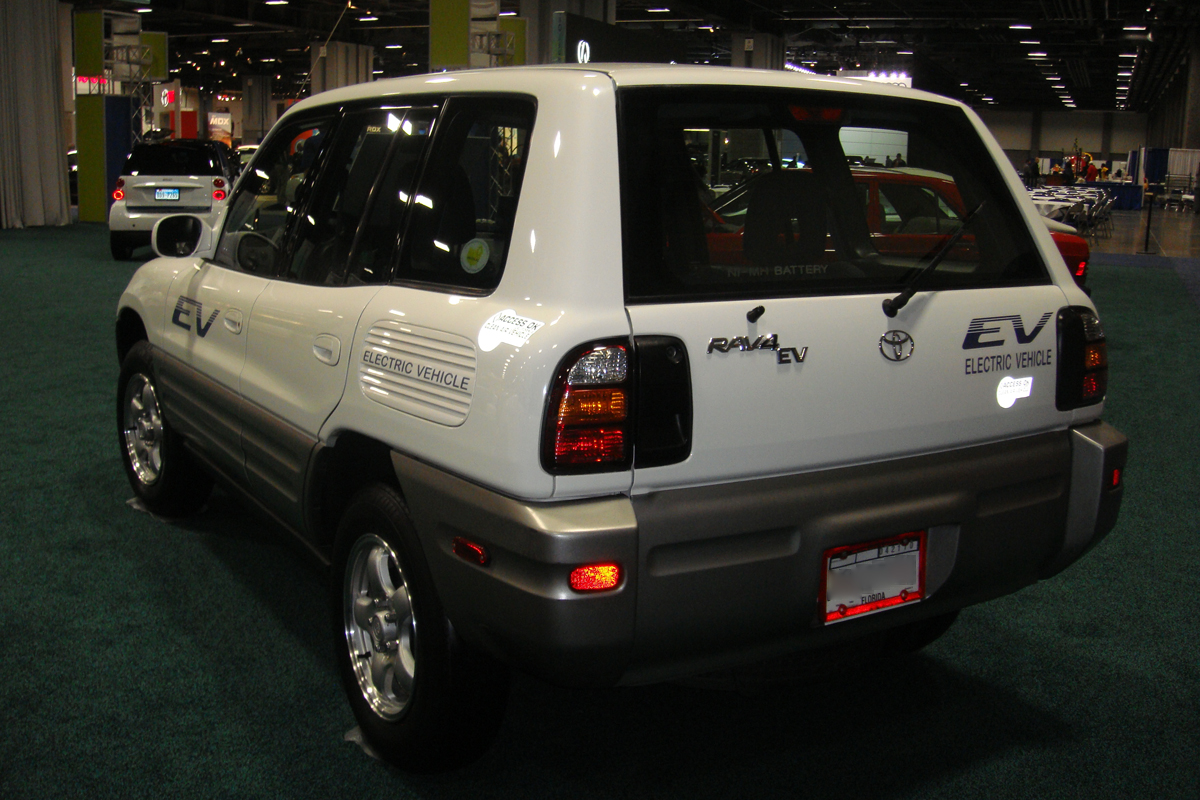
Rear view of one of the 328 RAV4 EVs available to the public.

In March 2002, due to a shift in corporate policy, the Toyota RAV4-EV was made available for sale to the general public. All 328 that Toyota made were sold. No one knows for certain what prompted Toyota to change their position on the RAV4-EV, since they had long since fulfilled their obligations under the MOA with the California Air Resources Board's zero-emissions vehicle (ZEV) mandate via its fleet lease program.

The MSRP was US$42,000; but in California, ZIP-grant rebates of US$9,000, decreasing in 2003 to US$5,000, and a US$4,000 credit from the Internal Revenue Service brought the price down to a more palatable US$29,000 (US$33,000 for some 2003 deliveries), including the home charger.

More RAV4-EVs were sold than had been planned for manufacture through standard assembly line techniques. Toyota filled every order despite the fact that the last few dozen vehicles had to be assembled from spare parts due to a shortfall of production components (a significantly more expensive way of building a vehicle). This unexpected development caused deliveries to trickle on into September 2003. It also caused variations in the vehicles such as heated seats, retractable antennae, mats, etc.

The last of the 328 EVs was sold in November 2002.

=== Sales ===
In the eight years up to 2003, the RAV4 EV achieved a sales performance of approximately 1,900 units, of which 1,484 were leased and/or sold in California.

=== Chevron patent encumbrance ===
Whether or not Toyota wanted to continue production, it was unlikely to be able to do so because the battery was no longer available. Chevron had inherited control of the worldwide patent rights for the NiMH battery when it merged with Texaco, which had purchased them from General Motors. Chevron's unit won a US$30,000,000 settlement from Toyota and Panasonic, the manufacturer of the battery, and the production line for the large NiMH batteries was closed down and dismantled. This case was settled in the ICC International Court of Arbitration, and not publicized due to a gag order placed on Toyota. Only smaller NiMH batteries, incapable of powering an electric vehicle or plugging in, were allowed by Chevron-Texaco.

== Second generation (2012) ==
Second generation
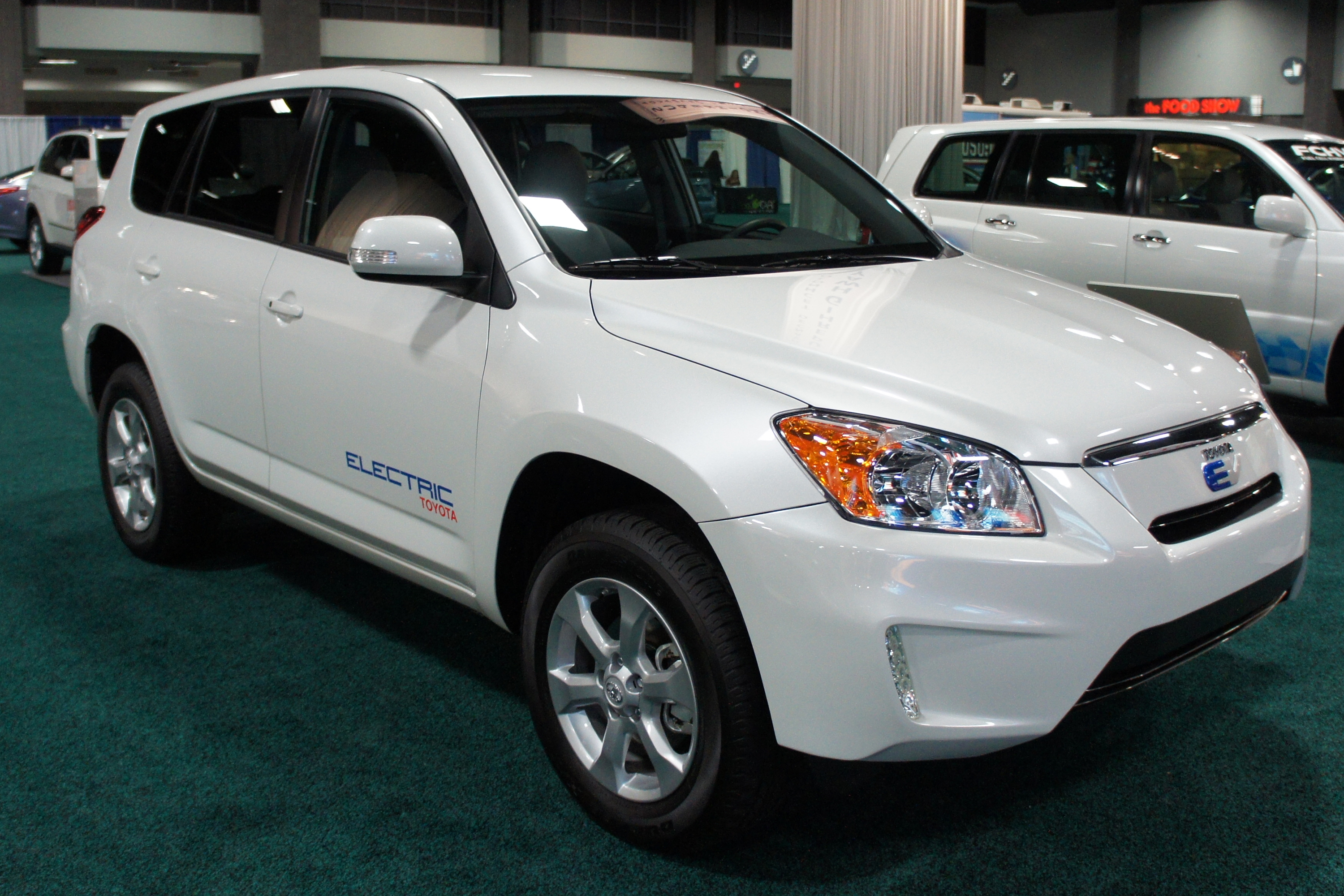
- Toyota RAV4 EV second generation (QEA38)

Overview
- Production: 2012–2014
- Assembly: Canada: Woodstock, Ontario (TMMC)

Powertrain
- Electric motor: 115 kW (154 hp) AC induction motor from Tesla Motors
- Transmission: Single-speed transaxle, 9.73:1 ratio
- Battery: Panasonic 41.8 kWh lithium-ion
- Range: 103 mi (166 km) (EPA)
- Plug-in charging: 9.6 kW 100–240 V onboard charger for 1Φ 40 A using SAE J1772 connector

Dimensions
- Wheelbase: 2,560–2,660 mm (100.8–104.7 in)
- Length: 4,395–4,620 mm (173.0–181.9 in)
- Width: 1,815–1,855 mm (71.5–73.0 in)
- Curb weight: 4,030 lb (1,830 kg)

The second generation RAV4 EV was released in September 2012 starting at a price of US$49,800 before any government incentives. Toyota also offered a 36-month lease option at US$599 per month with down payment of US$3,499. The RAV4 EV was sold only in California, and sales began in the San Francisco Bay Area, Los Angeles/Orange County and San Diego. Production was limited to 2,600 during three years. The RAV4 EV was available to individual consumers and fleet customers. Due to the capacity of its battery pack the RAV4 EV qualified for the maximum US$7,500 federal tax credit and also was eligible for a US$2,500 rebate in California. A total of 192 units were sold during 2012 and 1,096 during 2013. A total of 2,489 units were sold in the U.S. through April 2015. The production run ended in September 2014.

=== History ===
The first prototype was built in just three weeks after the signing of a joint development agreement where Toyota helped the then fledgling electric automaker Tesla start production in the NUMMI factory Toyota was vacating in Fremont, California. Toyota's partner Panasonic was also involved in the development, just as when Toyota developed the first generation of the RAV4 EV. The electric SUV was developed by Tesla and Toyota Technical Center U.S.A. in Michigan. Testing began in July 2010.

A demonstrator was unveiled at the November 2010 Los Angeles Auto Show. Toyota built 35 of these converted RAV4s (Phase Zero vehicles) for a demonstration and evaluation program that ran through 2011. The lithium metal-oxide battery and other power train components were supplied by Tesla. These prototypes had a 660 lb (299 kg) lithium-ion battery pack with a 50 kWh total capacity (37 kWh usable) and achieved a range of between 80 and 120 mi (130 and 190 km). The prototypes used components from the Tesla Roadster (first generation).

On July 15, 2011, Tesla entered into a supply and services agreement with Toyota for the supply of a validated electric powertrain system, including a battery, charging system, inverter, motor, gearbox and associated software.

The re-engineered RAV4 EV production version (Phase One vehicle) was unveiled at the May 2012 International Electric Vehicle Symposium in Los Angeles. Production models use the SAE J1772 charging standard. The battery pack, electronics and powertrain components in the production version are similar to those in used in the Tesla Model S sedan launched in June 2012.

=== Powertrain ===
The second generation RAV4 EV combines an electric powertrain from Tesla and a battery produced by Panasonic in a chassis built by Toyota.

The electric motor supplied by Tesla is an AC induction motor, a departure from Toyota's practice of using synchronous permanent-magnet motors in their hybrid electric vehicles. A fixed-gear open-differential transaxle has a gear ratio of 9.73. The RAV4 EV weighs 4,030 lb (1,830 kg), 470 lb (210 kg) heavier than a front-wheel drive RAV4 Limited with the V-6 engine.

The RAV 4 offers two drive modes: Normal and Sport. Peak power output of the motor is 115 kW (154 hp), with peak torque in normal mode of 296 N⋅m (220 ft⋅lb), and peak torque in sport mode of 370 N⋅m (270 ft⋅lb). Maximum vehicle speed in Normal mode is 85 mph (137 km/h), and maximum in Sport mode, which also has a more aggressive accelerator pedal feel, is 100 mph (160 km/h). The US Environmental Protection Agency rated the RAV4 EV combined economy at 76 miles per gallon gasoline equivalent (44 kW⋅h/100 mi) , with 78 mpg‑e (43 kW⋅h/100 mi) in city driving and 74 mpg‑e (46 kW⋅h/100 mi) on highways. While the quarter mile time is not officially rated from Toyota, the RAV4 EV (FWD) Facebook community has posted dragslip results of 15.71s at 85.5 mph (137.6 km/h). This is only marginally slower than the RAV4 V6 AWD (with 269HP) which has published quarter mile times of 14.8-14.9 at 93 mph (150 km/h).

=== Battery and range ===
The battery pack is a 386 V lithium-ion battery pack comprising about 4,500 cells and rated at 41.8 kW·h of usable energy at full charge, with a maximum power output of 129 kW. The RAV4 EV features a 10 kW onboard charger (SAE J1772 240 V, 40 A input). The battery pack is located below the floorpan, reducing the ground clearance as compared with the gasoline-powered version by a couple of inches, but the electric SUV's cargo space of 36.4 cubic feet (1.03 m^{3}) is the same as its gasoline sibling. The battery pack weighs 840 lb (380 kg) and because it is located in the lowest part of the vehicle, the lower center of gravity provides a better handling than the conventional Toyota RAV4.

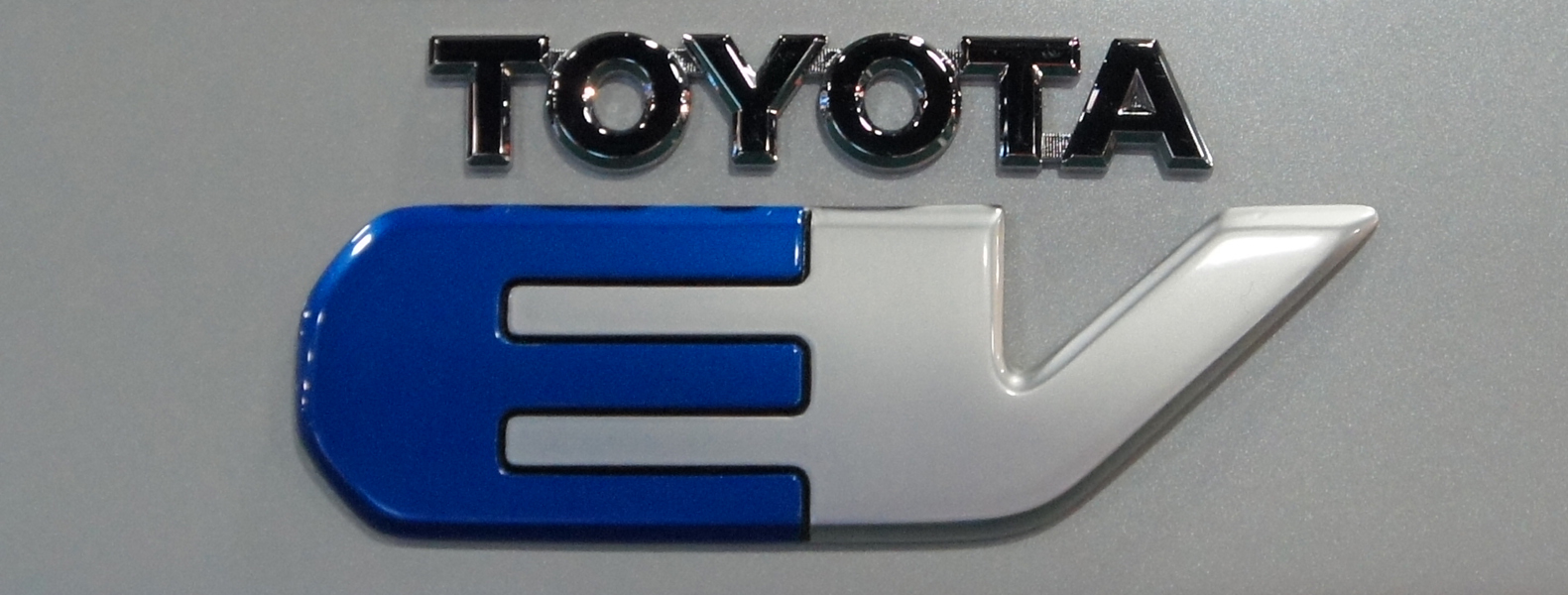
Toyota electric car badge used in the RAV4 EV

The RAV4 EV has two charge modes: Standard and Extended. In standard mode, the high voltage battery charges only up to 35 kWh and Toyota expected the electric SUV to achieve an EPA driving range rating of 92 mi (148 km) for this charging mode. Extended mode allows the battery to charge to its full usable capacity of 41.8 kWh, providing an expected EPA driving range of 113 mi (182 km) according to Toyota estimates. The EPA rated just one range of 103 mi (166 km). Standard mode is designed to optimize battery life over range; however, the 8-year, 100,000-mile battery warranty cover the packs regardless of the mix of charge modes over the pack's life. However, due to EPA's procedures, Toyota expects the Monroney label to show the combined range of 103 mi (166 km).

Charging time with a 40 A/240 V charging station is 5 hours in Standard Mode and 6 hours for Extended Mode; the onboard charger delivers 9.6 kW. Toyota had arranged with Leviton to offer a custom level 2 charging station priced at US$1,590 including basic installation. On the other end of the scale, and due to its large battery pack, charging at 120 volts with the cord that comes standard under the rear deck takes 44 hours for Standard Mode and 52 hours for Extended Mode. An aftermarket company called Quick Charge Power has come up with a way to add 48 kW CHAdeMO DC Quick Charging to the RAV4ev which dramatically shortens charge times for the 41.8 kWh battery. This can make the car tremendously more useful in areas where this charging infrastructure exists.

=== Production ===
The RAV4 EV began assembly in 2012 at Toyota Motor Manufacturing Canada in Woodstock, Ontario alongside the regular gasoline version. Tesla built the electric powertrain at its plant at Toyota's old NUMMI facility, now the Tesla Fremont Factory, in Fremont, California, and then shipped them to Canada. About 2,500 RAV4 EV vehicles were built between 2012 and 2014. The battery supply deal between Toyota and Tesla concluded with the end of production in August 2014. In 2017, Toyota sold all its shares in Tesla.

== See also ==
- Patent encumbrance of large automotive NiMH batteries
- Chevron Corporation
- Toyota
- Tesla Motors
- Electric vehicle
- Battery electric vehicle
- PZEV
- SULEV
- AT-PZEV
- Energy Conversion Devices Ovonics
- Government incentives for plug-in electric vehicles
- List of electric cars currently available
- List of modern production plug-in electric vehicles
- Plug-in electric vehicle
