= Chevrolet S-10 EV =

Chevrolet S-10 Electric
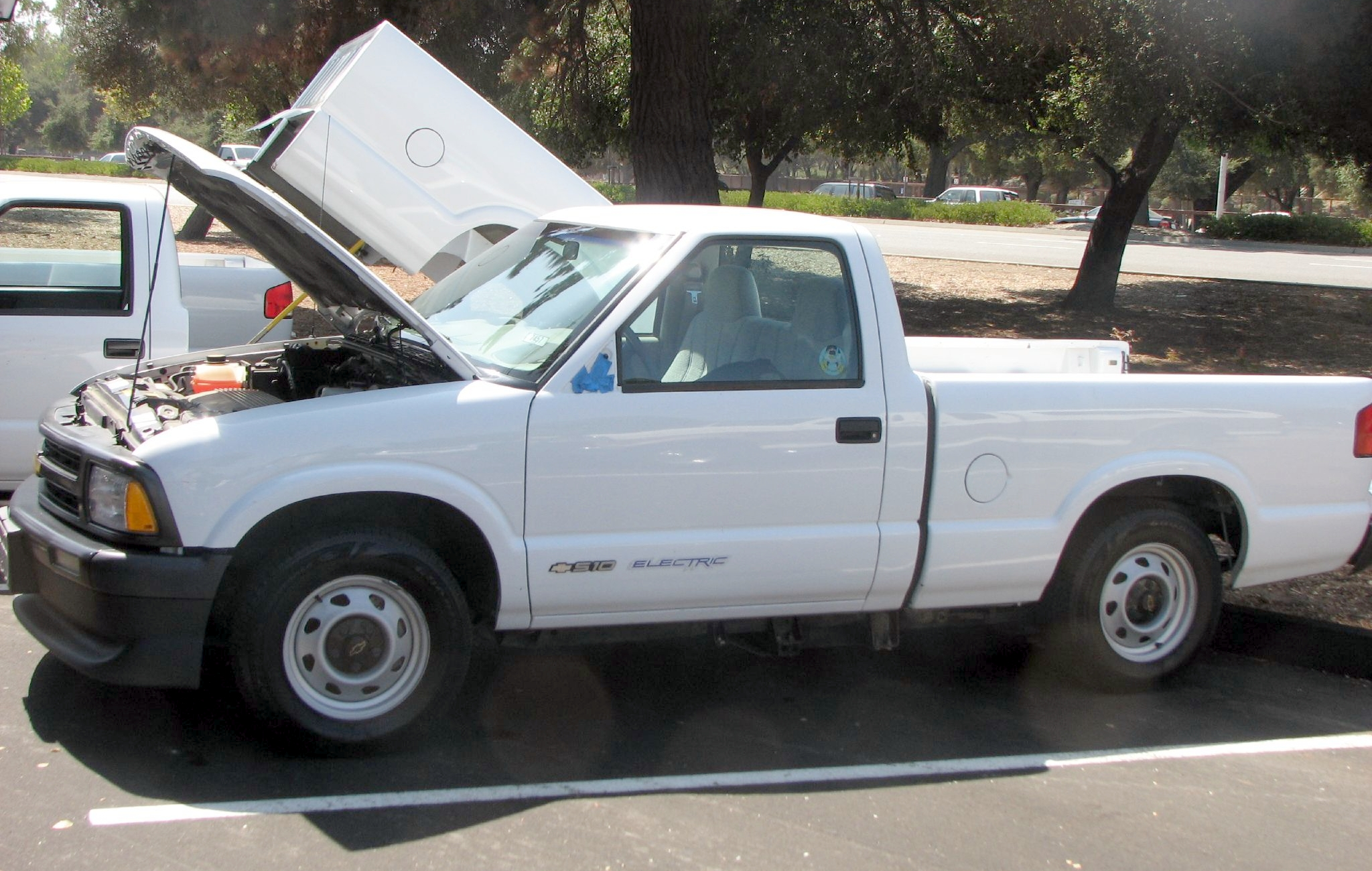
- Chevrolet S-10 Electric

Overview
- Manufacturer: General Motors
- Also called: S-10E; S-10 EV; E10; E14
- Production: 1997–1998
- Model years: 1997–1998
- Assembly: United States: Shreveport, Louisiana (Shreveport Operations)

Body and chassis
- Class: Compact pickup truck
- Body style: 2-door regular cab
- Layout: Front-motor, front-wheel drive
- Platform: GMT 325
- Related: GM EV1; Chevrolet S-10 (2nd generation)

Powertrain
- Electric motor: 85 kW (114 hp) AC induction motor
- Transmission: 1-speed fixed gear
- Battery: 16.2 kWh lead acid; 29 kWh nickel-metal hydride
- Electric range: 16.2 kWh: 33 mi (53 km) (EPA); 43.8 mi (70.5 km) (J1634); 29 kWh: 72 mi (116 km) (EPA); 95.3 mi (153.4 km) (J1634)
- Plug-in charging: 6.6 kW on-board charger, Magne Charge inductive connector

Dimensions
- Wheelbase: 108.3 in (2,751 mm)
- Length: 188.9 in (4,798 mm) (1997); 190.8 in (4,846 mm) (1998)
- Width: 67.8 in (1,722 mm) (1997); 68.3 in (1,735 mm) (1998)
- Height: 62.4 in (1,585 mm)
- Curb weight: 4,230 lb (1,919 kg) (1997); 4,199 lb (1,905 kg) (1998)

The Chevrolet S-10 Electric was an American electric compact pickup truck built by Chevrolet. It was introduced in 1997, becoming the world's first electric pickup truck from the original manufacturer, updated in 1998, and then discontinued. It was an OEM BEV variant of Chevrolet's S-10 pickup truck. The S-10 Electric was solely powered by electricity (batteries) and was marketed primarily to utility fleet customers.

== Design ==
General Motors started with a regular-cab, short-box (6-foot (180 cm) bed) S-10 pickup, with a base-level trim package plus a half-tonneau cover. In place of a typical inline four cylinder or V-6 internal combustion engine, the electric S-10 EV was equipped with an 85-kilowatt (114 hp) three-phase, liquid-cooled AC induction motor, based on GM's EV1 electric coupe. The EV1 had a 100 kW motor; GM reduced the S-10 EV's motor output because of the additional weight and drag of the truck so as not to overstress the batteries.

Because the S-10 EV shared its major powertrain components with the GM EV1, it used a front wheel drive configuration, as opposed to the rear wheel drive (two-wheel-drive) configuration of the gasoline-powered S-10. Its closest competitor, the electric Ford Ranger EV was also rear wheel drive.

=== Batteries ===
Similar to the Gen 1 EV1's, there were lead acid battery and nickel–metal hydride battery options. The 1997 Chevrolet S-10 EV used a lead acid battery pack. Manufactured by Delco Electronics, the 1,400 lb (635 kg) battery pack consisted of 27 cells, with one being designated as an "auxiliary" cell. These reportedly offered 16.2 kilowatt-hours for propulsion. In 1998, an Ovonic nickel–metal hydride battery (NiMH) pack was also available; these batteries were lighter (1,043 lb or 473 kg) and had a combined 29 kilowatt-hours of storage for a longer range. NiMH also has longer life but costs more than the lead acid option. The battery pack was located between the frame rails, beneath the pickup bed. On all battery types, a passive battery monitoring and management system was used; this meant that excess energy was wasted from cells with a higher charge, while the remainder of the cells reach the same state of charge.

=== Charging ===
The S-10 EV charges using the Magne Charger, produced by the General Motors subsidiary Delco Electronics. The inductive charging paddle is the model J1773 or the 'large' paddle. The small paddle can also be used with an adapter to properly seat it. The standard charger is a 240 V 30 A (6.6 kW); there is also a 120 V 15 A 'convenience' charger, and a high-power fast-charge version. The vehicle's charging port is accessed by flipping the front license plate frame downwards. The system is designed to be safe even when used in the rain.

=== Efficiency ===
Depending on the load and driving conditions the range can vary greatly: For the 1997 model with lead-acid battery pack, city range was 45.5 miles (73.2 km); the mixed city/highway range was 47 miles (76 km); the highway range was 60 miles (97 km) if operating constantly at 45 mph (72 km/h) or less. The acceleration time 0–50 mph (0–80 km/h) was listed as 13.5 seconds (at 50 percent battery charge - the published literature stated that acceleration time was "even less" when the truck had a full charge).

Like the EV1, the top speed of the S-10 EV was governed, albeit to 70 mph (113 km/h), 10 mph (16 km/h) less than its coupe sibling.

The performance is much better for the 1998 model year with the nickel–metal hydride battery, at an approximately 90-mile (140 km) range and an acceleration time of 10.9 seconds at 50% charge.

- 1997 MY GM S-10 EV lead acid: 29.2 kWh/100 mi (115 mpg‑e)
- 1998 MY GM S10 EV lead acid: 45 kWh/100 mi (75 mpg‑e) (city driving), and 41 kWh/100 mi (82 mpg‑e) (highway driving, with maximum speed 45 mph, 72 km/h or less).
- 1998 MY GM S10 EV NiMH: 94 kWh/100 mi (36 mpg‑e) (city driving), and 86 kWh/100 mi (39 mpg‑e) (highway driving, with maximum speed 45 mph, 72 km/h or less).

Note: 1998 GM S10 EV NiMh numbers above are apparently wrong. This page lists the NiMH S10 with a 29-kilowatt-hour battery and range of 72 mi (116 km) (EPA) which corresponds to 403 Wh/mi (84 mpg‑e). This corresponds to the NiMH version of the vehicle having a 357-pound (162 kg) lighter battery pack than the lead-acid model.

- 1997 MY GM S10 EV lead acid: 292 Wh/mi (115 mpg‑e) (J1634)
- 1998 MY GM S10 EV NiMH: 276 Wh/mi (122 mpg‑e) (J1634)

=== Instruments ===
Internally, the instrument cluster was exclusive to the electric S-10, and featured only four gauges - a speedometer, a large "charge" gauge which reads from 'E' to 'F' like a fuel gauge, a voltmeter ranging from 220 to 440 volts, and a "power use" meter, which acts as an ammeter of sorts showing discharge during acceleration and charge during regenerative braking. The LCD for the shifter was shortened to display only park, neutral, reverse, and drive, since the S-10 EV does not have the usual transmission.

=== Additional features ===
The S-10 EV was developed from the base version of the gasoline-powered S10, and included similar standard equipment. Standard equipment for the S-10 EV included an AM-FM stereo radio with two door-mounted speakers, air conditioning, a vinyl-and-cloth-trimmed bench seat, and dual airbags. For colder climates, a fuel-fired heater was standard, which is similar to an engine block heater, and runs on diesel fuel from a 1.7-US-gallon (6.4 L) tank positioned where the gasoline tank would normally be, with a small exhaust behind the spare wheel. The heater will operate when ambient temperature falls below 37 °F (3 °C).

Because battery performance varies greatly with temperature, the heat pump supplies cooling to the batteries during charging when necessary. Passive air recirculation is used during the driving cycle to equalize variations in battery temperature. The heat pump can be activated during the driving cycle under extreme battery over-temperature conditions over 150 °F (66 °C), typically as a result of extreme battery discharge.

== History ==
The S-10 EV was preceded by at least two commercially marketed S-10 electric vehicle conversions performed by third parties:

- Solectria Corporation E-10 (introduced in May 1993 at the American Tour de Sol)
- U.S. Electricar Pickup (introduced in 1994)

=== 1998 updates ===
While the standard S-10 moved to a redesigned front fascia in 1998, the S-10 Electric kept the same front fascia as the '94-'97, with the exception of composite headlamps in 1998 versus the previous year's sealed-beam headlamps. The interior was also updated in 1998 along with internal combustion models, adding a passenger side airbag, a new AM-FM stereo radio, new instrumentation with a digital odometer and trip meter, a new bench seat design, new interior door panels, and a new steering wheel with airbag cover. Aside from this header panel, a unique lower bumper valance, and a stylized 'Electric' decal on the bottom of the doors, there is little difference externally between the appearance of an Electric and a stock S-10. Any changes, however minimal, were reported to have had a positive influence on reducing the truck's aerodynamic resistance. These changes included a closed grille and a front air dam, belly pans beneath the front suspension, a seal between the cab and the pickup bed, and a half-length tonneau cover over the rear of the pickup bed.

=== Sales ===
Unlike the EV1, of the 492 S-10 EVs assembled about 60 were sold to fleet customers, rather than just leased through restrictive programs, mostly due to the prior Department of Transportation crashworthiness evaluations done on stock S-10 pickups. As a result, a few Electric S-10s can still be found in use today. The fleet life of many of these ended in 2007 and 2008. The vehicles (around 440) that were not sold were eventually scrapped, similar to the fate of their EV1 siblings. The white S-10 EVs can be seen mixed into the stacks of crushed EV1s in aerial shots toward the end of "Who Killed The Electric Car", most easily identified by their white color, and black half-tonneau covers.

The purpose of the vehicle, though, was primarily to explore the potential of electric trucks early in the history of electric vehicles:

There were many fleet-type customers with duty cycles that represented good applications for electric vehicles — short drives that could be all electric, then back to the same location for charging each night. The goals were to test the capability of that type of vehicle, to understand that customer base and see how this vehicle would fit that profile, and to test what relevance it would have to those customers' needs

— Gary Insana

=== Recent uses ===
In 2004 GM converted an S-10 EV to rear-wheel drive, using prototype in-wheel electric motors instead of an under-hood motor.
