= History of Tesla, Inc. =

Corporate history of the American electric vehicle manufacturer

Tesla, Inc. is an electric vehicle manufacturer and clean energy company founded in San Carlos, California on July 1, 2003 by American entrepreneurs Martin Eberhard and Marc Tarpenning, before Elon Musk became CEO of Tesla in 2008. In 2009, as the result of a lawsuit, Elon Musk retroactively became a co-founder of Tesla. The company is named after Serbian-American inventor Nikola Tesla. Tesla is the world's leading electric vehicle manufacturer by market cap. As of 2023, Tesla's global vehicle sales were 1.77 million units annually, the 14th-highest total among auto manufacturers worldwide.

== The beginnings – Roadster and private funding ==
Tesla was incorporated (as Tesla Motors) on July 1, 2003, by Martin Eberhard and Marc Tarpenning in San Carlos, California. The founders were influenced to start the company after General Motors recalled all its EV1 electric cars in 2003 and then destroyed them, and seeing the higher fuel efficiency of battery-electric cars as an opportunity to break the usual correlation between high performance and low fuel economy in automobiles. The AC Propulsion tzero also inspired the company's first vehicle, the Roadster. Eberhard said he wanted to build "a car manufacturer that is also a technology company", with its core technologies as "the battery, the computer software, and the proprietary motor".

Ian Wright was the third employee, joining a few months later. The three went looking for venture capital (VC) funding in January 2004 and connected with Elon Musk, who contributed US$6.5 million of the initial (Series A) US$7.5 million round of investment in February 2004 and became chairman of the board of directors. Musk then appointed Eberhard as the CEO. J.B. Straubel joined in May 2004 as the fifth employee. A lawsuit settlement agreed to by Eberhard and Tesla in September 2009 allows all five (Eberhard, Tarpenning, Wright, Musk and Straubel) to call themselves co-founders.

Musk took an active role within the company and oversaw Roadster product design, but was not deeply involved in day-to-day business operations. Musk insisted from the beginning on a carbon-fiber-reinforced polymer body and contributed to the car style. Tesla Motors received the Global Green 2006 product design award for the design of the Tesla Roadster, presented by Mikhail Gorbachev. Elon Musk, Martin Eberhard, Barney Hatt, Tesla Motors also received the 2007 Index Design award for their design of the Tesla Roadster.

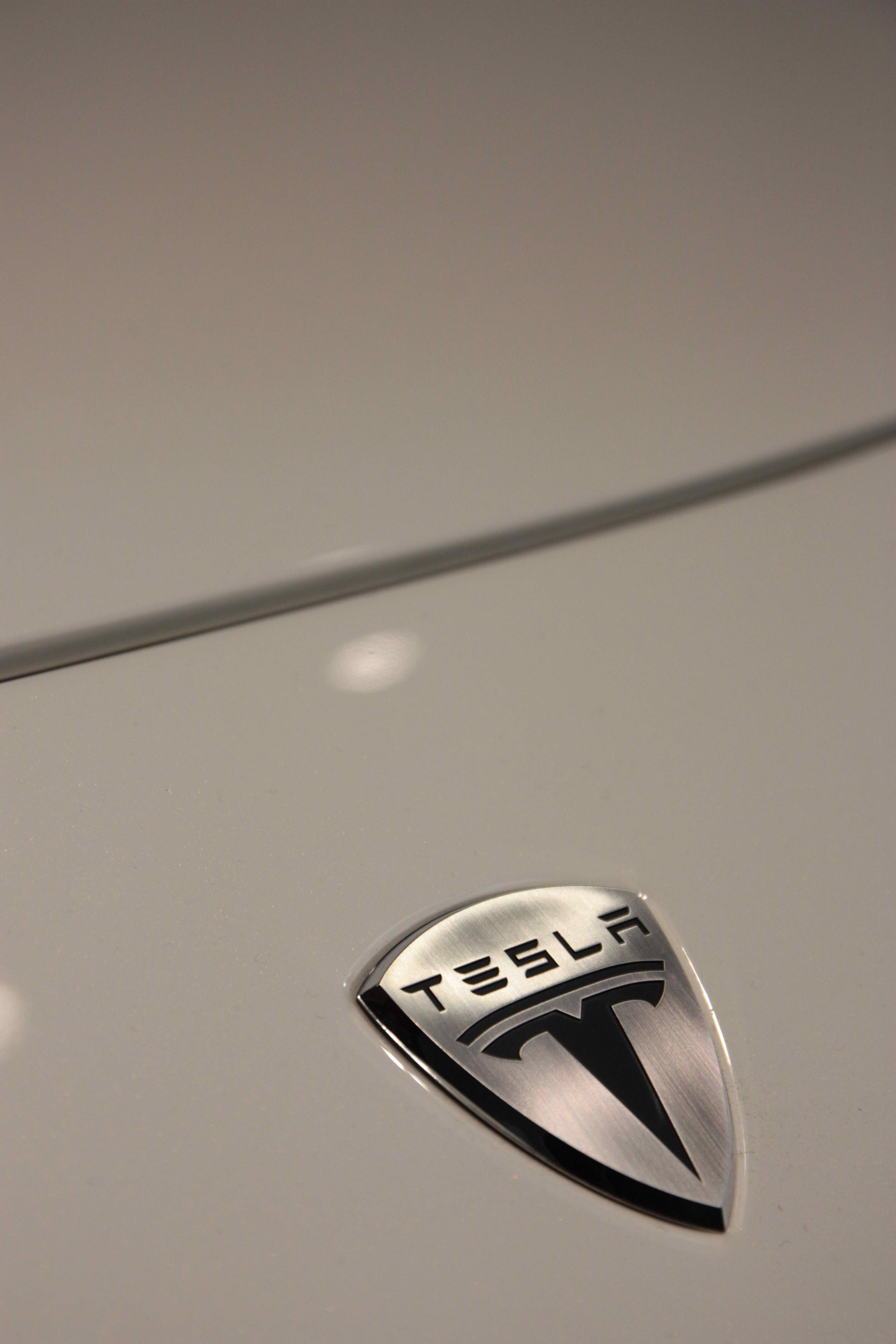
The insignia of Tesla Motors as seen on a Tesla Roadster Sport

Musk consistently maintained that Tesla's long-term strategic goal was to create affordable mass market electric vehicles. Tesla's goal was to start with a premium sports car aimed at early adopters before moving into more mainstream vehicles including sedans and affordable compacts.

In February 2005, Musk led Tesla's Series B US$13 million investment round which added Valor Equity Partners to the funding team. Musk co-led the third, US$40 million round in May 2006 along with Technology Partners. This round included investment from prominent entrepreneurs including Google co-founders Sergey Brin & Larry Page, former eBay President Jeff Skoll, Hyatt heir Nick Pritzker and added the VC firms Draper Fisher Jurvetson, Capricorn Management, and The Bay Area Equity Fund managed by JPMorgan Chase. Musk led the fourth round in May 2008 which added another US$400,167,530 in debt financing, and brought the total investments to over US$100 million through private financing.

Also in the 2006 "Tesla master plan" a partnership with SolarCity was announced to co-market photovoltaic solar panels, which could be installed on the roof of a carport, allowing those who drive less than 350 miles/week to become "energy positive" with respect to personal transport.

Eberhard served as CEO until he was asked to step down from the position in August 2007 by the board of directors. Eberhard then took the title of "President of Technology" before ultimately leaving the company in January 2008. Co-founder Marc Tarpenning, who served as the Vice President of Electrical Engineering of the company, also left the company in January 2008. In August 2007, Michael Marks was brought in as interim CEO, and in December 2007, Ze'ev Drori became CEO and President. In January 2008, Tesla fired several key personnel who had been involved from the inception after a performance review by the new CEO. According to Musk, Tesla was forced to reduce the company workforce by about 10% to lower its burn rate, which was out of control in 2007. In May 2008, "The Truth About Cars" website launched a "Tesla Death Watch", as Tesla needed another round of financing to survive. In October 2008, Musk succeeded Drori as CEO and fired 25% of Tesla employees. Drori became vice-chairman, but then left the company in December 2008. In December a fifth round of investment turned into debt financing and added another US$40 million, avoiding bankruptcy.

By January 2009, Tesla had raised US$187 million and delivered 147 cars. Musk had contributed US$70 million of his own money to the company. On May 19, 2009, Germany's Daimler AG, maker of Mercedes-Benz, acquired an equity stake of less than 10% of Tesla for a reported US$50 million. According to Musk, the Daimler investment saved Tesla. In July 2009, Daimler announced that Abu Dhabi's Aabar Investments bought 40% of Daimler's interest in Tesla.

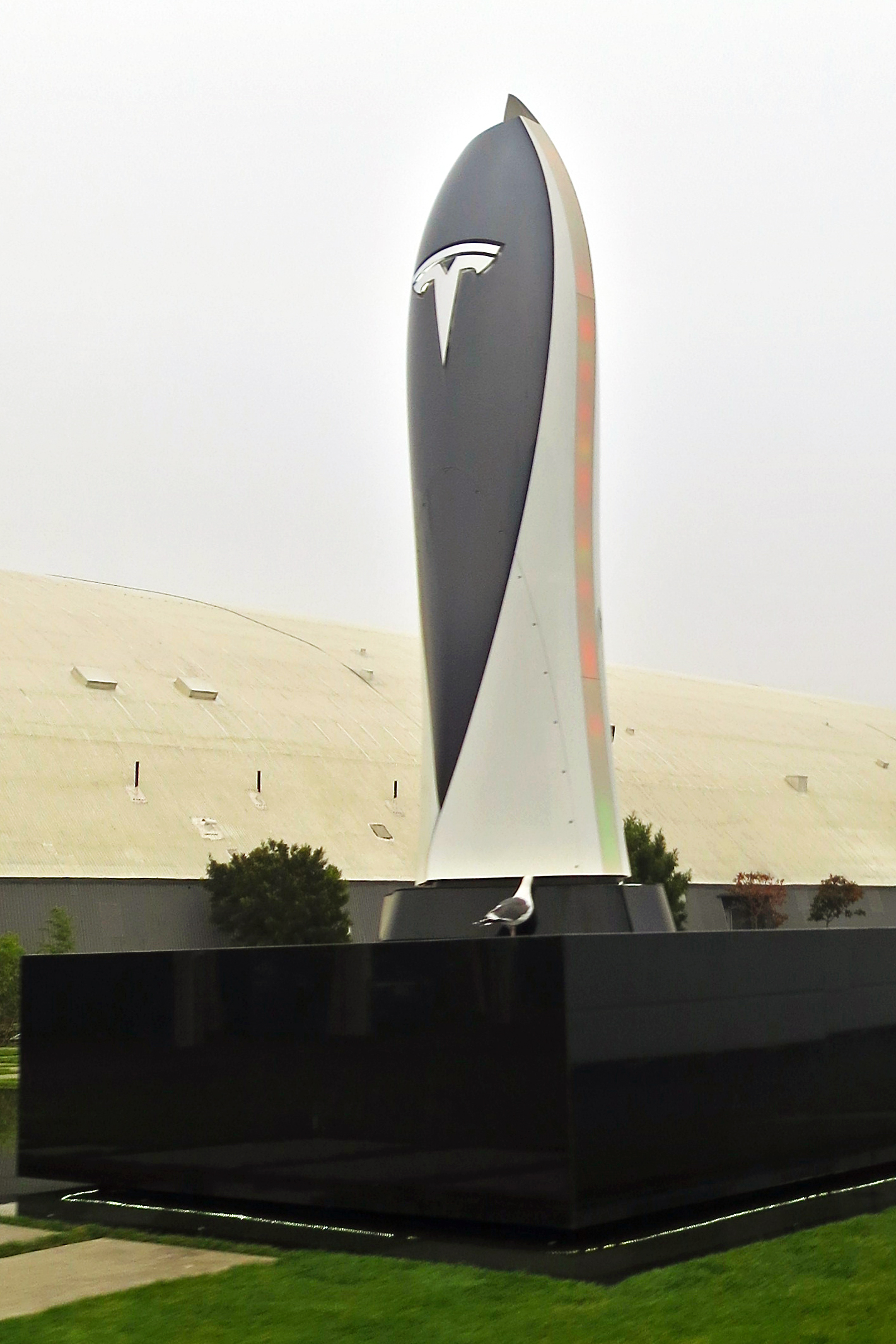
A Tesla obelisk used to identify the Supercharger network sites in California. (2012)

== 2009 Department of Energy loan ==
In June 2009, Tesla was approved to receive US$465 million in interest-bearing loans from the United States Department of Energy. The funding, part of the US$8 billion Advanced Technology Vehicles Manufacturing Loan Program, supported engineering and production of the Model S sedan, as well as the development of commercial powertrain technology. The low-interest loan program was created in 2007 during the George W. Bush administration, and is not related to the "bailout" funds that GM and Chrysler received, nor are they related to the 2009 economic stimulus package. Tesla repaid the loan in May 2013, with a US$12 million interest. Tesla was the first car company to have fully repaid the government; Nissan repaid their loan in 2017, while Fisker went bankrupt and defaulted on their loan.

The company announced in early August 2009 that it had achieved overall corporate profitability for the month of July 2009. The company said it earned approximately US$1 million on revenue of US$20 million. Profitability arose primarily from improved gross margin on the 2010 Roadster, the second iteration of Tesla's award-winning sports car. Tesla, which like all automakers records revenue when products are delivered, shipped a record 109 vehicles in July and reported a surge in new Roadster purchases. In September 2009, Tesla announced a US$82.5 million round to accelerate Tesla's retail expansion. Daimler participated in the round to maintain equity ownership from its initial investment.

== Lotus supply of Roadster parts ==
Tesla Motors signed a production contract on July 11, 2005, with Group Lotus to produce "gliders" (complete cars minus powertrain). The contract ran through March 2011, but the two automakers extended the deal to keep the electric Roadster in production through December 2011 with a minimum number of 2,400 units, when production ended, mostly because of tooling changes orchestrated by one of its suppliers. In June 2010, it was reported that Tesla sold a total of US$12.2 million zero emission vehicle credits to other automakers, including Honda, up to March 31, 2010.

== IPO and Model S ==
On January 29, 2010, Tesla Motors filed Form S-1 with the U.S. Securities and Exchange Commission, as a preliminary prospectus indicating its intention to file an initial public offering (IPO) underwritten by Goldman Sachs, Morgan Stanley, J. P. Morgan, and Deutsche Bank Securities. On May 21, 2010, Tesla announced a "strategic partnership" with Toyota, which agreed to purchase US$50 million in Tesla common stock issued in a private placement to close immediately after the IPO. Executives at both companies said that they would cooperate on "the development of electric vehicles, parts, and production system and engineering support." Less than two months later, Toyota and Tesla confirmed that their first platform collaboration would be to build an electric version of the RAV4 EV. In October 2014, both Daimler and Toyota sold their holdings of Tesla shares with a combined profit of over US$1 billion.

On June 29, 2010, Tesla Motors launched its initial public offering on NASDAQ. 13,300,000 shares of common stock were issued to the public at a price of US$17.00 per share. The IPO raised US$226 million for the company. It was the first American car maker to go public since the Ford Motor Company had its IPO in 1956, and by 2014 Tesla had market value half that of Ford. In early 2013, Tesla had problems producing the Model S, and was running out of money. Musk proposed a US$11 billion deal with Google, but improved production and a sales push gave Tesla its first profitable quarter, and the deal was abandoned.

During November 2013, following news of a third Model S fire, Tesla's stock fell more than 20 percent. All of those Model S fires had developed several minutes after the cars had struck significant road debris at high speeds and all of the vehicles had provided warnings to the occupants of serious battery damage, advising that an immediate stop was required. All three owners ordered new Model Ss. In the following months Tesla developed a battery protection system as a no-cost retrofit to all Model Ss. No further regulatory action was taken, although there have been a few incidents since, most recently January 2016, with a Model S charging at a Norwegian Supercharger station. Despite the drop in stock price, Tesla was still the top performer on the Nasdaq 100 index in 2013. Tesla was seeking to sell 40,000 electric vehicles worldwide in 2014, adding China, Hong Kong, Japan, and Australia to the list of countries where it exports cars, but in November 2014 Tesla reduced its guidance on sales down to 33,000 units for 2014. As of the 2014 model year, Tesla had a US Corporate Average Fuel Economy (CAFE) of 276.7 MPG.

Tesla's production of cars began at the Tesla Factory in Fremont, California. In October 2015, Tesla Motor announced the company was negotiating with the Chinese government on producing cars in China. Local production in China has the potential to reduce the sales prices of Tesla models by a third; however, foreign automakers are generally required to establish a joint venture with a Chinese company to produce cars domestically. Elon Musk clarified at that time that production will remain in the U.S. in the foreseeable future, but if there's sufficient local demand for the Tesla Model 3 in China, a factory could be built in the country as soon as a year after the launch of the new model. Production in Europe will also depend on the region's demand for the Model 3. Tesla was also considering building a manufacturing plant in India, according to Tesla's Chief Information Officer, Jay Vijayan. This would help Tesla to avoid 100% import duty which is applicable on import of CBU (Completely Built Unit) cars in India. Tesla was also considering building a battery plant in India. "Given high local demand, a Gigafactory in India would probably make sense in the long term," Musk said in response to a specific question about whether he would consider a factory in India too.

Tesla announced in November 2015 that during the third quarter of 2015 it produced a record 13,091 vehicles, and also revised its target sales for 2015 to between 50,000 and 52,000 vehicles, including both of its models available for retail sales. The company expects to achieve an average production and deliveries of 1,600 to 1,800 vehicles per week for Model S and Model X combined during 2016, adding up to 80,000 to 90,000 new Model S and Model X vehicles in 2016.

== Used vehicles ==
Under a buyback program called the Resale Value Guarantee available in 37 U.S. states, a Tesla Model S sold new before July 1, 2016, included the right to return it after three years with reimbursement of 43% to 50% of its initial price. This reimbursement matched the trade-in values of competitive German luxury cars of that age. In addition to maintaining the resale value, Tesla hoped to secure a supply of used cars to refurbish and re-sell with warranty. According to Automotive News, the profit margin on used car sales in the U.S. is about triple that on new cars, and Tesla's direct sales would allow them to capture resale profits.

In May 2015, Tesla started selling refurbished Model S cars in the U.S. and within a month sold 1,600 cars. As of July 2017, over 80 used Model S and Model X cars were for sale, with either a four-year, 50,000-mile warranty or a two-year, 100,000-mile warranty for vehicles above 50,000 miles. As of September 2015, similar programs existed in Canada, Austria, Belgium, Denmark, France, Germany, Britain, Netherlands, Norway, Sweden and Switzerland.

== Acquisitions ==
Date	Announced	Company	Business	Value (USD)	References
May 8, 2015	Yes	Riviera Tool LLC	Stamping die systems used to form sheet metal parts	Unknown	
Nov 8, 2016	Yes	Grohmann Engineering	Engineering automation systems	135 million	
Nov 21, 2016	Yes	SolarCity	Provides solar energy services	2.6 billion	
Nov 7, 2017	Yes	Perbix	Designs automated manufacturing equipment	10.5 million (All-stock)	
Dec 1, 2017	No	Compass Automation	Designs, develops and integrates custom automation systems that help optimize production.	Unknown	
May 16, 2019	Yes	Maxwell Technologies	Manufactures and markets energy storage and power delivery solutions for automobiles	218 million (All-stock)	
Oct 1, 2019	Yes	DeepScale	Develops perceptual system technologies for automated vehicles	Unknown	
Oct 2, 2019	No	Hibar Systems	Advanced automation solutions for small cell batteries through a mechanized pump injection system	Unknown	
Feb 1, 2020	No	SilLion Inc.	Specializes in anodes and electrodes for cylindrical batteries	Unknown	
Sep 25, 2020	No	German ATW Automation	Assembling battery modules and packs for the auto industry	Unknown	
Jul 31, 2023	No	Wiferion	Wireless charging systems for industrial vehicles and autonomous robots	Unknown	

In 2015, Tesla acquired Riviera Tool & Die (with 100 employees in Grand Rapids, Michigan), one of its suppliers of stamping items. They initially renamed the facility "Tesla Michigan", and subsequently refer to the facility as Tesla Tool and Die. In 2017, Tesla acquired Perbix Machine Company, a manufacturer of automated manufacturing equipment, that had been an equipment supplier for over three years. In December 2017, Tesla acquired the factory automation firm Compass Automation of Elgin, Illinois, with expertise in automated assembly and inspection systems; by the end of 2018 the company was working exclusively for Tesla.

=== SolarCity ===
On August 1, 2016, Tesla agreed to acquire SolarCity Corp. for US$2.6 billion in stock. SolarCity was then the largest installer of rooftop solar systems in the United States. More than 85% of unaffiliated Tesla and SolarCity shareholders voted to approve the acquisition, which closed on November 21, 2016.

After it acquired SolarCity, Tesla stopped using door to door sales tactics for solar systems; instead, it markets and sells its products at company showrooms. For a short time, Tesla partnered with Home Depot to sell solar and energy products through in store kiosks. At the time, it did not provide a leasing option for solar panels, and consumers had to purchase them.

== Model 3 rollout ==
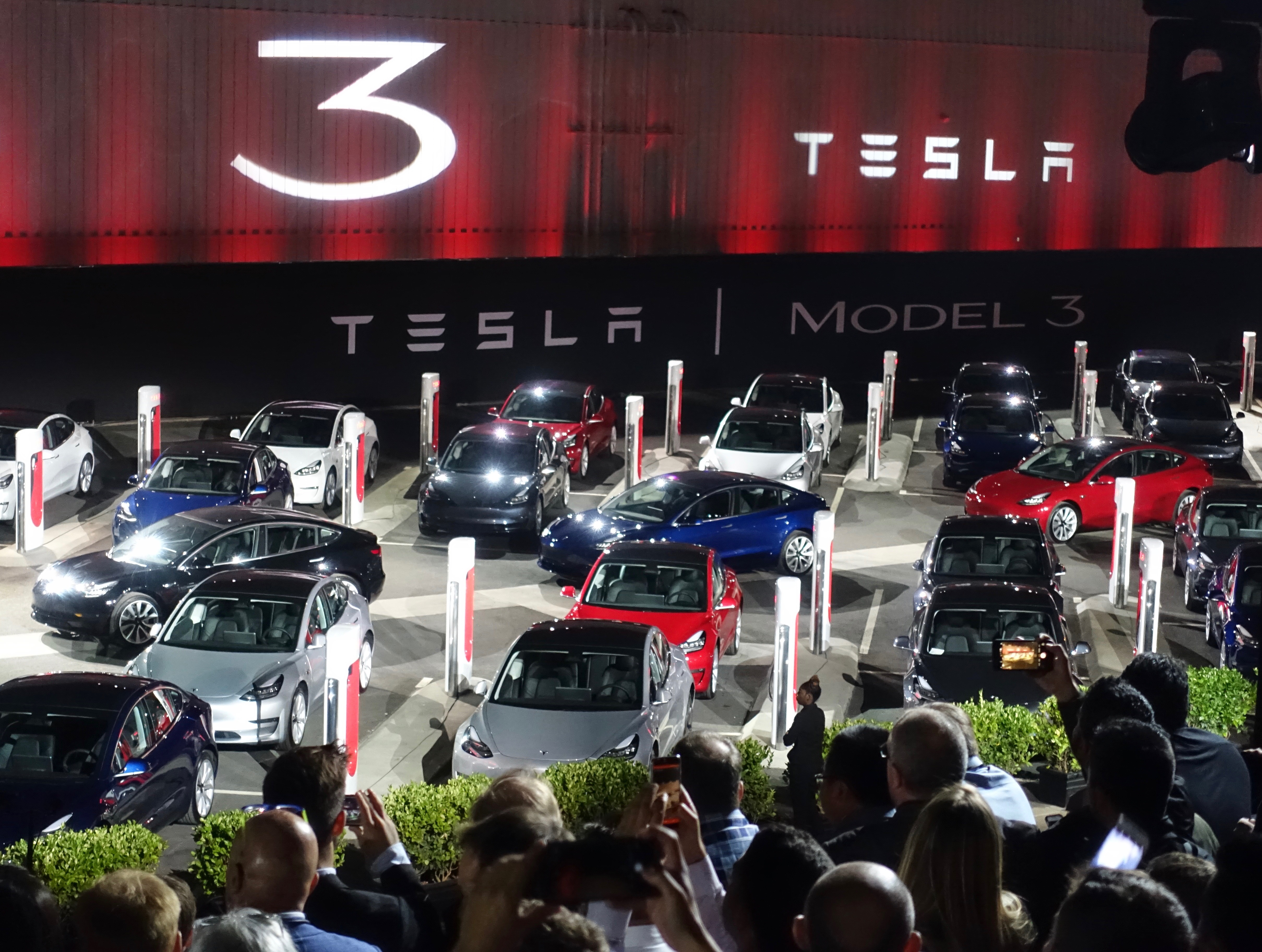
The Tesla Model 3 first deliveries event took place on July 28, 2017.

Model 3 was unveiled in March 2016. A week after the unveiling, global reservations totaled 325,000 units. As a result of the demand for Model 3, in May 2016, Tesla advanced its 500,000 annual unit build plan (for all models) by two years to 2018. This would in turn allow more Model 3 buyers to benefit from the full US$7,500 U.S. tax credit before the limit of 200,000 cars per maker since 2010 reduces the credit.

On February 1, 2017, the company changed its name from Tesla Motors to Tesla. In late March 2017, Tesla Inc. announced that Tencent Holdings Ltd., at the time China's "most valuable company," had purchased a 5% stake in Tesla for US$1.8 billion. In 2017, Tesla surpassed Ford Motor Company and General Motors in market capitalization for a couple of months, making it the most valuable American automaker. In June 2017, Tesla appeared for the first time in the Fortune 500 list.

In the week preceding the debut on July 7, 2017, of the Model 3 sedan, Tesla's stock-market value declined by more than US$12 billion from a previous value of US$63 billion. The loss was a result of a combination of factors that disappointed investors. Demand for Tesla's existing luxury models, Model S and Model X, did not grow in the second quarter. Brian Johnson of Barclays said that customer deposits for the Model S and Model X fell by US$50 million, potentially indicating that Tesla's introduction of the Model 3 could be adversely affecting their sales. Tesla predicted that luxury sales would reach 100,000 per year, below some analysts' expectations.

Investors expressed concern about Tesla's plans for execution and its competitive risk, as Volvo Cars committed to introduce only electric and electric-assisted vehicles by 2019. Johnson claimed that "Tesla will face intense competition by the next decade."

Morningstar analyst David Whiston foresaw a revised, slower timetable for the Model 3 and a company acknowledgement of problems with building battery packs for its cars. In 2016 Musk predicted 100,000 Model 3 units would be sold in 2017, but that production may reach only 20,000 by December. Axel Schmidt, a managing director at consulting firm Accenture, said that Tesla's problems with Gigafactory 1 prove that increasing Model 3 production "remains a huge challenge". In October 2017, Tesla reported delivery of 220 Model 3 cars, acknowledging this was "less than anticipated due to production bottlenecks".

In early November 2017, Musk advised investors of a production delay that was primarily due to difficulties with the new battery that would allow Tesla to significantly reduce the manufacturing cost of the Model 3. The company was having difficulties with robots on the assembly line, but the most serious issue was with one of the four zones in the battery manufacturing, caused by a "systems integration subcontractor", according to Musk. "We had to rewrite all of the software from scratch for the battery module", he reported. He assured investors that Tesla had "reallocated" top engineers to work on achieving a solution. By that time, Jon Wagner, director of battery engineering, had left the company. Also in November, Musk postponed the target date for manufacturing 5000 of the vehicles per week from December 2017 to "sometime in March" 2018; about which an analyst with Cowan and Company commented that "Elon Musk needs to stop over promising and under delivering". On November 21, 2017, Bloomberg stated that "over the past 12 months, the electric-car maker has been burning money at a clip of about $8,000 a minute (or $480,000 an hour)" preparing for Model 3.

In April 2018, Musk increased the 5000 per week number by 20%, forecasting Tesla could achieve 6,000 units per week by the end of June 2018. When asked when the company would reach a production level of 10,000 units per week, he declined to speculate.

Tesla sold around 140,000 Model 3 vehicles worldwide in 2018.

In 2016, BYD Auto was the world's top selling plug-in car manufacturer with 101,183 units sold, followed by Tesla with 76,243. However, Tesla revenues ranked first with $6.35 billion, while BYD notched $3.88 billion. Also in 2016, Tesla sold $1 billion worth of cars in China, the world's largest market for electric vehicles. In October of the following year it reached an agreement with the Chinese government to build a factory in Shanghai.

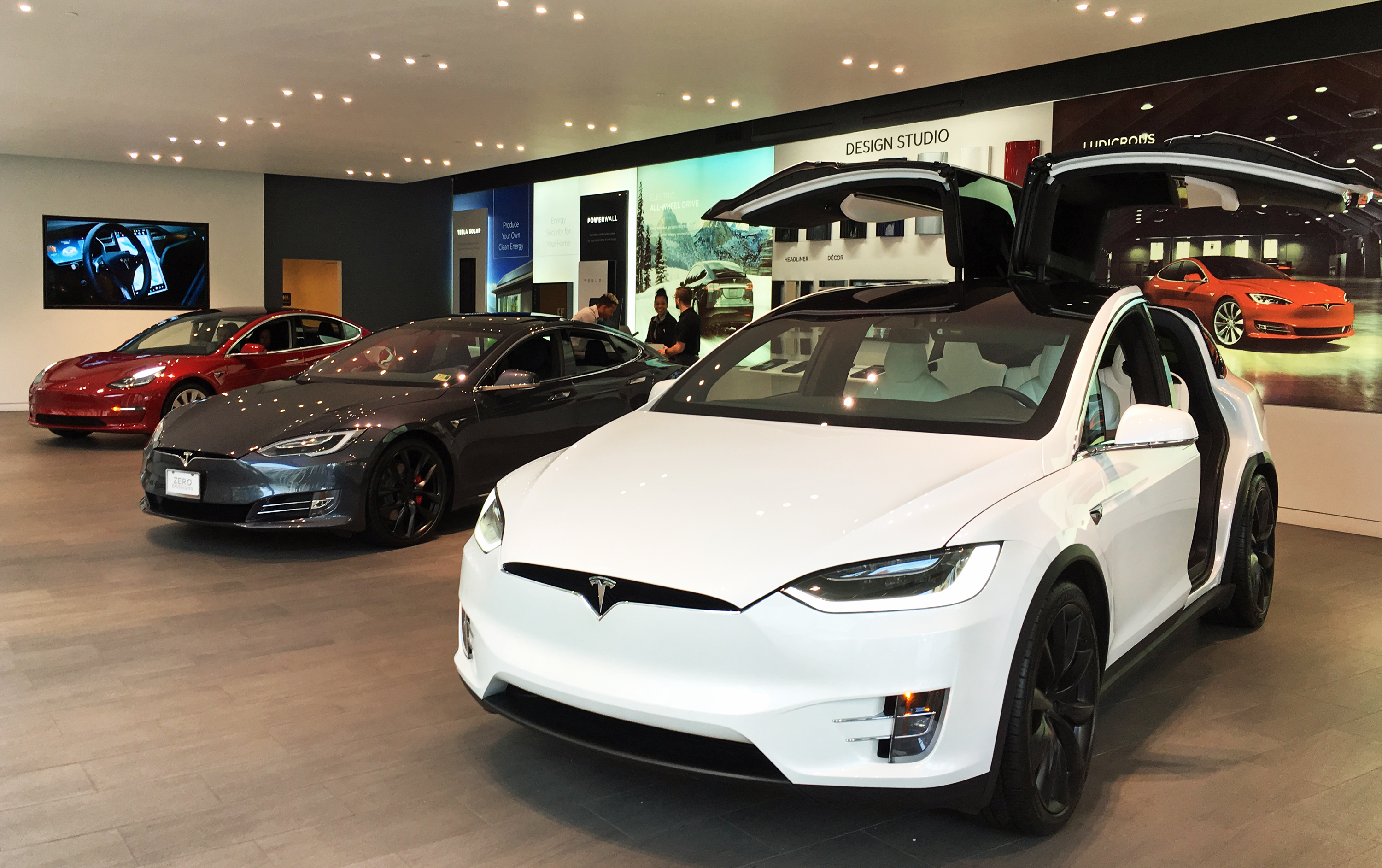
Tesla listed as the world's best selling plug-in passenger car manufacturer in 2018 and 2019. Shown is Tesla's entire vehicle line up (from back to front, the Model 3, Model S and Model X) as of 2019.

After ranking third by brand in 2017, behind BYD and BAIC, Tesla ranked as the world's best selling plug-in passenger car manufacturer in 2018, both as a brand and by automotive group, with 245,240 units delivered, capturing a market share of 12% of all plug-in cars sold globally in 2018, followed by BYD Auto with 227,152 plug-in passenger cars delivered.

In August 2015, Tesla launched a revamp of its stores to include interactive displays focused on safety, autopilot, charging network and motors. As of October 2016, Tesla operated about 260 galleries or retail locations in the United States. In June 2016, Tesla opened its first store-within-a-store: a small outpost within the Nordstrom department store at The Grove shopping mall in Los Angeles. In 2017, Tesla opened retail locations in Dubai and South Korea.

Foreseeing Germany as its second market after the U.S. (and the largest in Europe), in 2016 Tesla stated the Netherlands Vehicle Authority-issued Whole Vehicle Type Approval (WVTA) should be accepted as a legal compliance document, with no need to seek specific national type of approvals in EU member states. In 2017, Tesla had a $52 million marketing budget and used a referral program and word of mouth to attract buyers.

== 2018 consideration of taking Tesla private ==
In a tweet on August 7, 2018, Elon Musk said: "Am considering taking Tesla private at $420. Funding secured." On Tesla's blog Musk elaborated that Tesla's status as a public company subjects it to the quarterly earnings cycle that puts enormous pressure on the company to make decisions that may be right for a given quarter, but not necessarily right for the company's long-term growth. Additionally, as the most shorted stock in the history of the stock market, being a publicly traded company means that there are large numbers of investors who may have the incentive to attack the company. Musk released a considerably more detailed statement on the Tesla Blog the following week indicating that the proposal was by him in his personal capacity, and not as CEO of Tesla. Furthermore, he indicated that he had high confidence in the funding being secured based on discussions with the managing director of the Saudi sovereign wealth fund who had requested Musk consider taking Tesla private and indicated strong capital support for doing so. On August 24, Musk released a statement indicating that both he and the Tesla Board of Directors had made the decision for the company to remain public. In September 2018, Musk was sued by the U.S. Securities and Exchange Commission for the tweet claiming that funding had been secured for taking Tesla private. The lawsuit characterized the tweet as false, misleading, and damaging to investors, and sought to bar Musk from being CEO for publicly traded companies. Musk settled with the SEC two days later. The settlement terms required Musk to step down as chairman, and prohibited him from running for chairman again for three years. Additionally, he and Tesla Inc. were fined US$20M each to reimburse investors who were harmed by Musk's tweet.

== Financials ==
Tesla has financed operations (production, development, administration, etc.) by sales income, stock offering and bond sales. In May 2013 Tesla raised US$1.02 billion (US$660 million from bonds) partially to repay the Department of Energy loans received from the ATVM loan program after their first profitable quarter. In February 2014 Tesla raised US$2 billion from bonds to build the first GigaFactory. In August 2015, Tesla raised US$738 million in stock to build the Model X. In May 2016, Tesla raised US$1.46 billion in stock to build the Model 3. By 2016, Tesla had raised over US$4.5 billion since its IPO in 2010.

Tesla entered the Interbrand Top100 Best Global Brands in 2016 in position 100 with a brand valuation of US$4 billion. In 2020, Kantar rated Tesla's brand as worth US$11.35 billion, behind Toyota, Mercedes and BMW, but ahead of all other auto makers, and the only automotive brand whose value increased since the previous year.

On October 26, 2016, Tesla posted a profitable quarter, their first in 8 quarters, defying industry expectations.

According to the Wall Street Journal, in September 2018, the company's stock fell to its lowest price in a year, around the time that CEO Elon Musk smoked marijuana during a live TV interview.

As of December 31, 2019, Musk owns 38,658,670 Tesla shares or 20.8% of the company.

On January 10, 2020, Tesla become the most valuable American automaker to ever exist, with a market capitalization of US$86 billion. On July 1, 2020, Tesla reached a market capitalization of US$206 billion, surpassing Toyota's US$202 billion to become the world's largest automaker by market capitalization.

Tesla issued US$2 billion of new shares on February 18, 2020.

From July 2019 to June 2020, Tesla recorded four profitable quarters in a row for the first time, which made it eligible for inclusion in the S&P 500.

On August 12, 2020, Tesla announced a 5-for-1 stock split, which took effect on August 31, 2020.

== Timeline of production and sales ==
Tesla's global sales passed 250,000 units in September 2017, and its 300,000th vehicle was produced in February 2018. Tesla's global sales achieved the 500,000 unit milestone in December 2018. Tesla's global vehicle sales increased 50% from 245,240 units in 2018 to 367,849 units in 2019. On March 9, 2020, the company produced its 1 millionth electric car. In September 2021, Tesla sold its 2 millionth electric car, becoming the first auto manufacturer to achieve such a milestone. At the end of 2021, Tesla's global sales since 2012 totaled over 2.3 million units.

- Model S
- Model X
- Model S/X
- Models Other Than 3/Y
- Model 3
- Model 3/Y

Quarter	Cumulative production	Total production	Roadster sales (Note: Deliveries for the Roadster began February 2008. At the end of 2012 Tesla sold a total of 2,450 Roadsters.)	Model S sales	Model X sales	Model 3 sales	Model Y sales (Note: Model Y started production in January 2020 and started shipping in March 2020. Tesla is reporting sales of Model 3 and Model Y as combined sales, starting with 2020-Q1.)	Total sales (Note: Sales are only counted as sold when delivered to end customer and all paperwork is correct)	In transit (Note: Goods in transit are produced but not counted as sold until delivered. Tesla no longer reports in transit numbers.)	Source
Q1 2011	N/A	N/A	145					145		
Q2 2011	N/A	N/A	190					190		
Q3 2011	N/A	N/A	184					184		
Q4 2011	N/A	N/A	150					150		
Q1 2012	N/A	N/A	99					99		
Q2 2012	N/A	50	89	29				118		
Q3 2012	N/A	350+	68	253				321		
Q4 2012	N/A	2,750+	32	2,400				2,432		
Q1 2013	N/A	5,000+		4,900				4,900		
Q2 2013	N/A	N/A		5,150				5,150		
Q3 2013	N/A	N/A		5,500+				5,500+		
Q4 2013	~34,851	6,587		6,892				6,892		
Q1 2014	~41,438	7,535		6,457				6,457		
Q2 2014	~48,973	8,763		7,579				7,579		
Q3 2014	~57,736	~7,075		7,785				7,785		
Q4 2014	64,811	11,627		9,834				9,834		
Q1 2015	76,438	11,160		10,045				10,045		
Q2 2015	89,245	12,807		11,532				11,532		
Q3 2015	102,336	13,091		11,597	6			11,603		
Q4 2015	116,373	14,037		17,272	206			17,478		
Q1 2016	131,883	15,510		12,420	2,400			14,820	2,615	
Q2 2016	150,228	18,345		9,764	4,638			14,402	5,150	
Q3 2016	175,413	25,185		16,047	8,774			24,821	5,065	
Q4 2016 (Note: Sales by model do not add up to total, these were preliminary figures reported by Tesla. Only total sales is final figures are reported by Tesla, as breakdown by model is not typically provided.)	200,295	24,882		12,700	9,500			22,254	6,450	
Q1 2017	225,713	25,418		~13,450	~11,550			25,051	~4,650	
Q2 2017	251,421	25,708		~12,000	~10,000			22,026	~3,500	
Q3 2017	276,757	25,336		14,065	11,865	222		26,137	4,820	
Q4 2017	301,322	24,565		~15,200	~13,120	1,542		29,967	3,380	
Q1 2018	335,816	34,494		11,730	10,070	8,182		29,997	6,100	
Q2 2018	389,155	53,339		10,930	11,370	18,440		40,740	15,058	
Q3 2018	469,297	80,142		14,470	13,190	56,065		83,725	11,824	
Q4 2018	555,852	86,555		13,500	14,050	63,359		90,700	2,907	
Q1 2019	632,952	77,100		12,100		50,900		63,000	10,600	
Q2 2019	720,000	87,048		17,650		77,550		95,200	7,400	
Q3 2019	816,155	96,155		17,483		79,703		97,186		
Q4 2019	921,046	104,891		19,475		92,620		112,095		
Q1 2020	1,023,718	102,672		12,230		76,266		88,496		
Q2 2020	1,105,990	82,272		10,614		80,277		90,891		
Q3 2020	1,251,026	145,036		15,275		124,318		139,593		
Q4 2020	1,430,783	179,757		18,966		161,701		180,667		
Q1 2021	1,611,121	180,338		2,030 (Note: Production of Model S and X was suspended during Q1 2021 to prepare for production of refreshed models later in the year.)		182,847		184,877		
Q2 2021	1,817,542	206,421		1,895		199,409		201,304		
Q3 2021	2,055,365	237,823		9,289		232,102		241,391		
Q4 2021	2,361,205	305,840		11,766		296,884		308,650		
Q1 2022	2,666,612	305,407		14,724		295,324		310,048		
Q2 2022	2,925,192	258,580 (Note: Giga Shanghai faced severe production slowdowns in April and May due to strict COVID-19 lockdown.)		16,162		238,533		254,695		
Q3 2022	3,291,115	365,923		18,672		325,158		343,830		
Q4 2022	3,730,816	439,701		17,147		388,131		405,278		
Q1 2023	4,171,624	440,808		10,695		412,180		422,875		
Q2 2023	4,651,324	479,700		19,225		446,915		466,140		
Q3 2023	5,081,812	430,488		15,985		419,074		435,059		
Q4 2023	5,576,801	494,989		22,969 (Note: Q4 2023 onwards this column also include Cybertruck sales.)		461,538		484,507		
Q1 2024	6,010,172	433,371		17,027		369,783		386,810		
Q2 2024	6,421,003	410,831		21,551		422,405		443,956		
Q3 2024	6,890,799	469,796		22,915		439,975		462,890		
Q4 2024	7,349,622	459,445		23,640		471,930		495,570		
Q1 2025	7,712,237	362,615		12,881		323,800		336,681		
Q2 2025	8,122,481	410,244		10,394		373,728		384,122		
Q3 2025	8,569,931	447,450		15,933		481,166		497,099		
Q4 2025	9,004,289	434,358		11,642		406,585		418,227		
Q1 2026	9,412,675	408,386		16,130		341,893		358,023		
Q2 2026	9,864,433	451,758		12,364		467,762		480,126		
Q3 2026	10,328,824	464,391		8,295		478,237		486,532		

Tesla deliveries vary significantly by month due to regional issues such as car carrier availability and registration. Tesla does not follow the former auto industry standard of monthly reporting; GM and Ford changed from monthly to quarterly sales reporting in 2018 and 2019. Some monthly sales are estimated by media.
