= Tarpenning =

Tarpenning is a surname. Notable people with the surname include:

- Kory Tarpenning (born 1962), American pole vaulter
- Marc Tarpenning (born 1964), American engineer and entrepreneur
