= Tesla Roadster (first generation) =

Electric convertible sports car (2008–2012)

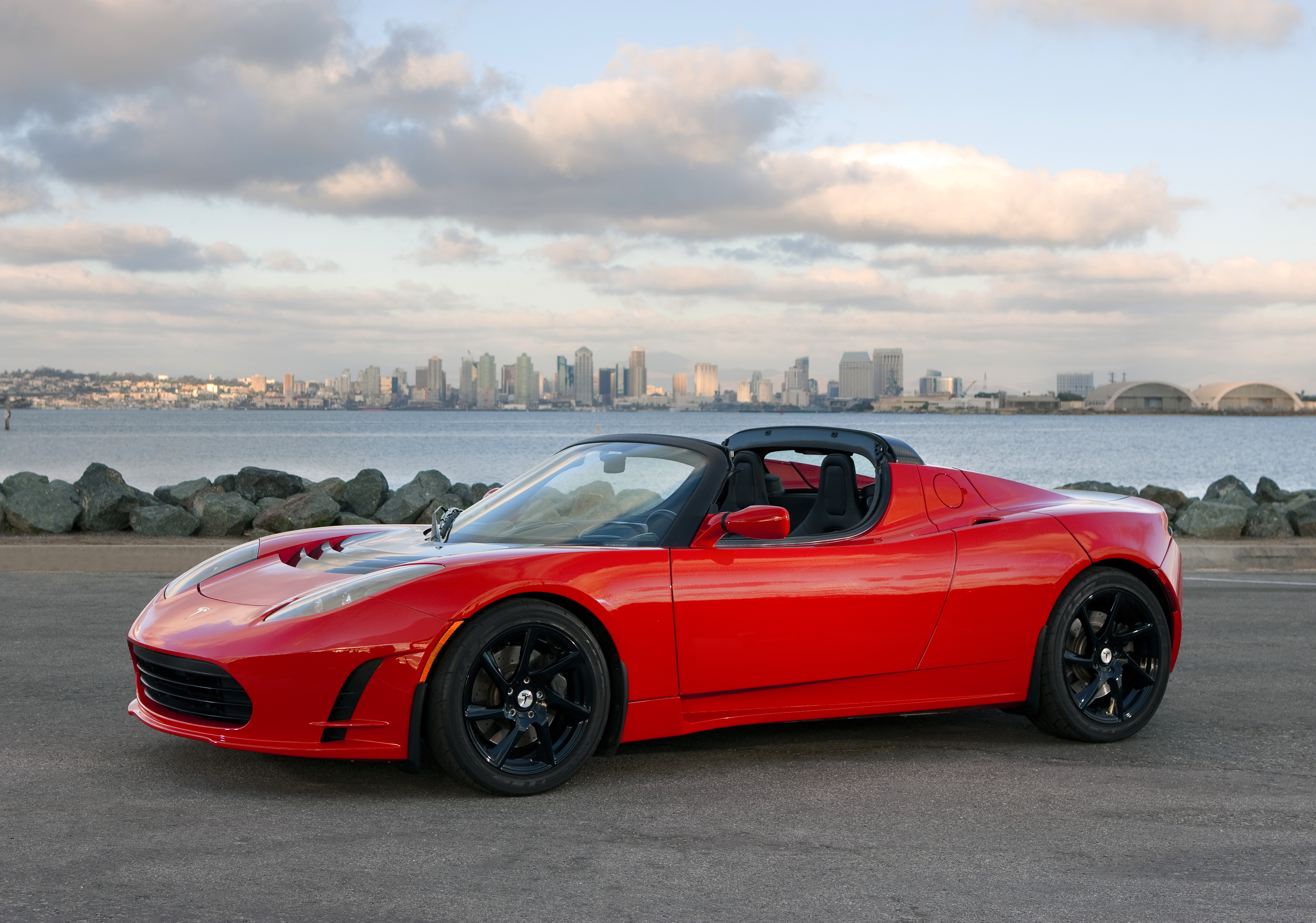
- Tesla Roadster

Overview
- Manufacturer: Tesla Motors
- Also called: DarkStar (code name)
- Production: 2008–2012
- Assembly: England: Hethel (Lotus: chassis); United States: Menlo Park, California (final assembly)

Body and chassis
- Class: Two-seater/sports car (S)
- Body style: 2-door roadster
- Layout: Rear mid-motor, rear-wheel drive
- Related: Lotus Elise; Opel Speedster

Powertrain
- Electric motor: 3-phase 4-pole AC induction motor: 1.5: 248 hp (185 kW), 200 lb⋅ft (270 N⋅m); 2.0, 2.5: 288 hp (215 kW), 280 lb⋅ft (380 N⋅m); 2.5 Sport: 288 hp (215 kW), 295 lb⋅ft (400 N⋅m)
- Transmission: 1-speed BorgWarner (8.27:1 ratio)
- Battery: 53 kWh lithium-ion
- Electric range: 244 mi (393 km) (EPA)
- Plug-in charging: 16.8 kW 110–240 V onboard charger for 1Φ 70 A using proprietary connector

Dimensions
- Wheelbase: 92.6 in (2,352 mm)
- Length: 155.4 in (3,946 mm)
- Width: 73.7 in (1,873 mm)
- Height: 44.4 in (1,127 mm)
- Curb weight: 2,877 lb (1,305 kg)

Chronology
- Successor: Tesla Roadster (second generation)

The first generation Tesla Roadster is a battery electric sports car based on the Lotus Elise chassis, and was produced by Tesla Motors (now Tesla, Inc.) from 2008 to 2012. The Roadster was the first highway legal, serial production, all-electric car to use lithium-ion battery cells, and the first production all-electric car with a range of more than 200 miles (320 km) per charge.

Tesla sold about 2,450 Roadsters in over 30 countries, and most of the last Roadsters were sold in Europe and Asia during the fourth quarter of 2012. Tesla produced right-hand-drive Roadsters from early 2010. The Roadster qualified for government incentives in several nations.

According to the U.S. EPA, the Roadster can travel 244 miles (393 km) on a single charge of its lithium-ion battery pack. The vehicle can accelerate from 0 to 60 mph (0 to 97 km/h) in 3.7 or 3.9 seconds depending on the model. It has a top speed of 125 mph (201 km/h). The Roadster's efficiency, as of September 2008, was reported as 120 miles per gallon gasoline equivalent (28 kW⋅h/100 mi) (2.0 L/100 km). It uses 21.7 kWh/100 mi (135 Wh/km) battery-to-wheel, and has an efficiency of 88% on average.

== History ==
Prototypes of the car were officially revealed to the public on July 19, 2006, in Santa Monica, California, at a 350-person invitation-only event held in Barker Hangar at Santa Monica Airport. It was featured in Time in December 2006 as the recipient of the magazine's "Best Inventions 2006—Transportation Invention" award.

The first Tesla Roadster was delivered in February 2008 to Tesla early investor, chairman and product architect Elon Musk. The company produced 500 similar vehicles through June 2009. In July 2009, Tesla began production of its 2010 model-year Roadster—the first major product upgrade. Simultaneously, Tesla began producing the Roadster Sport, the first derivative of Tesla's proprietary, patented powertrain. The car accelerates from 0 to 60 mph (0 to 97 km/h) in 3.7 seconds, compared to 3.9 seconds for the standard Roadster.

Changes for the 2010 model-year cars included:

- An upgraded interior and push-button gear selector, including "executive interior" of exposed carbon fiber and premium leather, and clear-coat carbon fiber body accents.
- Locking, push-button glove box wrapped in leather.
- A centrally mounted video display screen to monitor real-time data, including estimated range, power regenerated, and the number of barrels of oil saved.
- Manually adjustable shock absorber response and anti-sway bars.
- More powerful and immediate heating, ventilation and air-conditioning.
- More efficient motor and hand-wound stator delivering higher peak power.
- Sound-deadening measures to reduce noise, vibration and harshness.

All of these features, except for the motor, were available either as standard or as add-on option for the non-sport model.

Beginning mid-March 2010, Tesla, in an effort to show off the practicality of its electric cars, sent one of its Roadsters around the world. Starting at the Geneva International Motor Show, the Roadster completed its journey upon its arrival in Paris on September 28, 2010.

In July 2010, Tesla introduced the "Roadster 2.5" update including:

- New front fascia with diffusing vents and rear diffuser
- Directional forged wheels available in both silver and black
- New seats with larger more supportive bolsters and a new lumbar support system
- Power control hardware that enables better performance in exceptionally hot climates
- An optional 7-inch touchscreen display with back-up camera
- Improved interior sound reduction including new front fender liner material

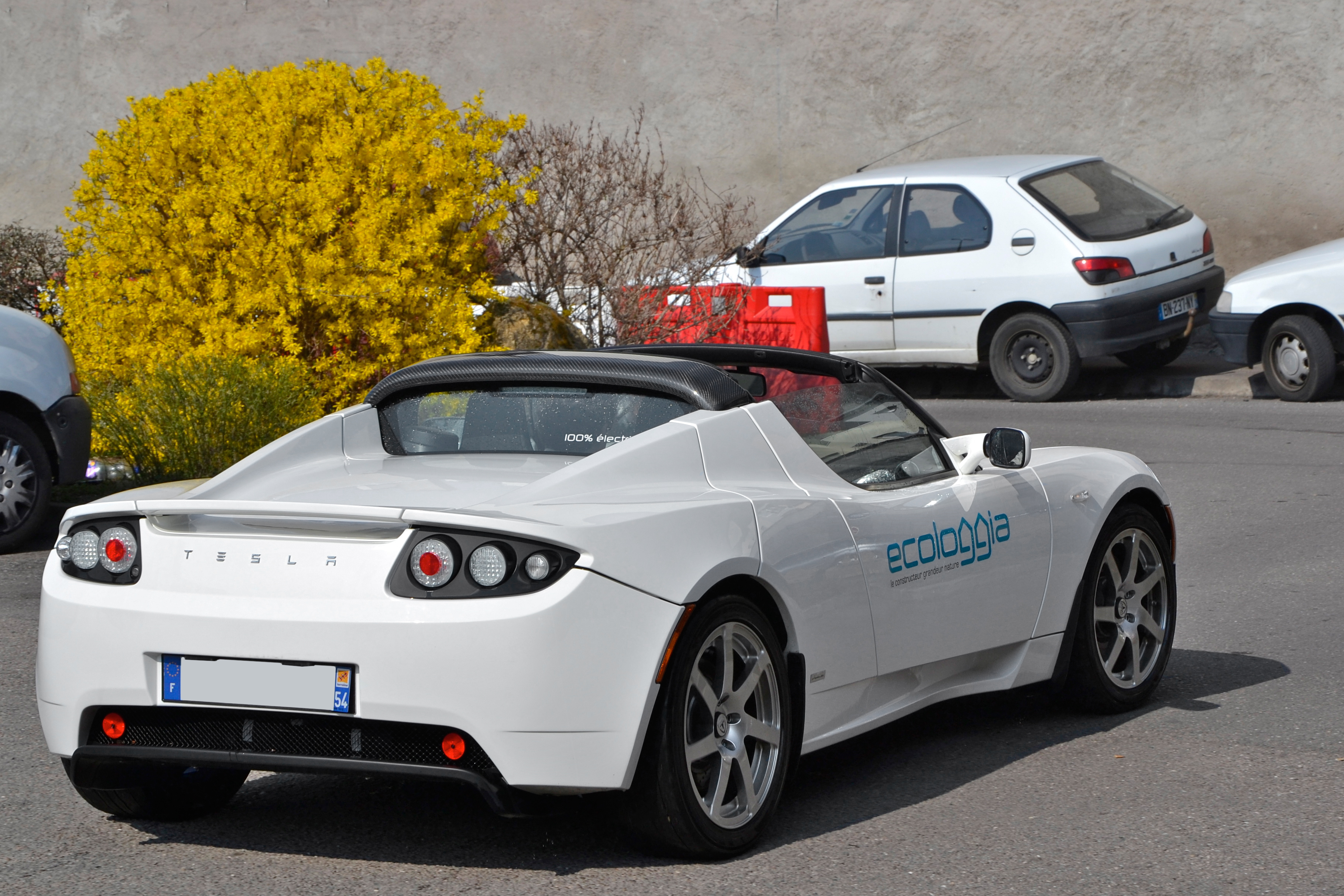
Tesla Roadster (France)

Tesla produced the Roadster until January 2012, when its supply of gliders ran out, as its contract with Lotus Cars for 2,500 gliders expired at the end of 2011. Tesla stopped taking orders for the Roadster in the U.S. market in August 2011. Featuring new options and enhanced components, the 2012 Tesla Roadster was sold in limited numbers only in Europe, Asia, and Australia. Tesla's U.S. exemption for not having advanced (two-stage) passenger airbags expired for cars made after the end of 2011 so the last Roadsters could not be sold in the American market. Fifteen Final Edition Roadsters were produced to close the manufacturing cycle of Tesla's first electric car.

For a time, Tesla offered an optional upgrade to existing Roadsters, the Roadster 3.0. It offered a new battery pack with cells from LG Chem increasing capacity by 31% to 70 kWh, a new aero kit designed to reduce drag, and new tires with lower rolling resistance. The upgrade was offered between September 2015 and late 2016 at a cost of US$29,000 (equivalent to $38,904 in 2025).

In November 2023, Tesla open-sourced some of the Roadster's design and engineering documents, as well as diagnostic software.

== Development ==
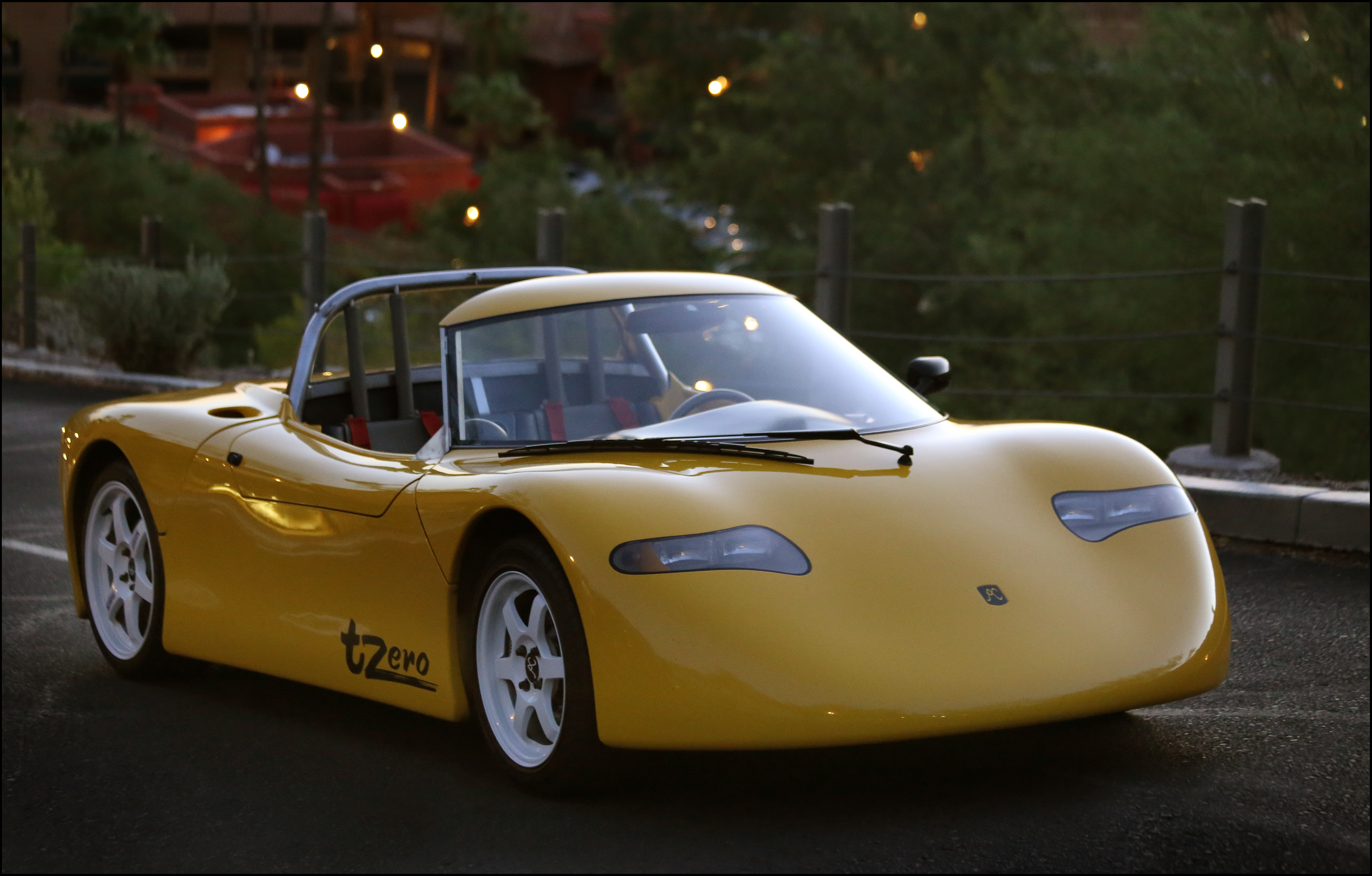
The tzero concept EV that inspired Tesla's founders

After Martin Eberhard sold NuvoMedia to TV Guide, he wanted a sports car, but could not find one to his liking. His battery experience with the Rocket eBook inspired him to develop an electric car.

During his search, Eberhard test drove the tzero, a concept car from the small automaker AC Propulsion. Eberhard and Marc Tarpenning, who had also driven the tzero, tried to convince the company to put the car into production, but when they declined, they decided to establish Tesla Motors in Delaware on July 1, 2003, to pursue the idea commercially. South African-born entrepreneur Elon Musk would also test drive a tzero and encouraged AC Propulsion to put the car into production, instead the company connected Musk with Eberhard and Tarpenning. Musk took an active role within the company starting in 2004, including investing US$7.5 million (~$12.2 million in 2025), overseeing Roadster product design from the beginning, and greatly expanding Tesla's long-term strategic sales goals by using the sports car to fund the development of mainstream vehicles. Musk became Tesla's chairman of the board in April 2004. J. B. Straubel joined the company as a principal engineer in March 2004 and became the chief technology officer in May 2005. Musk received the Global Green 2006 product design award for the design of the Tesla Roadster, presented by Mikhail Gorbachev, and he received the 2007 Index Design award for the design of the Tesla Roadster.

Before Tesla had developed the Roadster's proprietary powertrain, they borrowed a tzero for use as a development mule and converted the vehicle from lead–acid AGM batteries to lithium-ion cells, which substantially increased the range, reduced weight, and boosted 0 to 60 mph performance. Tesla licensed AC Propulsion's EV power system design and reductive charging patent, which covers integration of the charging electronics with the inverter, thus reducing mass, complexity, and cost. Tesla, however, was dissatisfied with how the motor and transmission worked in the chassis. Tesla then designed and built its own power electronics, motor, and other drivetrain components that incorporated this licensed technology from AC Propulsion. Given the extensive redevelopment of the vehicle, Tesla Motors no longer licenses any proprietary technology from AC Propulsion. The Roadster's powertrain is unique.

External images
- Tesla Roadster and Lotus Elise
- Black Roadster and grey Elise

On July 11, 2005, Tesla and British sports car maker Lotus entered an agreement about products and services based on the Lotus Elise, where Lotus provided advice on designing and developing a vehicle as well as producing partly assembled vehicles, and amended in 2009, helped with basic chassis development. The Roadster has a parts overlap of roughly 6% with the Lotus Elise, a 2-inch-longer wheelbase, and a slightly stiffer chassis according to Eberhard. Tesla's designers chose to construct the body panels using resin transfer molded carbon fiber composite to minimize weight; this choice makes the Roadster one of the least expensive cars with an entirely carbon fiber skin.

Several prototypes of the Tesla Roadster were produced from 2004 through 2007. Initial studies were done in two development mule vehicles based on Lotus Elises equipped with all-electric drive systems. Tesla then built and tested ten engineering prototypes (EP1 through EP10) in late 2006 and early 2007, which led to many minor changes. Next, Tesla produced at least 26 validation prototypes, which were delivered beginning in March 2007.

In August 2007, Martin Eberhard was replaced by an interim CEO, Michael Marks. Marks accepted the temporary position while a recruitment was undertaken. In December 2007, Ze'ev Drori became the CEO and president of Tesla. In October 2008, Musk succeeded Drori as CEO. Drori left the company in December. In January 2008, the U.S. National Highway Traffic Safety Administration (NHTSA) announced that it would grant Tesla a waiver of the advanced (two-stage) air bag rule noting that the Roadster includes standard air bags. Similar waivers were granted to other small volume manufacturers, including Lotus, Ferrari, and Bugatti. Tesla delivered its first production car in February 2008 to Musk.

Tesla announced in early August 2009 that Roadster sales had resulted in overall corporate profitability for the month of July 2009, earning US$1 million on revenue of US$20 million.

Tesla, which signed a production contract with Lotus in 2007 to produce "gliders" (complete cars minus electric powertrain) for the Roadster, announced in early 2010 that Roadster production would continue until early 2012. Starting one year prior to the end of the contract, no changes to the order was allowed to give time for tooling changes at Lotus's assembly plant in the UK.

Several years later in 2018, Musk would go on to say that using the Lotus Elise as a base for the Roadster was a poor strategy because the Elise was incompatible with the intended AC Propulsion technology and was modified so extensively only 7% of the Elise remained in common with the final production Roadster.

== Production ==
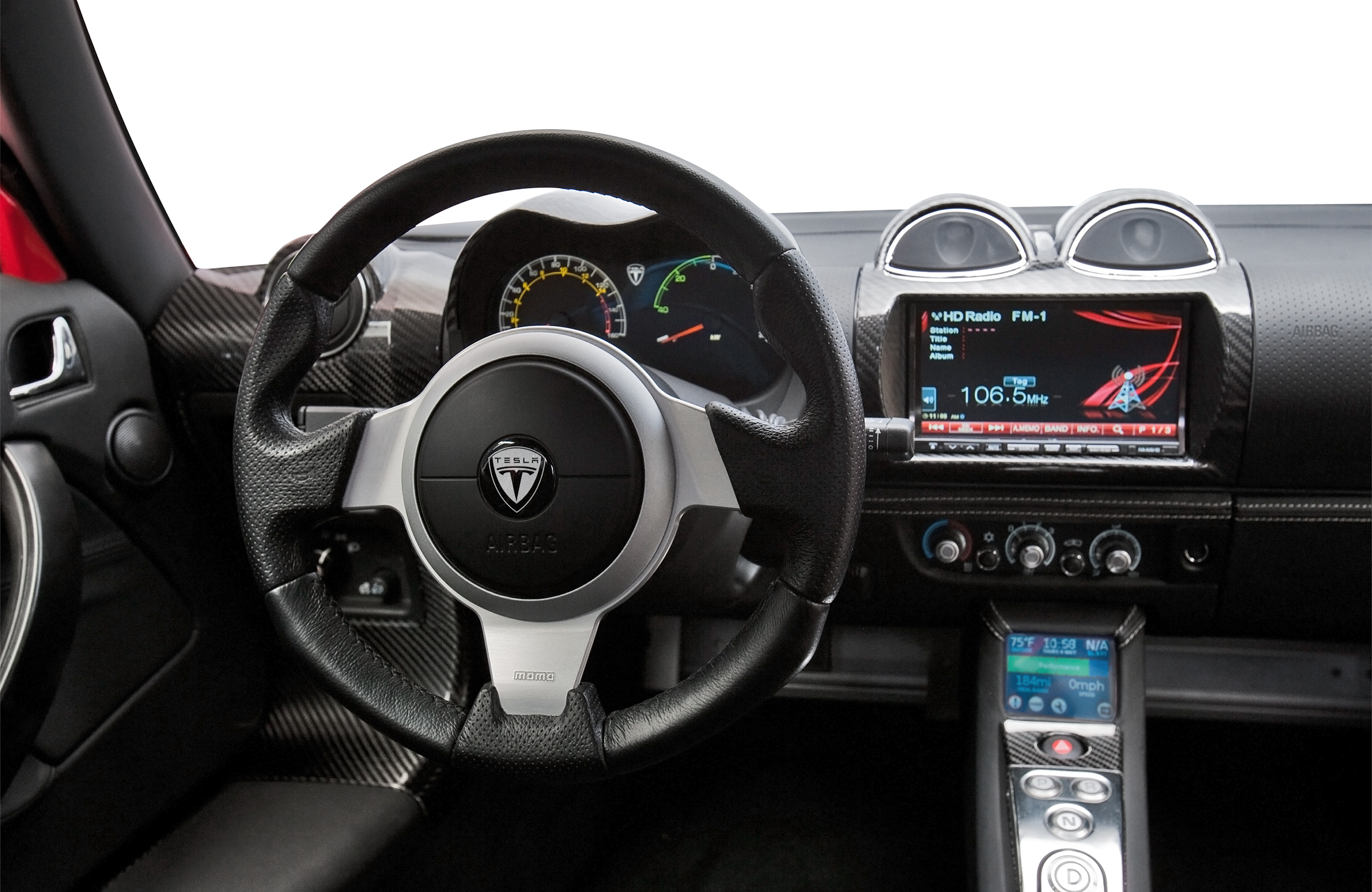
Interior of Roadster 2.5 from July 2010

Tesla's cumulative production of the Roadster reached 1,000 cars in January 2010. The Roadster is considered an American car though many carry a Vehicle Identification Number beginning with the letter "S", which is the designation for the United Kingdom. Some, however, carry a number starting with "5" appropriate to the US. Parts were sourced from around the world. The body panels came from French supplier Sotira. These were sent from France to Hethel, U.K., where Tesla contracted with Lotus to build the Roadster's unique chassis. The Roadster shares roughly 7% of its components with the Lotus Elise including the windshield, airbags, some dashboard parts, and suspension components. The Roadster's single-speed gearbox was made in Detroit by BorgWarner. Brakes and airbags were made by Siemens in Germany, and some crash testing was conducted at Siemens as well. 30–40% of components were sourced from Taiwan.

For Roadsters bound for customers in North America, the glider was sent to Tesla's facility in Menlo Park, California for final assembly, and for Roadsters bound for customers in Europe or elsewhere outside of North America, the glider was sent to a facility at Wymondham near Hethel for final assembly. At these locations, Tesla employees installed the powertrain, which consisted of the battery pack, power electronics module, gearbox and motor.

Tesla ordered 2,500 gliders from Lotus, which ceased production in December 2011 when their contract expired. Tesla ended production of the Roadster in January 2012.

=== Timeline ===
Subsequent to completion of the first production car, the company announced problems with transmission reliability. The development transmission, with first gear enabled to accelerate 0 to 60 mph (0 to 97 km/h) in 4 seconds, was reported to have a life expectancy of as low as only a few thousand miles. Tesla's first two transmission suppliers were unable to produce transmissions, in quantity, that could withstand the gear-shift requirements of the high torque, high rpm electric motor. In December 2007, Tesla announced plans to ship the initial Roadsters with the transmissions locked into second gear, providing 0 to 60 mph (0 to 97 km/h) acceleration in 5.7 seconds and allowing customers to swap out transmissions under warranty when the finalized transmission, power electronics module (PEM), and cooling system became available. The EPA range of the car was also restated downward from 245 to 221 mi (394 to 356 km). The downward revision was attributed to an error in equipment calibration at the laboratory that conducted the original test.

- During the first two months of production, Tesla produced a total of three Roadsters (P3/VINF002, P4/VINF004, and P5/VINF005). Production car # 1 (P1) and P2 were built prior to the start of regular series production, which began March 17, 2008.
- By September 10, 2008, Tesla had delivered 27 of the cars to customers. It was also reported that a newer, better transmission had been developed and that production of the car was hoped to reach 20 per week by December 2008, and 40 per week by March 2009. Over the next 20 days, however, only three more cars had been delivered to customers, which brought the total to 30 as of September 30, 2008.
- By November 19, 2008, more than 70 of the cars had been delivered to customers.
- By December 9, 2008, the 100th car had been delivered.
- By February 11, 2009, 200 Roadsters had been produced.
- By April 2, 2009, 320 Roadsters had been delivered.
- In May 2009, Tesla issued a safety recall for all 345 of its Roadsters that were manufactured before April 22, 2009. Tesla sent technicians to customers' homes to tighten the rear, inner hub flange bolts. The problem originated at the Lotus assembly line and Lotus also recalled some of its own vehicles.
- By the end of May 2009, the 500th Roadster had been delivered.
- Tesla made its first profit ever in July 2009, when it shipped 109 vehicles, the most in a single month at that time.
- By September 15, 2009, 700 Roadsters had been delivered.
- Tesla announced on January 13, 2010, that it had produced its 1,000th Roadster. The company had delivered vehicles to customers in 43 states and 21 countries worldwide.
- In January 2010, Tesla began producing its first right-hand-drive Roadsters for the UK and Ireland. The 2010 model-year right-hand-drive Roadster included a suite of unique noise-reduction materials and an upgraded sound system. The Roadster started at £86,950 and cost about 1.5p per mile.
- On January 29, 2010, in a Form S-1 filing of its preliminary prospectus with the U.S. Securities and Exchange Commission, the company stated that it would halt production of the Roadster in 2011 and replace it with a new model that would not be introduced until 2013 at the earliest: "...we do not plan to sell our current generation Tesla Roadster after 2011 due to planned tooling changes at a supplier for the Tesla Roadster, and we do not currently plan to begin selling our next-generation Tesla Roadster until at least one year after the launch of the Model S, which is not expected to be in production until 2012..." The Model S was released in June 2012.
- Canadian deliveries began in February 2010 after first taking orders in 2009.
- On March 16, 2010, Tesla announced that it had "negotiated agreements with key suppliers that will increase total Roadster production by 40 percent and extend sales into 2012", also indicating that it would expand into the Asian and Australian markets by 2011.
- On December 2, 2010, Tesla had delivered more than 1,400 Roadsters.
- On September 28, 2011, Tesla delivered its 100th Roadster in Switzerland.
- Production ended in January 2012 and was no longer available for sale the U.S. after December 2011.
- More than 2,418 units were sold worldwide through September 2012. The remaining cars were available for sale only in Europe and Asia. Most of the remaining Roadsters were sold during the fourth quarter of 2012.
- In 2016, Tesla began selling a battery upgrade from 53 kWh to 80 kWh.

=== Special final edition ===
Tesla produced a special edition of 15 Final Edition Roadsters to close the production cycle of the electric car. The 15 special-edition cars were sold in each of the three sales regions, North America, Europe and Asia, and five units were allocated to each. The Final Edition Roadster did not have any performance modifications, but featured sporting atomic red paint, a duo of dark silver stripes on its hood and rear clamshell, and exclusive anthracite aluminum wheels.

== Specifications ==
=== Motor ===
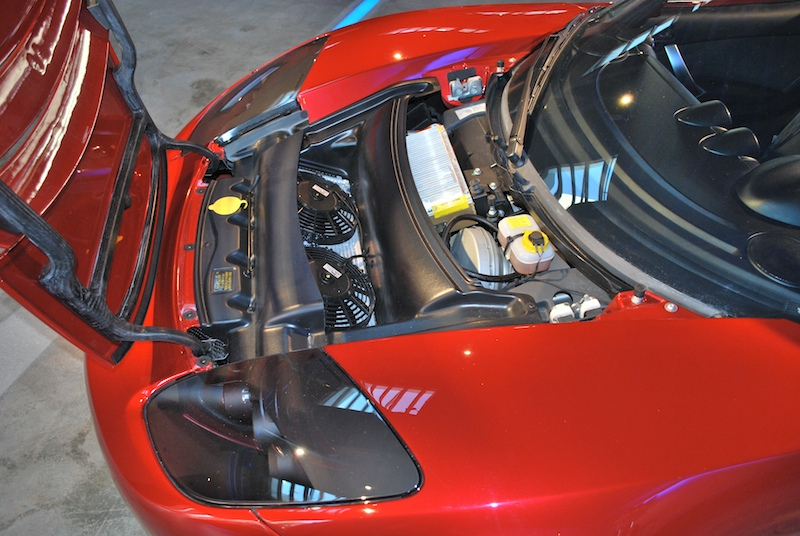

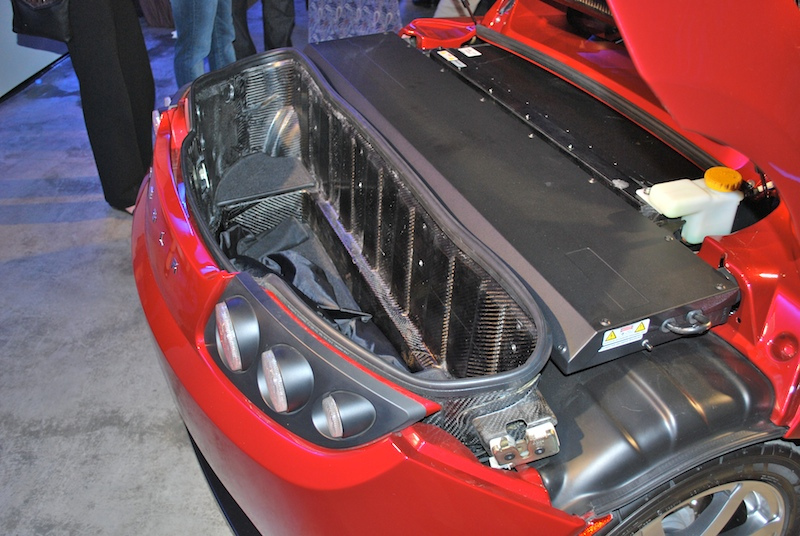
Tesla Roadster with hood and trunk open

The Roadster is powered by a 3-phase, 4-pole, induction electric motor with a maximum output power of 248 hp (185 kW). Its maximum torque of 200 lb⋅ft (270 N⋅m) is immediately available and remains constant from 0 to 6,000 rpm; nearly instantaneous torque is a characteristic of electric motors and offers one of the biggest performance differences from internal combustion engines. The motor is air-cooled and does not need a liquid cooling system.

The Sport model introduced during the Jan 2009 Detroit Auto Show includes a motor with a higher density, hand-wound stator that produces a maximum of 288 hp (215 kW). Both motors are designed for rotational speeds of up to 14,000 rpm, and the regular motor delivers a typical efficiency of 88% or 90%; 80% at peak power. It weighs less than 70 pounds (32 kg).

=== Transmission ===
Starting in September 2008 Tesla selected BorgWarner to manufacture gearboxes and began equipping all Roadsters with a single speed, fixed gear gearbox (8.2752:1 ratio) with an electrically actuated parking pawl mechanism and a mechanical lubrication pump.

The company previously worked with several companies, including XTrac and Magna International, to find the right automatic transmission, but a two-gear solution proved to be too challenging. This led to substantial delays in production. At the "Town Hall Meeting" with owners in December 2007, Tesla announced plans to ship the initial 2008 Roadsters with their interim Magna two-speed direct shift manual transmissions locked into second gear, limiting the performance of the car to less than what was originally stated (0 to 60 mph (0 to 97 km/h) in 5.7 seconds instead of the announced 4.0 seconds). Tesla also announced it would upgrade those transmissions under warranty when the final transmission became available. At the "Town Hall Meeting" with owners on January 30, 2008, Tesla Motors described the planned transmission upgrade as a single-speed gearbox with a drive ratio of 8.27:1 combined with improved electronics and motor cooling that retain the acceleration from 0 to 60 mph (0 to 97 km/h) in under 4 seconds and an improved motor limit of 14,000 rpm to retain the 125 mph (201 km/h) top speed.

==== Gear selector ====
In the interior the gear selector is similar to a push-button automatic with buttons labeled P, R, N and D. Some earlier models have a gear lever similar to that in cars with manual transmission.

=== Performance ===
The Roadster's 0 to 60 mph (0 to 97 km/h) acceleration time is 3.9 seconds for the Standard model and 3.7 seconds for the 2010 V2.5 Sport, which Motor Trend confirmed in the first independent, instrumented testing of the V2.5 Sport model. The magazine also recorded a 0-to-1/4-mile (0.00 to 0.40 km) time of 12.6 seconds at 165.1 km/h (102.6 mph). Tesla said the top speed is electronically limited to 125 mph (201 km/h). Tesla claims it has a weight of 2,877 lb (1,305 kg), a drag coefficient of Cd=0.35–0.36 and a rolling resistance of Crr=0.011.

Tesla began delivering the higher performance version of the Roadster in July 2009. The Roadster Sport has adjustable dampers and a new hand-wound motor, capable of 0 to 60 mph (0 to 97 km/h) in 3.7 seconds. Scotty Pollacheck, a high-performance driver for Killacycle, drove a 2010 Tesla Roadster Sport at the Wayland Invitational Drag Race in Portland, Oregon, in July 2009. He did a quarter-mile (~400 m) in dry conditions in 12.643 seconds, setting a new record in the National Electric Drag Racing Association among the SP/A3 class of vehicles. The EPA combined range (specifying distance traveled between charges) measured in February 2008 for early production Roadsters was 231 mi (372 km) city, 224 mi (360 km) highway, and 227 mi (365 km) combined (city/highway). In August 2008, additional testing with the newer Powertrain 1.5 resulted in an EPA combined range of 393 km (244 mi). The vehicle set a new distance record when it completed the 241-mile (388 km) Rallye Monte Carlo d'Energies Alternatives with 36 mi (58 km) left on the charge. A Roadster drove around the world (although flying as cargo over oceans) in 2012, and repeated it in 80 days with other electric cars in 2016.

Simon Hackett and Emilis Prelgauskas broke the distance record for an electric vehicle, driving 501 km (311 mi) from Alice Springs to Marla, South Australia, in Simon's Tesla Roadster. The car had about 4.8 km (3.0 mi) of range left when the drive was completed.

=== Battery system ===
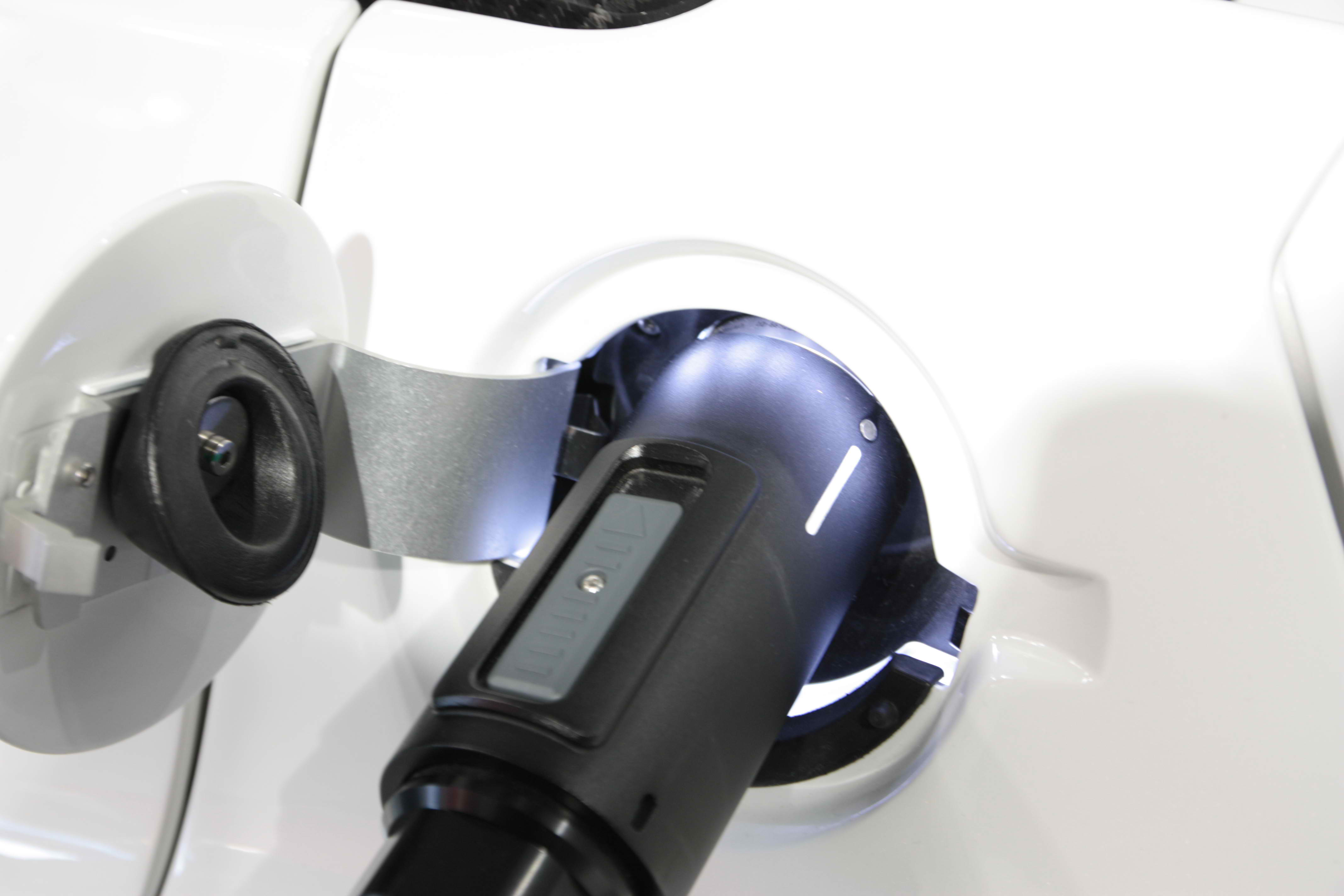
An electrical plug of the Tesla Roadster Sport

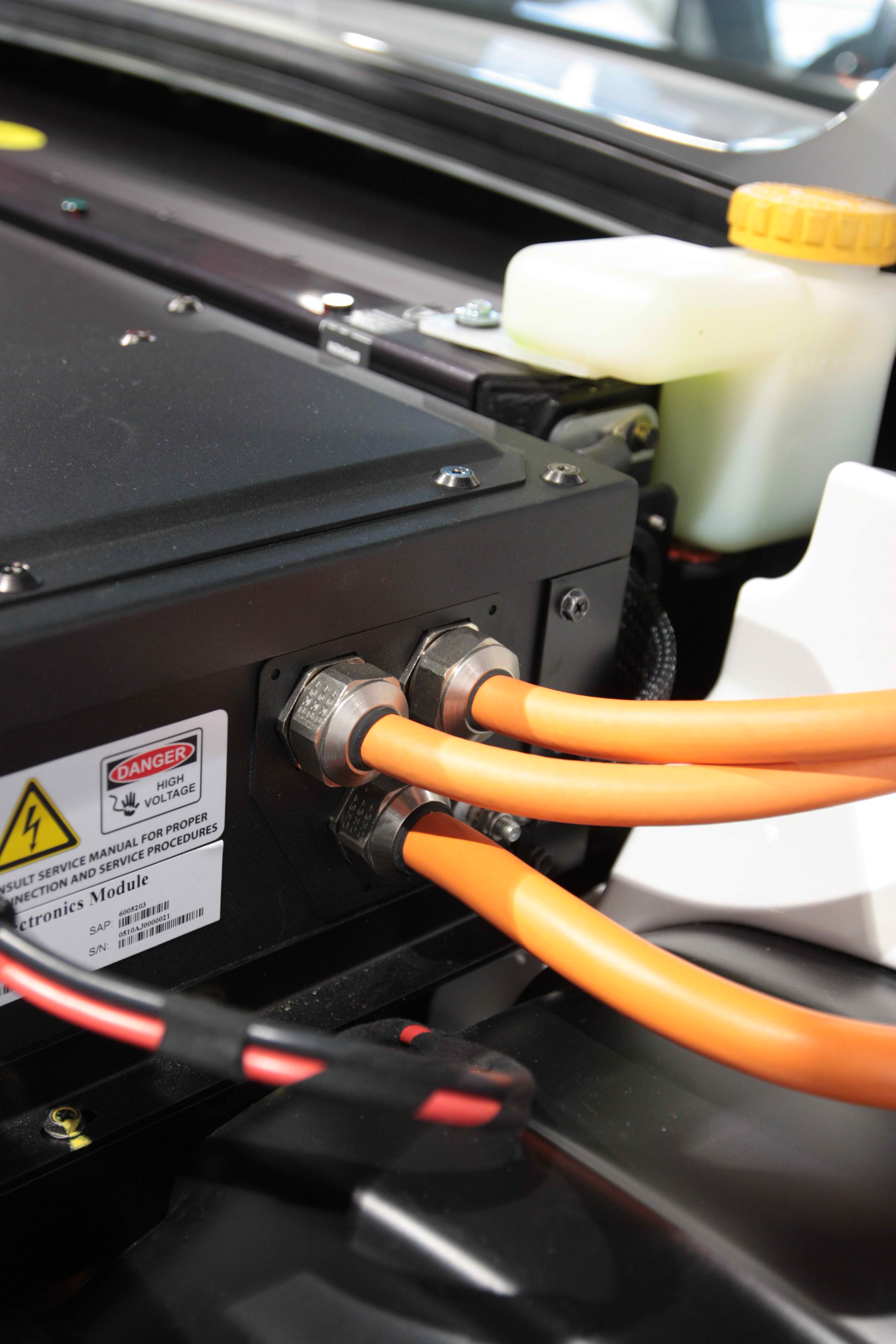
The rear side of a Tesla Roadster battery pack

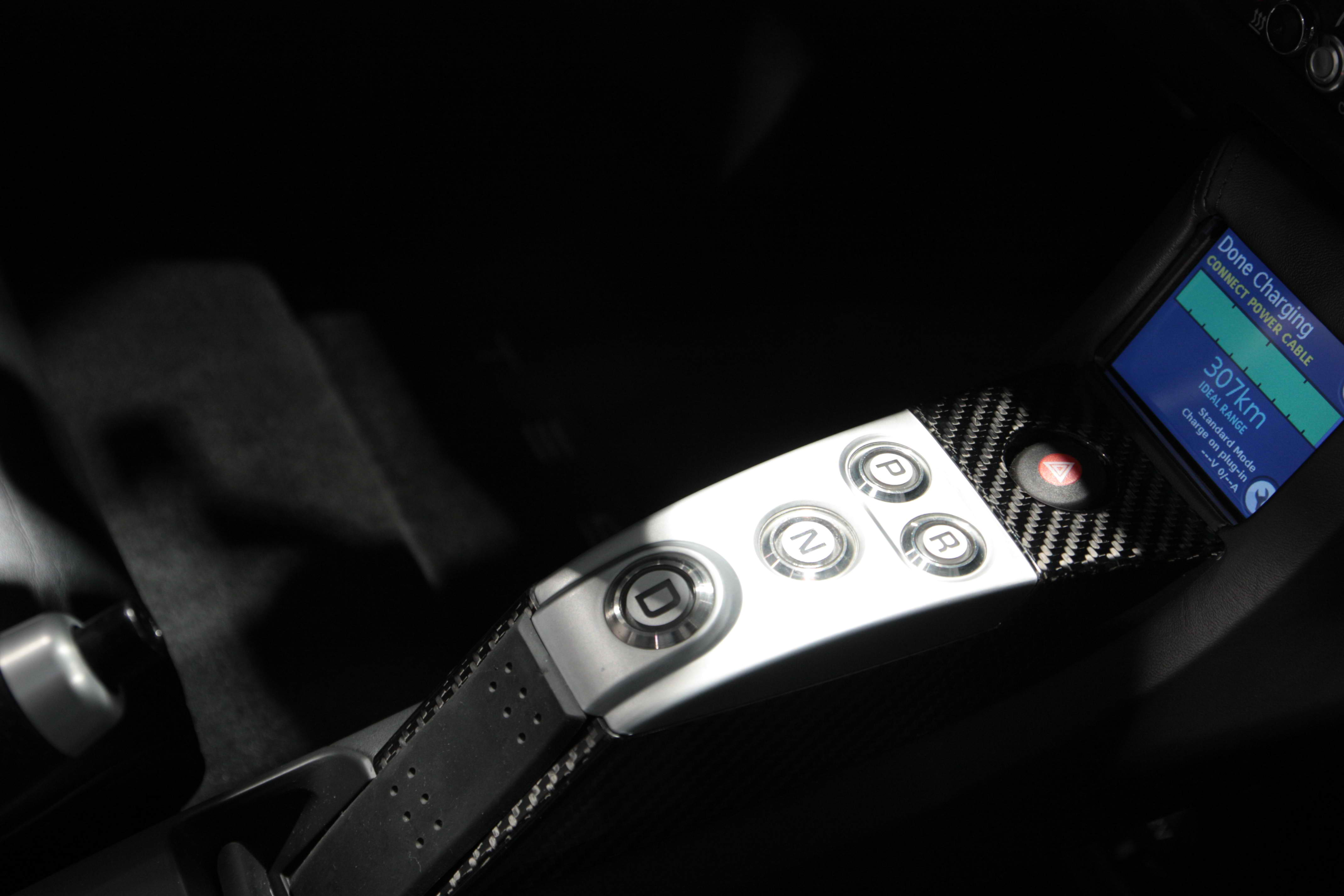
The charging screen of a Tesla Roadster Sport

Tesla refers to the Roadster's battery pack as the Energy Storage System or ESS. The 992-pound (450 kg) ESS contains 6,831 lithium ion cells arranged into 11 "sheets" connected in series; each sheet contains 9 "bricks" connected in series; each "brick" contains 69 cells connected in parallel (11S 9S 69P). The cells are of the 18650 form factor commonly found in laptop batteries. Sources disagree on the exact type of Li-Ion cells—GreenCar says lithium cobalt oxide (LiCo), while researchers at DTU/INESC Porto state lithium manganese oxide (LMO). LiCo has higher reaction energy during thermal runaway than LMO.

The pack is designed to prevent catastrophic cell failures from propagating to adjacent cells (thermal runaway), even when the cooling system is off. Coolant is pumped continuously through the ESS both when the car is running and when the car is turned off if the pack retains more than a 90% charge. The coolant pump draws 146 watts. The cooling and battery management system keeps the temperatures and voltages within specific limits.

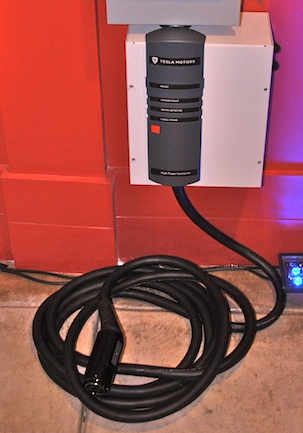
High Power Wall Connector

A full recharge to 53 kWh requires about 3 1/2 hours using the "High Power Wall Connector", which supplies 70-amp, 240-volt electricity.

Tesla said in February 2009 that the ESS had expected life span of seven years/100,000 mi (160,000 km), and began selling pre-purchase battery replacements for about one third of the battery's price today, with the replacement to be delivered after seven years. Tesla says the ESS retains 70% capacity after five years and 50,000 mi (80,000 km) of driving, assuming 10,000 mi (16,000 km) driven each year. A July 2013 study found that after 100,000 mi (160,000 km), Roadster batteries still had 80%–85% capacity and the only significant factor is mileage (not temperature).

Tesla announced plans to sell the battery system to TH!NK and possibly others through its Tesla Energy Group division. The TH!NK plans were put on hold by interim CEO Michael Marks in September 2007.

=== Recharging ===
The Roadster uses a proprietary AC charging connector, although Tesla sells a mobile adapter that enables recharging with an SAE J1772 connector. The vehicle was not provided with any DC fast-charging ability and was not retrofitted later on when the Tesla Supercharger network was established. It can be recharged with AC using:

- A wall-mounted 208–240 V, 70 A maximum current "High Power Wall Connector" which must be hardwired. This appears to be rebadged TS-70 charging station from ClipperCreek.
- A portable 120–240 V, 40 A maximum current "Universal Mobile Connector" that can plug into a NEMA 14–50 receptacle and other 240 V receptacles (e. g. IEC 60309) using adapters that also limit the current to the level the plug and socket can sustain.
- A portable 120 V, 15 A maximum current "Spare Mobile Connector" that plugs into a standard North American domestic socket.

Charging times vary depending on the ESS's state-of-charge, the available voltage, and the available circuit breaker amp rating (current). In a best-case scenario using a 240 V charger on a 90 A circuit breaker, Tesla documents a recharging rate of 56 mi (90 km) of range for each hour charging; a complete recharge from empty would require just under four hours. The slowest charging rate using a 120 V outlet on a 15 A circuit breaker would add 5 mi (8.0 km) of range for each hour charging; a complete recharge from empty would require 48 hours.

=== Technical data ===
	Roadster	Roadster 1.5	Roadster 2.0	Roadster 2.5	Roadster 2.5 Sport	Roadster R80 (3.0) upgrade
Introduced	2006	2007	2009	2010	2010	2014
Gearbox	2-speed Magna (locked in 2nd gear, 2.17:1 ratio)	1-speed BorgWarner (8.27:1 ratio)				
Power	248 hp (185 kW)		288 hp (215 kW)			
Torque	180 lb⋅ft (240 N⋅m)	273 lb⋅ft (370 N⋅m)	280 lb⋅ft (380 N⋅m)		295 lb⋅ft (400 N⋅m)	280 or 295 lb⋅ft (380 or 400 N⋅m)
Battery	53 kWh					80 kWh
Range	200 to 250 mi (320 to 400 km)	231 mi (372 km)	244 mi (393 km)			400 mi (640 km)
Cd	0.36					0.31
0–60 mph	5.7 sec	4 sec	3.9 sec		3.7 sec	
Curb weight	2,690 lb (1,220 kg)	2,877 lb (1,305 kg)	2,727 lb (1,237 kg)			
Top speed	over 130 mph (210 km/h)	125 mph (201 km/h)				
Base price	$80,000–$120,000	$98,950	$109,000	$110,950	$128,500	$29,000 upgrade

== Energy efficiency ==
In June 2006, Tesla reported the Roadster's battery-to-wheel efficiency as 110 Wh/km (17.7 kWh/100 mi) on an unspecified driving cycle—either a constant 60 mph (97 km/h)) or SAE J1634 test—and stated a charging efficiency of 86% for an overall plug-to-wheel efficiency of 128 Wh/km (20.5 kWh/100 mi).

Evolution of the Roadster's plug-to-wheel efficiency (Smaller values indicate better efficiency.)

In March 2007, Tesla reported the Roadster's efficiency on the EPA highway cycle as "135 mpg [U.S.] equivalent, per the conversion rate used by the EPA" or 133 Wh/km (21.5 kWh/100 mi) battery-to-wheel and 155 Wh/km (24.9 kWh/100 mi) plug-to-wheel. The official U.S. window sticker of the 2009 Tesla Roadster showed an EPA rated energy consumption of 32 kWh/100 mi in city and 33 kWh/100 mi on the highway, equivalent to 105 mpg city and 102 mpg highway. The EPA rating for on board energy efficiency for electric vehicles before 2010 was expressed as kilowatt-hour per 100 miles (kWh/100 mi). Since November 2010, with the introduction of the Nissan Leaf and the Chevrolet Volt, EPA began using a new metric, miles per gallon gasoline equivalent (MPGe). The Roadster was never officially rated by the EPA in MPGe.

In August 2007, Tesla dynamometer testing of a validation prototype on the EPA combined cycle yielded a range of 221 mi (356 km) using 23.9 kWh/100 mi (149 Wh/km) battery-to-wheel and 33.6 kWh/100 mi (209 Wh/km) plug-to-wheel.

In February 2008, Tesla reported improved plug-to-wheel efficiency after testing a validation prototype car at an EPA-certified location. Those tests yielded a range of 220 mi (350 km) and a plug-to-wheel efficiency of 32.1 kWh/100 mi (199 Wh/km).

In August 2008, Tesla reported on testing with the new, single-speed gearbox and upgraded electronics of powertrain 1.5, which yielded an EPA range of 244 mi (393 km) and an EPA combined cycle, plug-to-wheel efficiency of 28 kWh/100 mi (174 Wh/km).

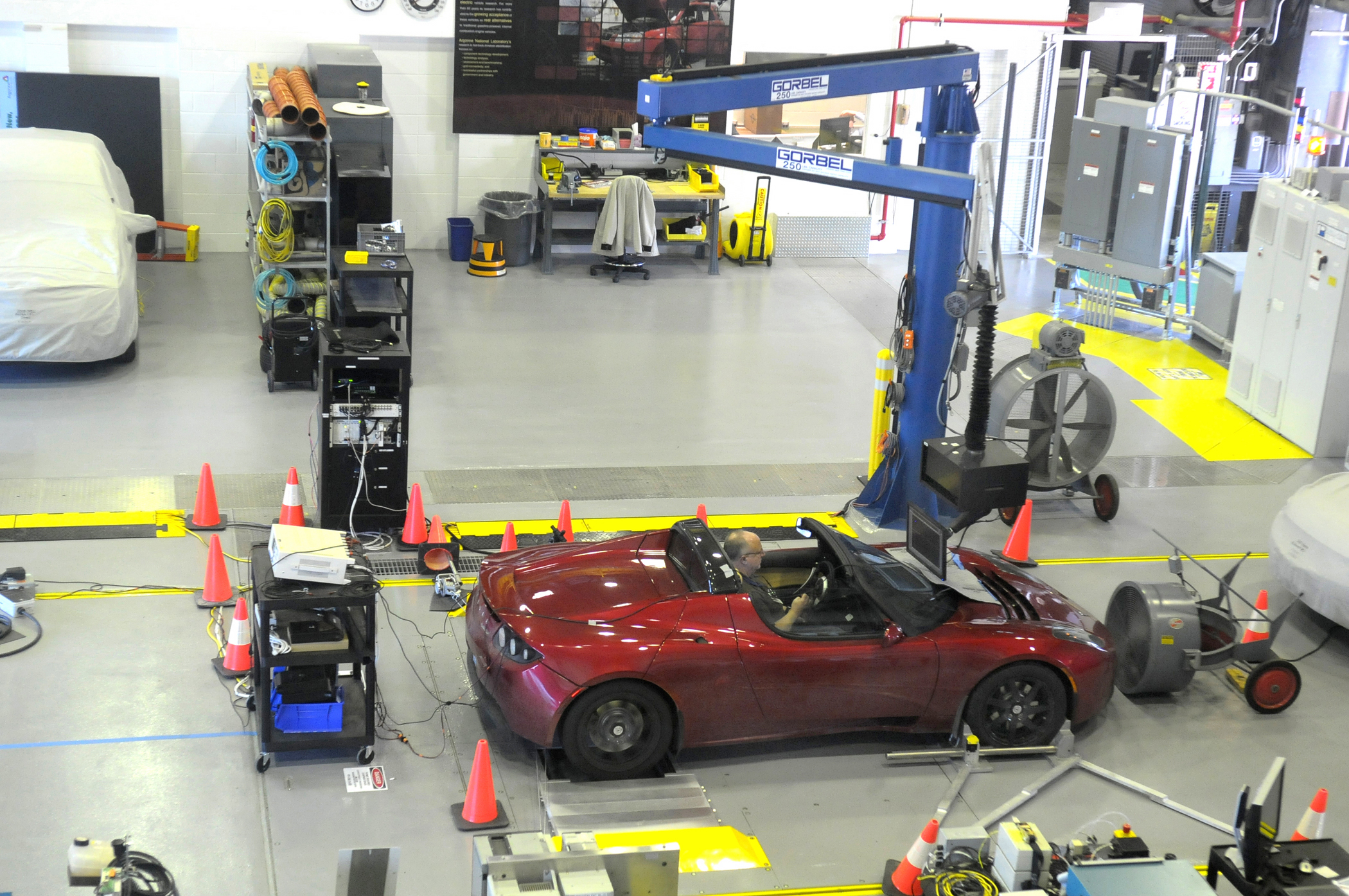
Roadster being tested through a driving cycle at Argonne National Laboratory's two-wheel dynamometer. These tests helped researchers develop test procedures to evaluate fuel efficiency in electric vehicles in 2010.

In 2007, the Roadster's battery-to-wheel motor efficiency was reported as 88% to 90% on average and 80% at peak power. For comparison, internal combustion engines have a tank-to-wheel efficiency of about 15%. Taking a more complete picture including the cost of energy drawn from its source, Tesla reports that their technology, assuming electricity generated from natural gas-burning power plants, has a high well-to-wheel efficiency of 1.14 km per megajoule, compared to 0.202 km/MJ for gasoline-powered sports cars, 0.478 km/MJ for gasoline-powered commuter cars, 0.556 km/MJ for hybrid cars, and 0.348 km/MJ for hydrogen fuel cell vehicles.

=== Petroleum-equivalent efficiency ===
As the Roadster does not use gasoline, petroleum efficiency (MPG, L/100 km) cannot be measured directly but instead is calculated using one of several equivalent methods:

A number comparable to the typical Monroney sticker's "pump-to-wheel" fuel efficiency is calculated based on regulations from the DOE using its energy content for a U.S. gallon of gasoline of 33,705 Wh/gal (also called the Lower Heating Value (LHV) of gasoline):

$$\frac{33705\,\frac{\mathrm{Wh}}{\mathrm{gal_{ge}}}}
{135\,\frac{\mathrm{Wh}}{\mathrm{km}} \times \frac{1.6\, \mathrm{km}}{\mathrm{mi}}}
\times 77.6 \% {\mathrm{_{charging\ eff.}}}= 120 \,\mathrm{mpg_{ge}} = 1.95 \frac{\mathrm{L_{ge}}}{100\, \mathrm{km}}$$

For CAFE regulatory purposes, the DOE's full petroleum-equivalency equation combines the primary energy efficiencies of the US electric grid and the well-to-pump path with a "fuel content factor" that quantifies the value of conservation, scarcity of fuels, and energy security in the US. This regulation uses a factor of 82,049 Wh/gal in the above equation and results in a regulatory fuel efficiency of 293 mpg_{ge}_{CAFE}.

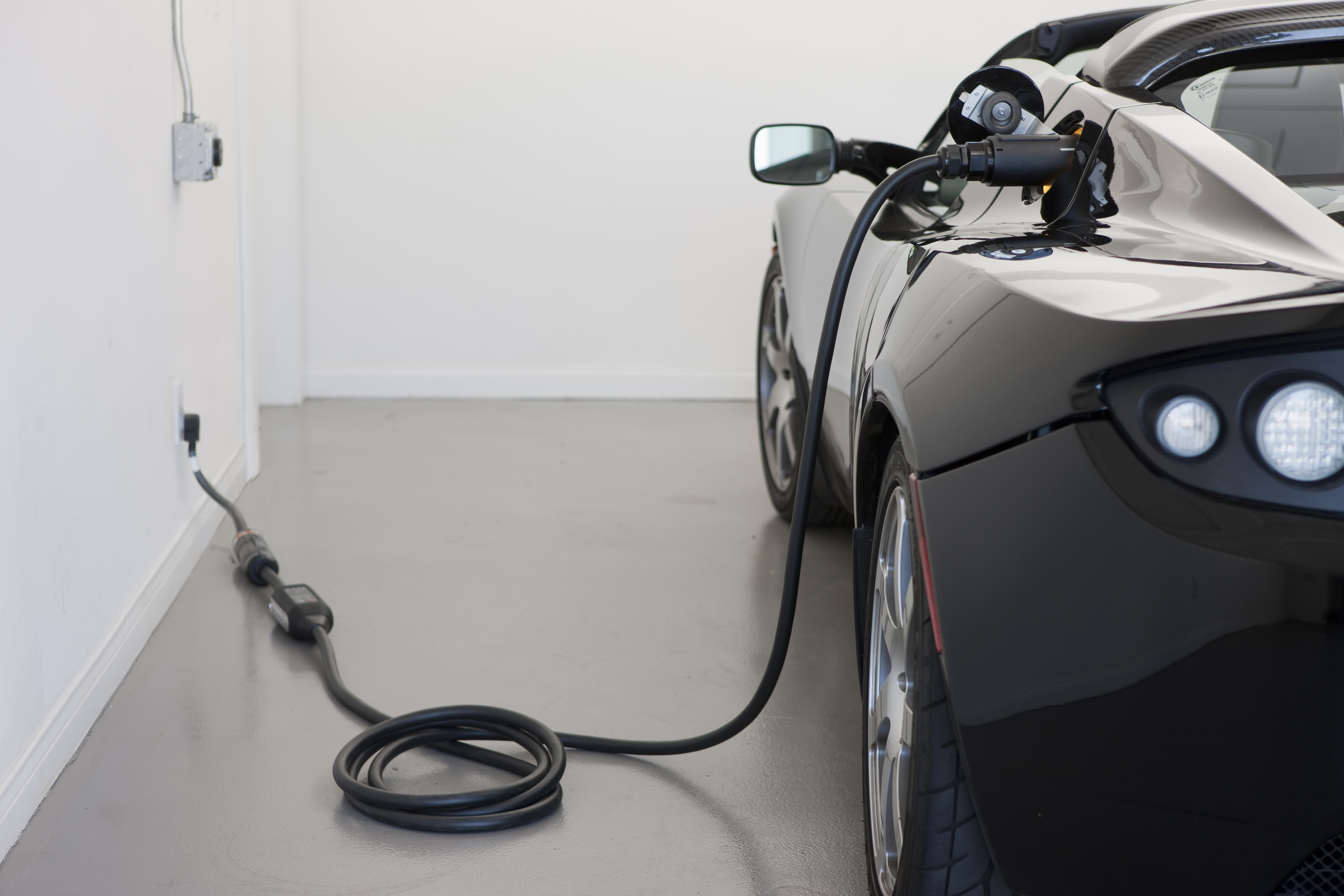
Tesla Roadster 2.5 charging from a conventional outlet

Recharging with electricity from the average US grid, the conversion factor is 12,307 Wh/gal_{US} to remove the "fuel content factor" = 1/0.15 and the full-cycle energy-equivalency is 44.0 mpg_{ge full-cycle}. For full-cycle comparison, the window sticker or "pump-to-wheel" value from a gasoline-fueled vehicle must be multiplied by the fuel's "well-to-pump" efficiency. The DOE regulation specifies a "well-to-pump" efficiency of 83% for gasoline. The 2006 Prius's sticker 46 mpg_{‑US} (5.1 L/100 km; 55 mpg_{‑imp}), for example, converts to a full-cycle energy-equivalent of 38.2 mpg_{full-cycle}.

Recharging with electricity generated by newer, 58% efficiency CCGT power plants, results in a conversion factor of 21,763 Wh/gal and yields a fuel efficiency of 77.7 mpg_{ge}.

Recharging with non-fossil fuel electricity sources such as hydroelectric, solar power, wind or nuclear, the petroleum equivalent efficiency can be even higher as fossil fuel is not directly used in refueling.

== Service ==
Whereas vehicles with internal combustion engines require more frequent service for oil changes and routine maintenance on engine components and other related systems, Tesla's website recommends the owner bring the vehicle in for service "once a year or every 12,000 miles". For other concerns with vehicles, Tesla created a "mobile service unit" that dispatches company-trained technicians to customers' homes or offices in case the owner is experiencing problems. Tesla charges the customer according to the distance the service unit needs to travel: one US dollar per mile roundtrip with a 100-dollar minimum. Technicians drive company vans equipped with numerous tools and testing equipment to do "in the field" repairs, enhancements and software upgrades. Tesla debuted this "house call" approach in the spring of 2009, when the company announced a recall due to a manufacturing problem in the Lotus assembly plant, which also affected the Lotus Elise and other models from the British sports car maker.

The first Tesla service center, in Los Angeles, California, was opened on Santa Monica Boulevard on May 1, 2008. Tesla publicly opened their second showroom and service area in Menlo Park, California on July 22, 2008. The Menlo Park location was also the final assembly area for Tesla Roadsters.

In 2007, Tesla announced plans to build additional service centers over the following few years to support sales of its next vehicle, the Model S sports sedan. This included an additional 15 service centers in United States major metropolitan locations. Possible locations for sales and service locations in Europe were announced in a letter to customers in May 2008.

=== Recalls ===
Tesla issued two product safety recalls for the Roadster.

In May 2009, Tesla issued a recall for 345 Roadsters manufactured before April 22, 2009. Tesla sent technicians to customers' homes to tighten the rear, inner hub flange bolts. Using wording from the National Highway Traffic and Safety Administration, Tesla told customers that without this adjustment, the driver could lose control of the car. The problem originated at the Lotus assembly line, where the Roadster glider was built. Lotus also recalled some Elise and Exige vehicles for the same reason.

On October 1, 2010, Tesla issued a second product safety recall in the US affecting 439 Roadsters. The recall involved the 12 V low-voltage auxiliary cable from a redundant back-up system. The recall followed an incident where the low voltage auxiliary cable in a vehicle chafed against the edge of a carbon fiber panel, causing a short, smoke and a possible fire behind the right front headlamp. This issue was limited to the 12 V low-voltage auxiliary cable and did not involve the main battery pack or main power system.

== Reviews ==
Tesla Roadster reviews can be grouped in two main categories: older reviews of "validation prototypes" (2006–2008), before Tesla began serial production and customer deliveries, and reviews on cars in serial production (2008–2010).

The global online auto review site Autoguide.com tested Tesla's fourth-generation car in October 2010. Autoguide editor Derek Kreindler said "The Tesla Roadster 2.5 S is a massively impressive vehicle, more spacecraft than sports car. Theories like global warming, peak oil and rising oil prices should no longer bring heart palpitations to car fans. The Tesla shows just how good zero-emissions 'green' technology can be. Quite frankly, getting into a normal car at the end of the test drive was a major letdown. The whirr of the engine, the shove in the backside and the little roadster that seems to pivot around you is replaced by a grunting, belching, feedback-free driving experience". He continues on that "but for a $100,000 car, it could use some work" complaining of purposefully cheap work.

In the March 2010 print edition of British enthusiast magazine EVO (p. 120), editor Richard Meaden was the first to review the all-new right-hand-drive version of the Roadster. He said the car had "serious, instantaneous muscle". "With so much torque from literally no revs the acceleration punch is wholly alien. Away from traffic lights you'd murder anything, be it a 911 Turbo, GT-R or 599, simply because while they have to mess about with balancing revs and clutch, or fiddle with launch controls and invalid warranties, all you have to do is floor the throttle and wave goodbye".

In December 2009, The Wall Street Journal editor Joseph White conducted an extended test-drive and determined that "you can have enormous fun within the legal speed limit as you whoosh around unsuspecting Camry drivers, zapping from 40 to 60 miles per hour in two seconds while the startled victims eat your electric dust". White praised the car's environmental efficiency but said consumer demand reflected not the environmental attributes of the car but its performance. "The Tesla turns the frugal environmentalist aesthetic on its head. Sure, it doesn't burn petroleum, and if plugged into a wind turbine or a nuclear plant, it would be a very low-carbon machine. But anyone who buys one will get the most satisfaction from smoking someone's doors off. The Tesla's message is that 'green' technology can appeal to the id, not just the superego".

In December 2009, Motor Trend was the first to independently confirm the Roadster Sport's reported 0 to 60 mph (0 to 97 km/h) time of 3.7 seconds. (Motor Trend recorded 0 to 60 mph (0 to 97 km/h) of 3.70 seconds; it recorded a quarter-mile test at 12.6 sec at 102.6 mph (165.1 km/h).) Engineering editor Kim Reynolds called the acceleration "breathtaking" and said the car confirms "Tesla as an actual car company. ...Tesla is the first maker to crack the EV legitimacy barrier in a century".

In November 2009, Automobile Magazine West Coast editor Jason Cammisa spent a week driving a production Tesla Roadster. Cammisa was immediately impressed with the acceleration, saying the car "explodes off the line, pulling like a small jet plane. ... It's like driving a Lamborghini with a big V-12 revved over 6000 rpm at all times, waiting to pounce—without the noise, vibration, or misdemeanor arrest for disturbing the peace". He also took the car to Infineon Raceway in Sonoma, California, and praised the car for its robustness, saying the Roadster:

wins the Coolest Car I've Ever Driven award. Why? Despite the flat-out sprints, the drag racing, the donuts, the top-speed runs, and dicing through traffic like there's a jet pack strapped to the trunk, Pacific Gas and Electric—which generated power for the Tesla—released into the atmosphere the same amount of carbon dioxide as would a gasoline-powered car getting 99 mpg. And the Roadster didn't break. It didn't smoke, lock up, freeze, or experience flux-capacitor failure. Over the past ten decades, no company has been able to reinvent the car—not General Motors with the EV1, not Toyota with the Prius. And now, a bunch of dudes from Silicon Valley have created an electric car that really works—as both an environmental fix and a speed fix

In 2009 the Tesla Roadster was one of the Scandinavian Sports Car of the Year participants. In a comparison made by Nordic car magazines Tekniikan Maailma (Finland), Teknikens Värld (Sweden) and Bil Magasinet (Denmark), critics praised the torque of the car and a track car structure, but also highlighted more negative aspects such as a short battery life; they were unable to drive a full track lap in dry track conditions.

In May 2009, Car and Driver technical editor Aaron Robinson wrote a review based on the first extended test-drive of a production Tesla Roadster. Robinson had the car for nearly a week at his home. He complained of "design anomalies, daily annoyances, absurd ergonomics, and ridiculous economics" and stated he never got to see if the car could go 240 miles on a single charge because the torturous seating forced him to stop driving the car. He also complained of Tesla increasing the car prices on those who had already made deposits and charging extra for previously free necessary components.

In February 2009, automotive critic Dan Neil of the Los Angeles Times called the production Tesla Roadster "a superb piece of machinery: stiff, well sorted, highly focused, dead-sexy and eerily quick". Neil said he had the car for 24 hours but "caned it like the Taliban caned Gillette salesmen and it never even blinked".

In February 2009, Road & Track tested another production vehicle and conducted the first independently verified metered testing of the Roadster. Engineering editor Dennis Simanaitis said the testing confirmed what he called "extravagant claims", that the Roadster had a 4.0 s 0 to 60 mph (0 to 97 km/h) acceleration and a 200-mile (320 km) range. They said the Roadster felt like "an over-ballasted Lotus Elise", but the weight was well-distributed, so the car remained responsive. "Fit and finish of our Tesla were exemplary", which Road & Track thought fit the target market. Overall, they considered it a "delight" to drive. Testing a pre-production car in early 2008, Road & Track said "The Tesla feels composed and competent at speed with great turn-in and transitioning response", though they recommended against it as a "primary grocery-getter".

In January 2009, automotive critic Warren Brown of The Washington Post called the production Roadster "a head-turner, jaw-dropper. It is sexy as all get-out". He described the feeling behind the wheel as, "Wheeeeeee! Drive a Tesla, even if you have to fly to Tesla's Menlo Park, Calif., headquarters, to get your hands on one for a day. ... If this is the future of the automobile, I want it".

In a review of a Roadster prototype in March 2008, before the cars were in serial production, Motor Trend gave a generally favorable review, stating that it was "undeniably, unbelievably efficient" and would be "profoundly humbling to just about any rumbling Ferrari or Porsche that makes the mistake of pulling up next to a silent, 105 mpg_{‑US} (2.2 L/100 km; 126 mpg_{‑imp}) Tesla Roadster at a stoplight"; they nonetheless detected a "nasty drive-train buck" during the test drive of an early Roadster with the older, two-speed transmission.

In a July 8, 2007, review of a prototype Roadster, Jay Leno wrote, "If you like sports cars and you want to be green, this is the only way to go. The Tesla is a car that you can live with, drive and enjoy as a sports car. I had a brief drive in the car and it was quite impressive. This is an electric car that is fun to drive".

In a November 27, 2006, review of a prototype Roadster in Slate, Paul Boutin wrote, "A week ago, I went for a spin in the fastest, most fun car I've ever ridden in—and that includes the Aston Martin I tried to buy once. I was so excited, in fact, that I decided to take a few days to calm down before writing about it. Well, my waiting period is over, I'm thinking rationally, and I'm still unbelievably stoked about the Tesla".

=== Top Gear controversy ===
In the third quarter of 2008, Top Gear's Jeremy Clarkson reviewed two production Roadsters with the v1.5 transmission and described the driving experience with the exclamations "God Almighty! Wave goodbye to dial-up, and say hello to the world of broadband motoring!" and "This car is biblically quick!" when comparing the acceleration versus the car the Roadster was based on, a Lotus Elise. Clarkson also noted, however, that the handling of the car was not as sharp as that of the Elise: "through the corners things are less rosy". The segment also claimed that the car's batteries would run flat after 55 mi (89 km) of heavy use on a track and showed the car being pushed off the track.

Tesla spokesperson responded with statements in blogs and to mainstream news organizations that the cars provided to Top Gear never had less than 20% charge and never experienced brake failure. In addition, neither car provided to Top Gear needed to be pushed off the track at any point. Clarkson also showed a wind turbine with stationary rotor blades and complained that it would take countless hours to refuel the car using such a source of electricity, although the car can be charged from a 240 V 70 A outlet in as little as 3.5 hours. After numerous blogs and several large news organizations began following the controversy, the BBC issued a statement saying "the tested Tesla was filmed being pushed into the shed in order to show what would happen if the Roadster had run out of charge. Top Gear stands by the findings in this film and is content that it offers a fair representation of the Tesla's performance on the day it was tested", without addressing the other alleged misrepresentations that Tesla highlighted to the media. After several weeks of increasing pressure and inquiries from the BBC, Clarkson wrote a blog entry for The Times, acknowledging that "Inevitably, the film we had shot was a bit of a mess. There was a handful of shots of a silver car. Some of a grey car". "But as a device for moving you and your things around, it is about as much use as a bag of muddy spinach".

On March 29, 2011, Tesla sued the programme over libel and malicious falsehood, while simultaneously launching the website TeslaVsTopGear.com. The current position of Tesla is found on its web page. In a blogpost, producer Andy Wilman has referred to Tesla's allegations as a "crusade" and contested the truth value of Tesla's statements. On October 19, 2011, the High Court in London rejected Tesla's libel claim. Tesla appealed High Court's decision to the Court of Appeal, where a three-judge panel of Lords Justice upheld the lower court's decision, and ordered Tesla to pay the BBC's legal costs of £100,000.

== Sales ==
Tesla delivered approximately 2,450 Roadsters worldwide between February 2008 and December 2012. Featuring new options and enhanced features, the 2012 Tesla Roadster was sold in limited numbers only in mainland Europe, Asia and Australia, and as of July 2012, less than 140 units were available for sale in Europe and Asia before the remaining inventory would be sold out. Tesla's US exemption for not having special two-stage passenger airbags expired for cars made after the end of 2011 so the last Roadsters were not sold in the American market for regulatory reasons. The U.S. was the leading market with about 1,800 Roadsters sold.

=== United States ===
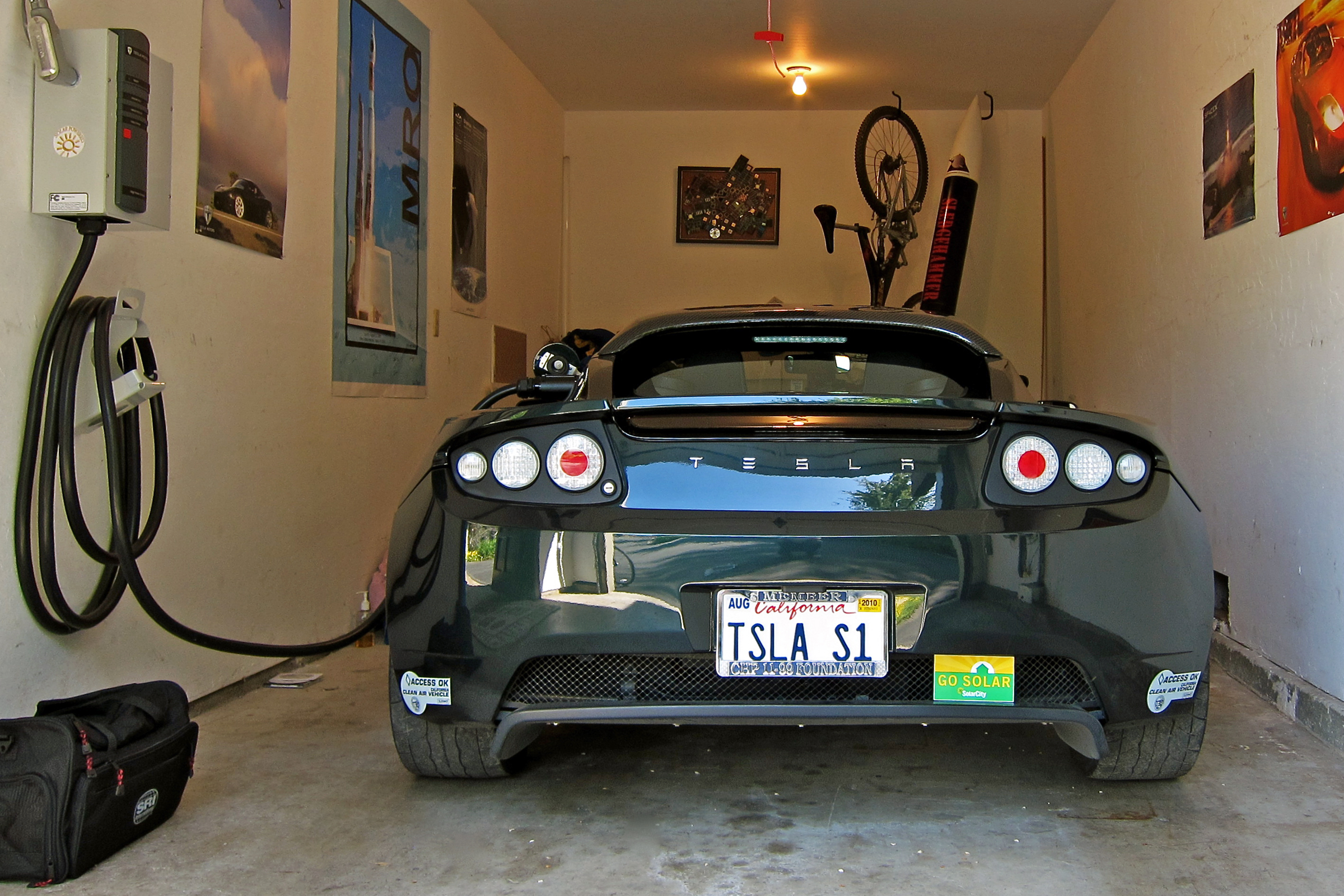
Roadster with California's Clean Air Vehicle stickers (at the extremes of the bumper) that allows access to HOV lanes with solo driver

In July 2009, Tesla announced that US consumers could finance the Roadster through Bank of America. Financing was available for up to 75% of the total vehicle purchase price.

Tesla sold Roadsters directly to customers. It sold them online, in 13 showrooms and over the phone in North America and Europe. Tesla does not operate through franchise dealerships but operates company-owned stores. The company said that it took its retail cues from Apple, Starbucks and other non-automotive retailers.

=== Outside the United States ===
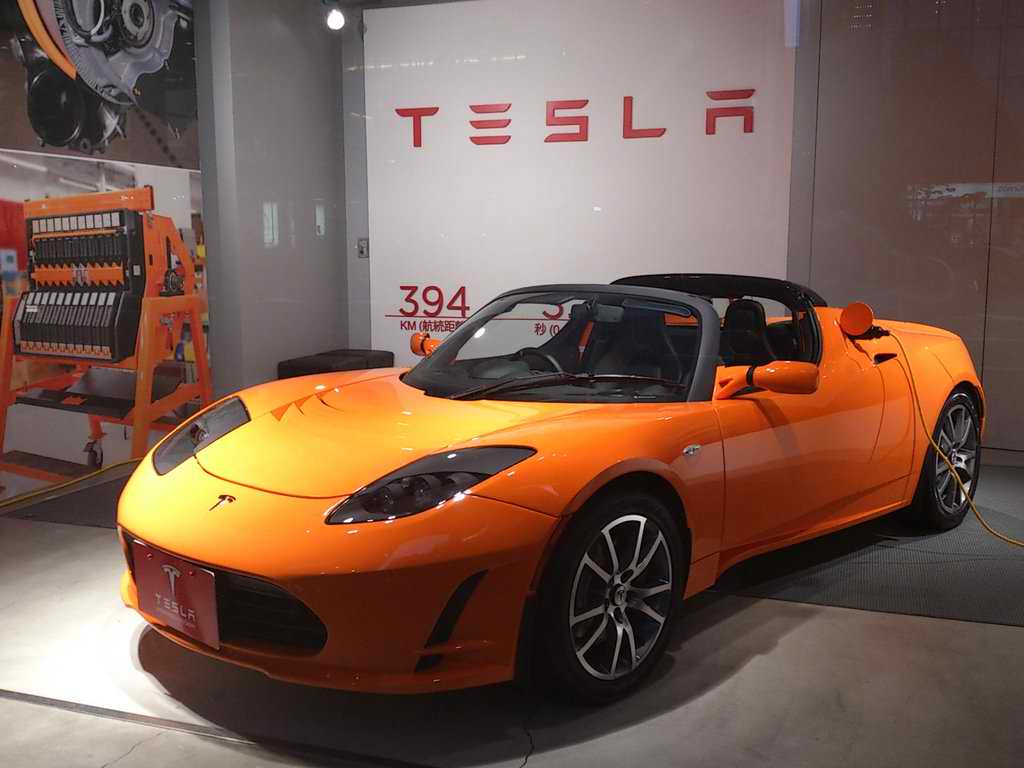
Roadster charging in a Japanese showroom

The company has been shipping cars to European customers since mid-2009. Tesla sold out of its EU special-edition vehicle, which had a 2010 model-year production run of 250 cars. A total of 575 units have been sold in Europe through October 2012.

Tesla first overseas showroom opened in London in 2009, with right-hand-drive models promised for early 2010. Showrooms in Munich and Monaco were also added in 2009, followed by Zurich and Copenhagen in 2010 and Milan in 2011. Reservations for the 2010 Roadster were available for a €3,000 refundable reservation fee.

From 2009 to 2014, Hansjoerg von Gemmingen of Karlsruhe, Germany drove his Tesla Roadster 400,000 km (250,000 mi), this being the mileage world record for an all-electric vehicle and reached 520,000 km (320,000 mi) in 2017. He also drove another 200,000 km (120,000 mi) in a Tesla Model S and voiced his plan to become the first man to travel a million kilometres in an electric vehicle.

=== Pricing complaints ===
In 2009, Roadster reservation holders who had already placed deposits up to US$50,000 (~$72,821 in 2025) to lock in their orders were informed that their orders had been unlocked and that they had to re-option their ordered vehicles on the threat of losing their spot on the orders list. Tesla then raised the prices of several options, and a new Tesla Roadster with the same set of features that had previously been standard became US$6,700 more expensive than before. For example, the high performance charger that was previously claimed to be standard on all vehicles was changed to be an optional feature costing US$3,000, and the previously claimed standard forged alloy wheels became a US$2,300 upgrade. One person who pre-ordered a Tesla Roadster complained:

I am [pre-ordered owner] number 395. I am not a rich person dabbling in a plaything. I thought I was actually doing some good by supporting a company that was moving us to a more sustainable future. I put $50,000 of my own money down on this car in May of 2007. I withstood the delays. I held in there when it almost seemed the company was going bankrupt. Now, after locking in my options, they pull this on me.

== Awards ==
The world distance record of 501 km (311 mi) for a production electric car on a single charge was set by a Roadster on October 27, 2009, during the Global Green Challenge in outback Australia, in which it averaged a speed of 25 mph (40 km/h). In March 2010, a Tesla Roadster became the first electric vehicle to win the Monte Carlo Alternative Energy Rally and the first to win any Federation Internationale de l'Automobile-sanctioned championship when a Roadster driven by former Formula One driver Érik Comas beat 96 competitors for range, efficiency and performance in the three-day, nearly 1,000-kilometre (620 mi) challenge.

- INDEX: Award 2007
- BusinessWeek: Best Product Design of 2007, Ecodesign
- Forbes: Best Cars 2006: New car that best lived up to the Hype
- Time: Best Inventions 2008 – Transportation Invention
- Time: Best Inventions 2006 – Transportation Invention
- Popular Mechanics: Breakthrough Awards 2006
- Global Green USA: Product/Industrial Design
- CarDomain: People's Choice: Most Exciting 2007 Car Launch
- 2009 Best Green Exotic, duPont REGISTRY

== Space launch ==
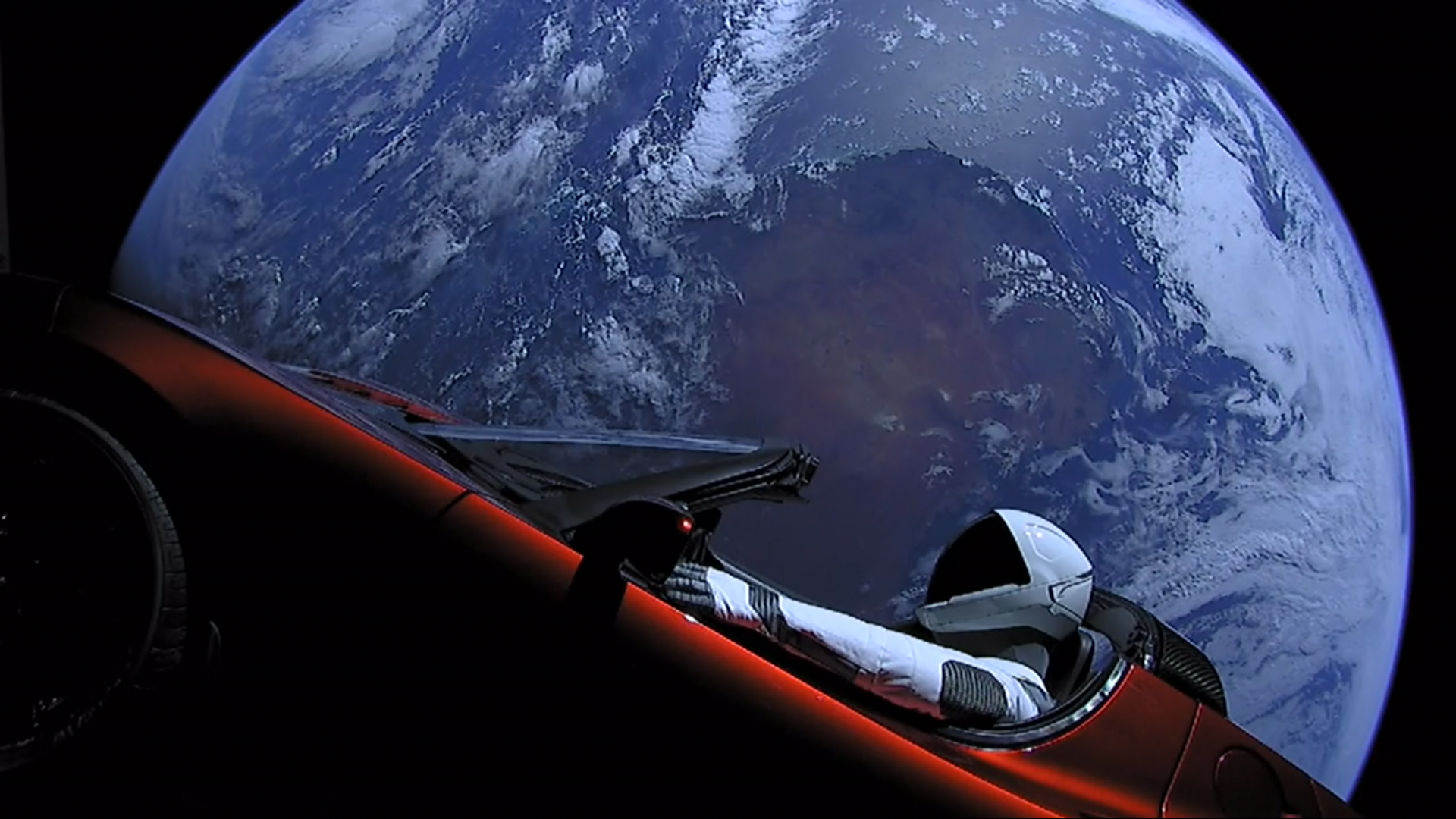
Roadster in space, prior to departing Earth orbit, with "Starman" mannequin sitting at the wheel

In December 2017, Elon Musk announced that his personal Tesla Roadster, sn:686, would be launched into space, serving as dummy payload on the maiden flight of the SpaceX Falcon Heavy rocket. The launch on February 6, 2018, was successful; the vehicle was placed into a heliocentric orbit that took it beyond Mars's orbital path around the Sun. The Roadster was the first production car to be launched into space.

== See also ==
- List of electric cars currently available
- List of modern production plug-in electric vehicles
- List of production battery electric vehicles
- Detroit Electric SP.01
- Revenge of the Electric Car
