= Rocket eBook =

Commercial handheld e-reader

- Developer: NuvoMedia
- Released: 1998

The Rocket eBook is an early commercial handheld e-reader that was produced by NuvoMedia in late 1998; it uses an LCD screen and can store up to ten e-books. E-books are loaded on the device by connecting it to a computer, and the device has two page turn buttons. Rocket-compatible e-books were sold online at Barnes & Noble and Powell's Bookstore. It had a retail price of $499.

The Rocket eBook was manufactured by NuvoMedia until 2000, when it was purchased by Gemstar-TV Guide International for $187 million. After purchasing NuvoMedia and merging it with SoftBook, Gemstar released an e-reader called the RCA eBook Reader.

== NuvoMedia ==
On April 15, 1997, Martin Eberhard and Marc Tarpenning founded NuvoMedia to make a product that could benefit from improving battery size and settled on designing an electronic book reader; the resulting Rocket eBook e-reader sold 20,000 units in 1999.
