= Hibar Systems =

Defunct manufacturer of automated, precision liquid dispensing systems

Hibar Systems Ltd

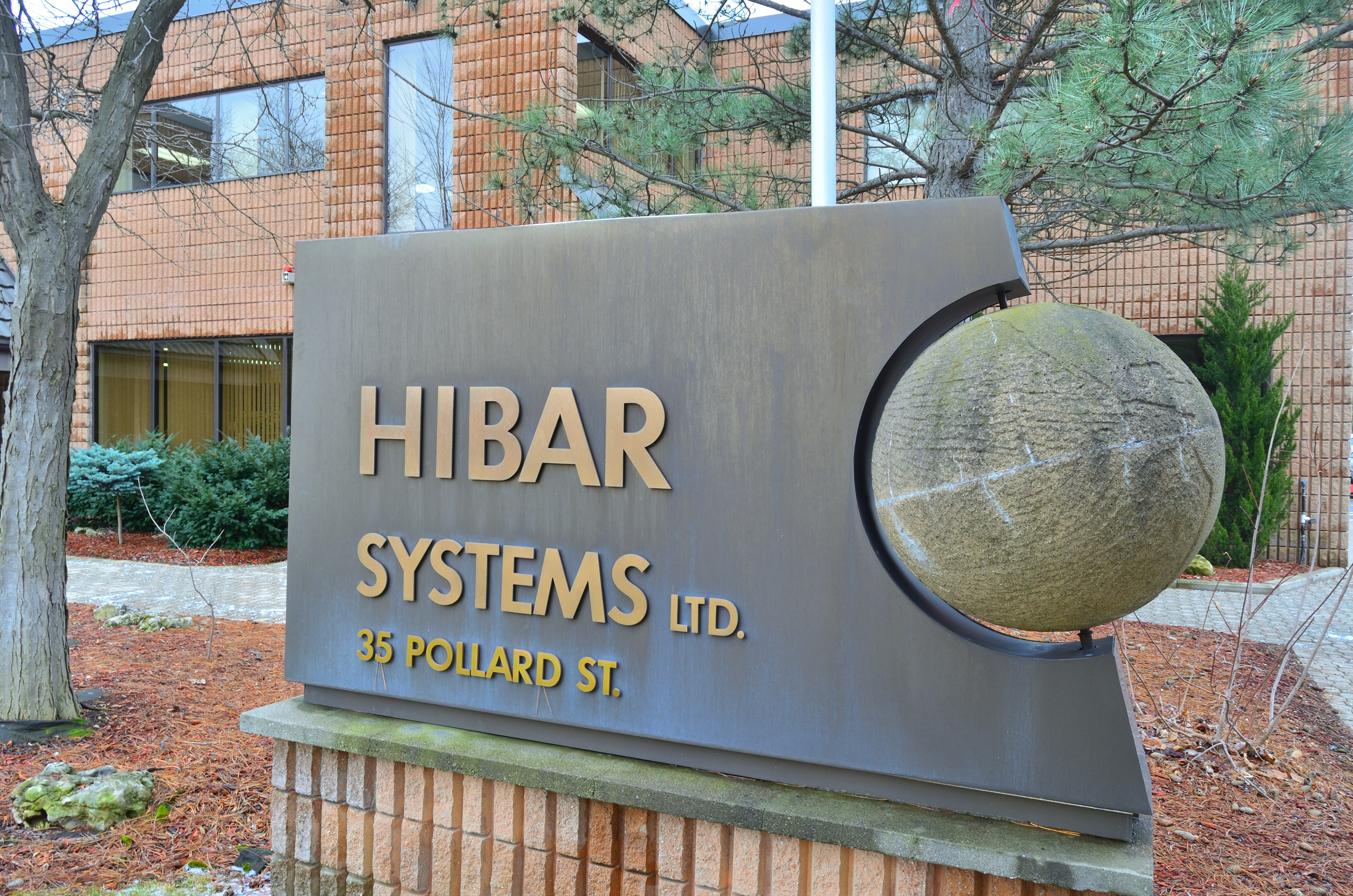
- Company type: Subsidiary
- Founded: 1974
- Founders: Heinz Barall
- Defunct: 2019
- Fate: Acquired by Tesla, Inc.
- Headquarters: 35 Pollard Street, Richmond Hill, Ontario, Canada
- Products: Precision dispensing pumps and filling systems
- Parent: Tesla, Inc.
- Website: hibar.com (defunct)

Hibar Systems Ltd was a Canadian manufacturer of automated, precision liquid dispensing and filling systems.

== History ==
Hibar was started in 1974 when German-born Canadian engineer Heinz Barall developed a prototype of a precision metering pump that would dispense a small, precise amount (two microlitres) of electrolytes into button cell batteries. Barall took his prototype to one of the world's largest battery companies, where representatives were so impressed with its flawless performance, they kept the prototype and ordered more.

Building on its success in the battery industry, over the next 40 years, Hibar started building precision liquid dispensing systems for other industries, such as filling printer ink cartridges, putting pharmaceuticals into vials, and packaging cosmetics. The company also continued to supply its products to the battery production industry and developed new vacuum filling systems for lithium-ion battery applications.

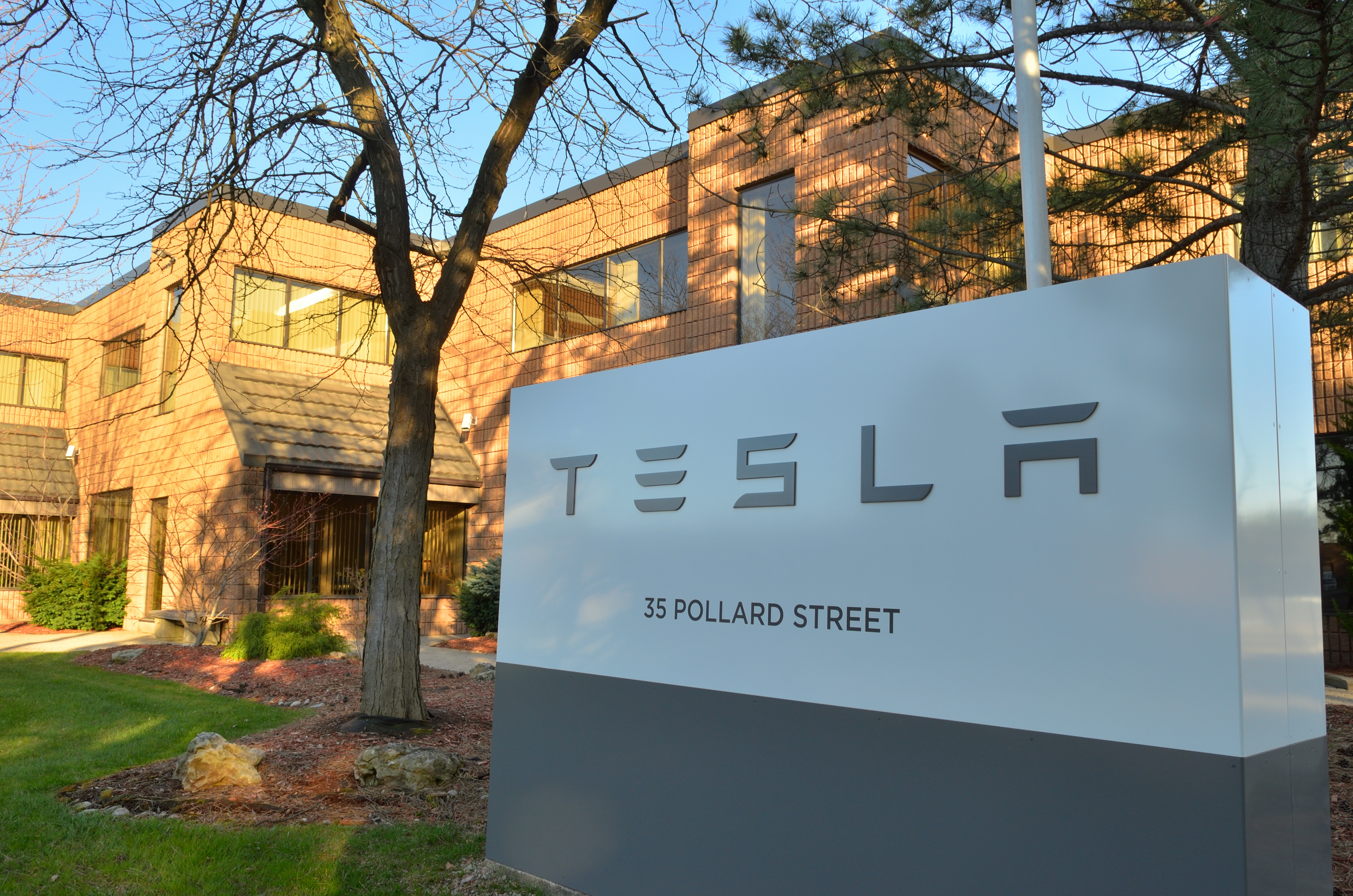
Sign outside of office after acquisition by Tesla, Inc.

Hibar's technology caught the eye of Tesla, Inc., which builds battery-electric vehicles and battery energy systems. Tesla quietly acquired Hibar sometime in 2019, which was first revealed in an October 2019 filing with the Canadian government.

The purchase came amid an acquisition spree where Tesla bought six other small companies with expertise in automation or battery technology.

Tesla merged the company into its operation, removing the Hibar signage from in front of the Richmond Hill office building in 2020 and changing the legal name on Hibar's website to Tesla Toronto Automation ULC in 2021.
