= Martin Eberhard =

American engineer and business executive (born 1960)

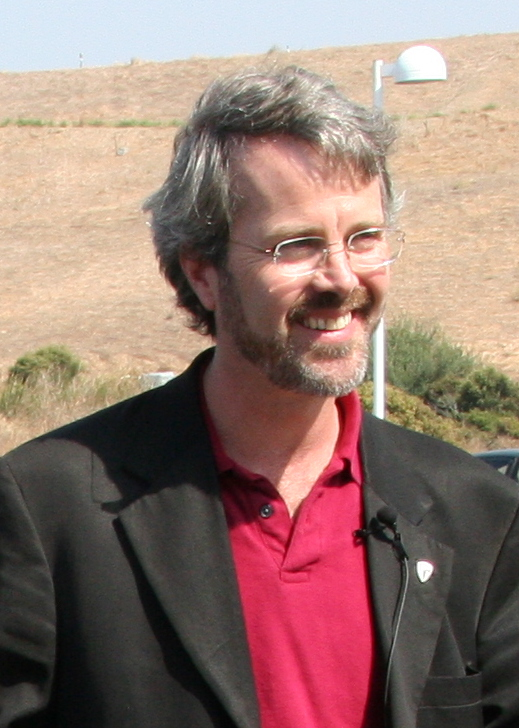
- Eberhard in 2006
- Born: Martin Forest Eberhard; 1960 (age 65–66); California, United States
- Education: University of Illinois Urbana-Champaign (BS, MS)
- Known for: Co-founder of Tesla

Martin Forest Eberhard (/ˈɛbərhɑːrd/; born 1960) is an American engineer and entrepreneur who co-founded Tesla, Inc. (then Tesla Motors) with Marc Tarpenning in July 2003, and was its original CEO until late 2007.

== Early life and education ==
Born in California, Martin Forest Eberhard grew up in Kensington, a community in the Berkeley Hills. He received a B.S. in computer engineering from the University of Illinois Urbana-Champaign in 1982 and an M.S. in electrical engineering from the same school in 1984.

== Career ==
=== Early years ===
Eberhard began his career as an electrical engineer at Wyse Technology, where he designed the WY-30 ASCII computer terminal as his first product. Eberhard co-founded Network Computing Devices in 1987, where he was chief engineer through its IPO in 1992.

In 1996, Eberhard founded NuvoMedia with Marc Tarpenning, where they developed the Rocket eBook, one of the first dedicated e-book readers. Eberhard was chairman and CEO until NuvoMedia’s acquisition by Gemstar in 2000.

=== Tesla Motors ===
Eberhard's interest in sports cars, concern about the dependence on oil imports, and global warming led him to consider electric cars. His experience sourcing lithium-ion cells for NuvoMedia's e-book reader also influenced the idea. Eberhard found out about and attempted to purchase a prototype EV sports car called the AC Propulsion tzero. He provided some financial and technical support in the conversion of the tzero to lithium-ion batteries. Eberhard then tried to convince AC Propulsion founder Alan Cocconi to turn the tzero into a production car. When Cocconi declined, Eberhard and Tarpenning founded Tesla Motors in Menlo Park, California, in 2003, with Eberhard as CEO.

Eberhard and Tarpenning had observed a common sight in the driveways of the wealthy suburb of Palo Alto, California: a conspicuously efficient Toyota Prius parked next to a high-end sportscar or luxury car such as a Porsche, a BMW or a Lexus. They concluded that affluent, environmentally minded buyers who also wanted a high-performance car could be an early market for an electric sports car.

Eberhard’s guiding principles were:

1) An electric car should not be a compromise. With the right technology choices, it is possible to build electric cars that are actually better cars than their competition.

2) Battery technology is key to a successful electric car. Lithium-ion batteries are not only suitable for automotive use; they are game-changing, making decent driving range a reality.

3) If designed right, electric cars can appeal to even the most serious car enthusiast, as electric drive is capable of seriously outperforming internal combustion engines.

Eberhard received the second Founders Series Tesla Roadster.

On November 30, 2007, Tesla released a press release titled "Martin Eberhard, Co-founder of Tesla Motors, to Transition to Advisory Board." Fortune magazine reported in December 2007 that chairman Elon Musk had asked Eberhard to leave. Musk stated in an interview that it was not due to ideological differences, but that he did not see a role for Eberhard. In December 2007, The New York Times reported a Tesla statement explaining that the co-founder and former chief executive, Martin Eberhard, "has transitioned from the board of directors and executive management of the company to the advisory board."

Eberhard noted that while he had signed a non-disclosure agreement with Tesla, "so I must, by contract, be a bit careful about how I word things", he was not happy with the transition. In his since-deleted Tesla Founders Blog, Eberhard criticized Tesla layoffs, which he labeled a "stealth bloodbath".

In June 2009, Eberhard brought a lawsuit against Elon Musk for libel, slander, and breach of contract, alleging that Musk pushed him out of the company, publicly disparaged him, and compromised Tesla's financial health. In August 2009, Eberhard dropped the lawsuit for undisclosed reasons. In September 2009, Tesla confirmed the settlement, but did not provide further details.

In a 2021 interview with CNBC, Eberhard said he was still a Tesla shareholder and supported the company.

=== Volkswagen ===
In 2010, Eberhard confirmed to Autoblog Green that he was doing work with German automaker Volkswagen, but no further details were provided.

=== inEVit and SF Motors ===
In September 2016, Eberhard founded stealth-mode startup inEVit in a bid to supply major OEMs with electric drivetrains and power storage solutions.

SF Motors (now Seres) acquired inEVit in October 2017. Eberhard was chief innovation officer until leaving in July 2018.

=== Tiveni ===
In 2019 Eberhard founded Tiveni, which sought to make "intelligent EV battery systems". Tiveni's IP portfolio was acquired by American Battery Solutions in September 2022.

== Awards and honors ==
- In 2015, Eberhard was inducted into the University of Illinois College of Engineering Hall of Fame.
- In 2025, he was elected to the National Academy of Engineering.
