= Marc Tarpenning =

American technology entrepreneur (born 1964)

- Born: June 1, 1964 (age 62); Sacramento, California, U.S.
- Education: University of California, Berkeley (BA)
- Occupations: Engineer, entrepreneur
- Known for: Co-founder of Tesla
- Website: https://marctarpenning.com/

Marc Tarpenning (born June 1, 1964) is an American engineer and technology entrepreneur who co-founded Tesla with Martin Eberhard in 2003. He served as Tesla's chief financial officer (CFO) and later as vice president of electrical engineering.

== Early life ==
Marc Tarpenning was born in Sacramento, California, on June 1, 1964. He attended the University of California, Berkeley, and obtained a B.A. degree in computer science in 1985.

== Career ==
After graduating from Berkeley, Tarpenning spent several years working for Textron in Saudi Arabia. Tarpenning then developed software and firmware products for several companies, including Seagate Technology and Bechtel, and later served as vice president of engineering at Packet Design, a network technology company. In 1996, Tarpenning and Eberhard founded NuvoMedia, which released an early e-book reader, the Rocket eBook, in 1998. In 2000, Gemstar–TV Guide International acquired NuvoMedia for $187 million.

In 2003, Tarpenning and Martin Eberhard collaborated again and founded Tesla Motors (now Tesla Inc.). The two co-founders funded the company themselves until February 2004, when Elon Musk led its $6.5 million Series A round and became chairman of the board. Tarpenning remained at Tesla as CFO and vice president of electrical engineering until 2008.

After leaving Tesla, Tarpenning became an adviser to several organizations, including UC Berkeley's Sutardja Center for Entrepreneurship & Technology and its SkyDeck accelerator, and joined the venture capital firm Spero Ventures in 2019.
