= Camille Jenatzy =

Belgian racing driver (1868–1913)

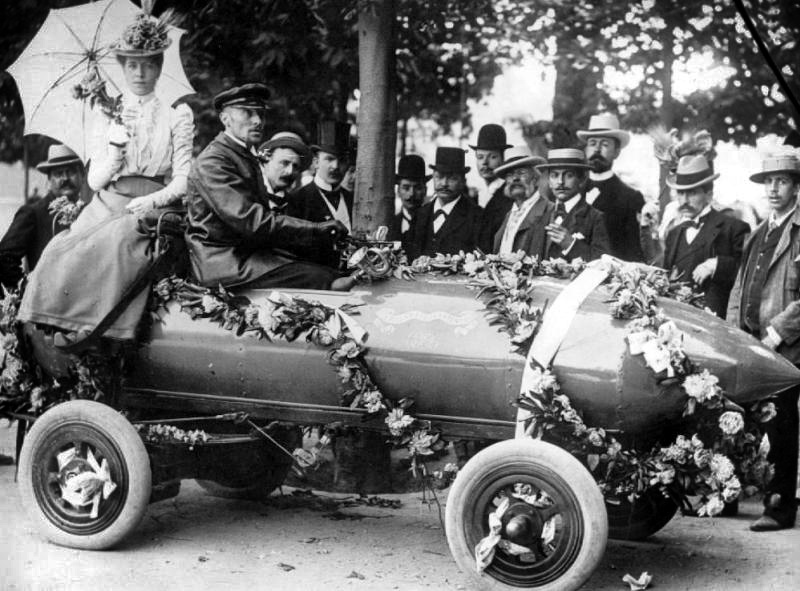
Picture of Camille Jenatzy and his wife riding the Jamais Contente vehicle.

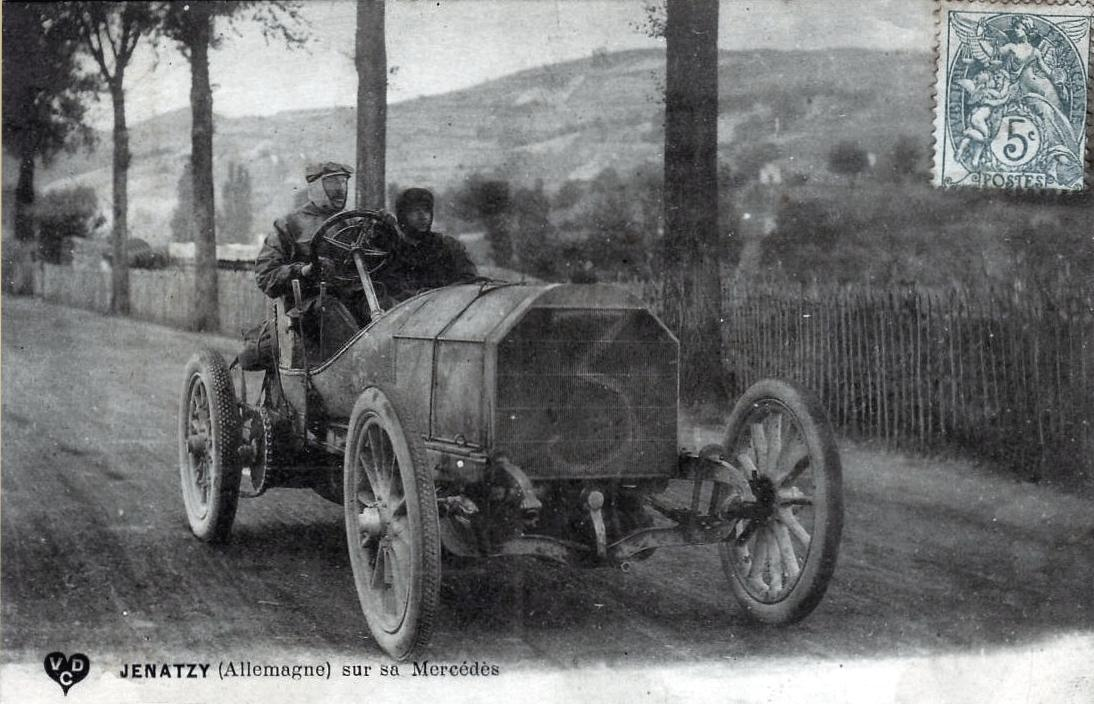
Jenatzy driving a Mercedes

Camille Jenatzy (1868, Schaerbeek – 8 December 1913, Habay la Neuve) was a Belgian race car driver. He is known for breaking the land speed record three times and being the first man to break the 100 km/h barrier. He was nicknamed Le Diable Rouge ("The Red Devil") after the colour of his beard.

== Record setting ==
On 17 January 1899 at Achères, Yvelines near Paris, France, he reached the speed of 66.66 km/h (41.42 mph) over one kilometre, driving a CGA Dogcart. That same day, the record was broken by Gaston de Chasseloup-Laubat, topped on 27 January 1899 when Jenatzy achieved 80.35 km/h (49.93 mph). This record was again broken by Chasseloup-Laubat, who applied rudimentary streamlining to his Jeantaud. Jenatzy replied with his third land speed record on 29 April 1899, reaching 105.88 km/h (65.79 mph) in the electric CITA Nº 25 La Jamais Contente, the first purpose-designed land speed racer, and the first record over 100 km/h (62 mph). In 1902, he lost the land speed record to Léon Serpollet.

Jenatzy won the 1903 Gordon Bennet Cup in Athy, Ireland, at the wheel of a Mercedes. Auto racing was a deadly sport at the time and at some point Jenatzy predicted he would die in a Mercedes.

== Death ==
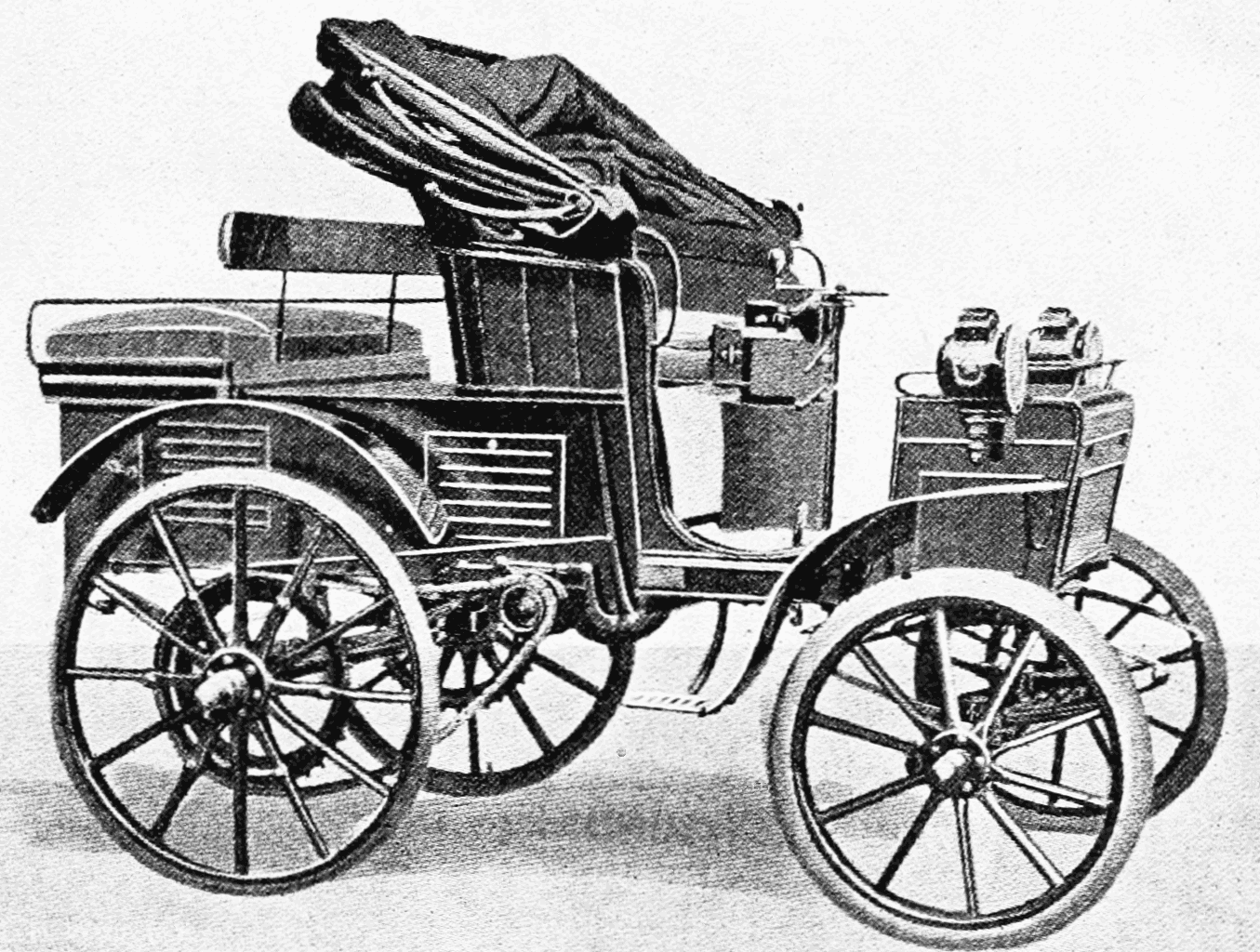
Jenatzy dog phaeton electric automobile circa 1900

Jenatzy died in 1913 in a hunting accident. He went behind a bush and made animal noises as a prank on his friends who were hunting with him. Alfred Madoux, director of the journal L'Etoile Belge, fired, believing it was a wild animal. When they realised it was Jenatzy, they rushed him to hospital by car; he bled to death en route, fulfilling his own prophecy he would die in a Mercedes. He is buried at the Laeken Cemetery in Brussels.
