= Achères, Yvelines =

Achères
- Commune
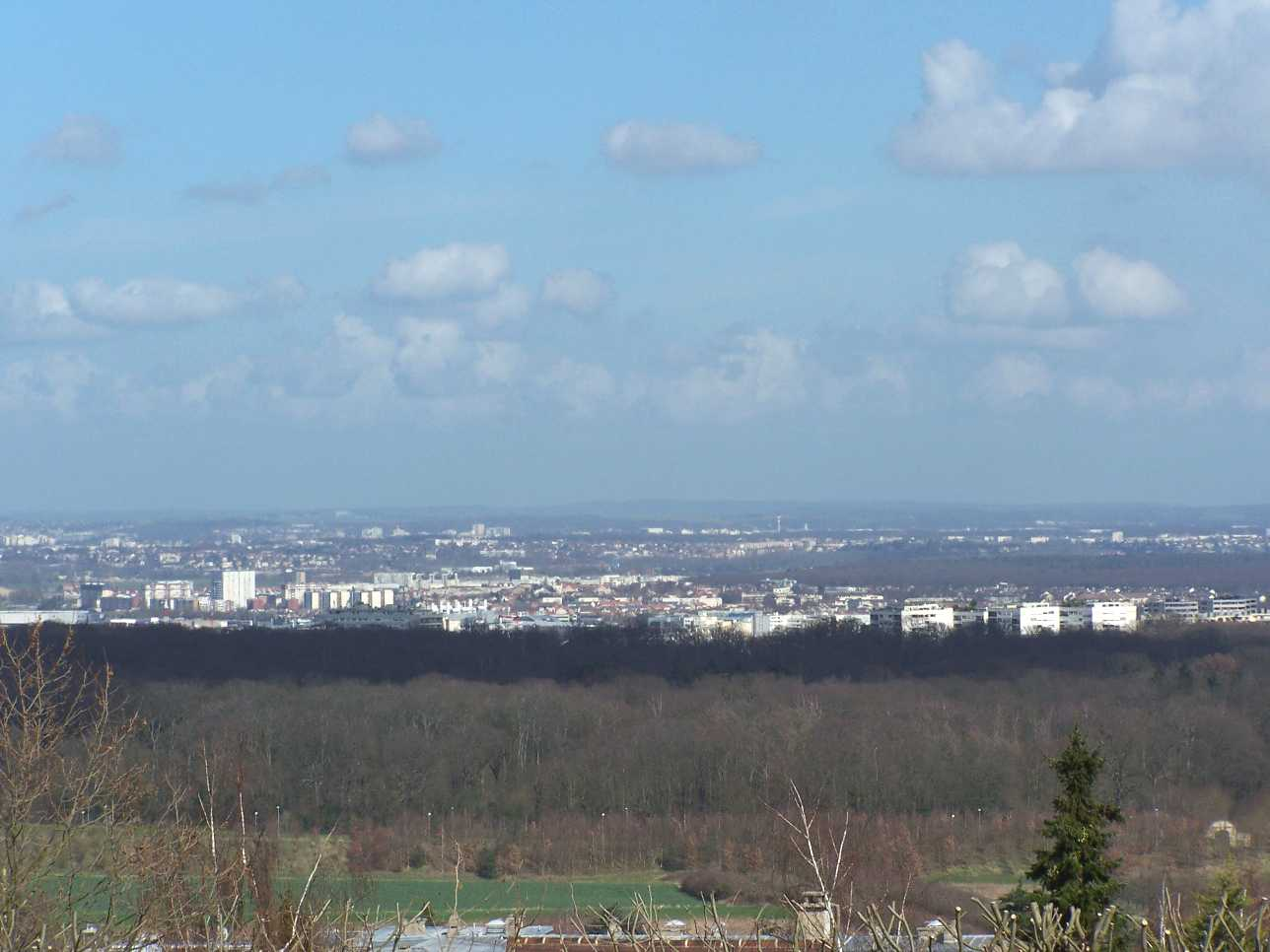
- A general view of Achères

- Coat of arms

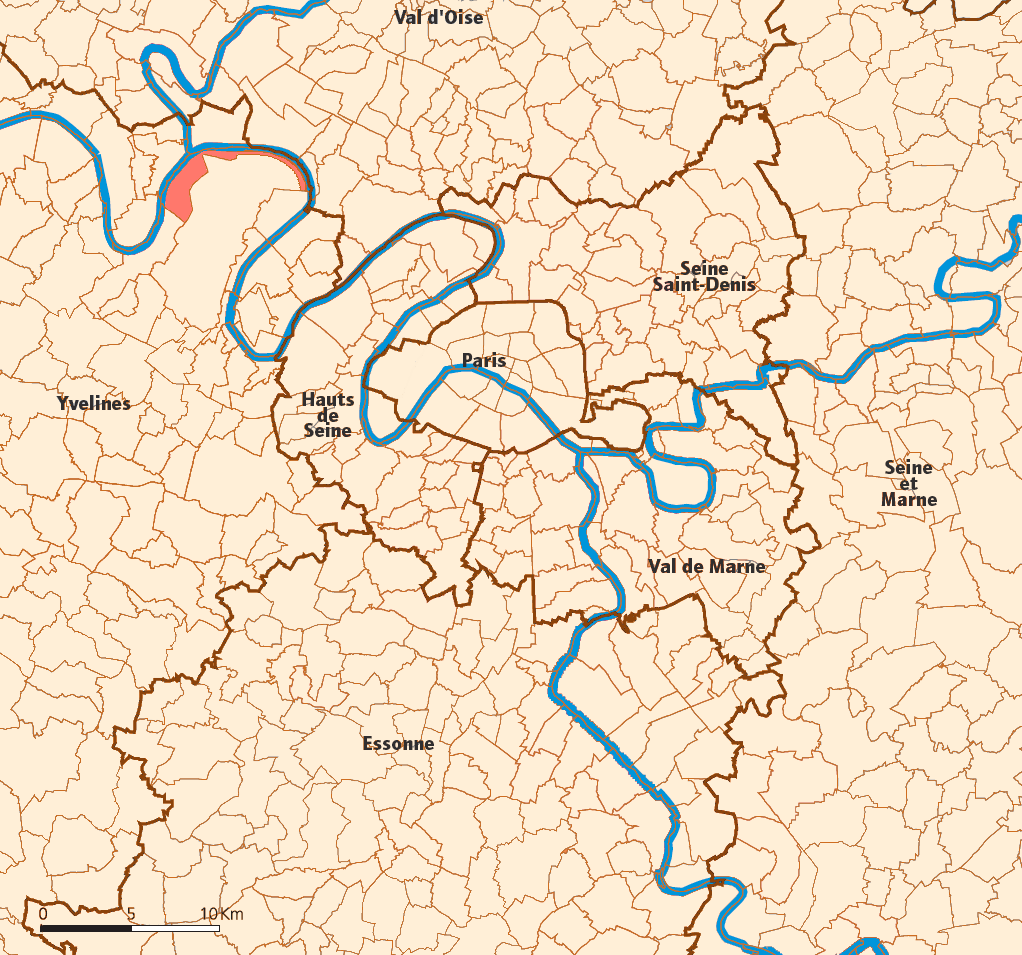
- Location (in red) within Paris inner and outer suburbs
- Location of Achères
- Location within France Location within Île-de-France (region)
- Coordinates: 48°57′37″N 2°04′06″E
- Country: France
- Region: Île-de-France
- Department: Yvelines
- Arrondissement: Saint-Germain-en-Laye
- Canton: Poissy
- Intercommunality: Grand Paris Seine et Oise

Government
  - Mayor (2020–2026): Marc Honoré
- Area^{1}: 9.44 km^{2} (3.64 sq mi)
- Highest elevation: 32 m (105 ft)
- Lowest elevation: 18 m (59 ft)
- Population (2023): 22,241
  - Density: 2,360/km^{2} (6,100/sq mi)
- Time zone: UTC+01:00 (CET)
  - Summer (DST): UTC+02:00 (CEST)
- INSEE/Postal code: 78005 /78260
- ^{1} French Land Register data, which excludes lakes, ponds, glaciers > 1 km^{2} (0.386 sq mi or 247 acres) and river estuaries.

Achères (French pronunciation: [aʃɛʁ]) is a commune in the Yvelines department in north-central France. It is located 23.7 km (14.7 mi) from the centre of Paris.

The commune of Achères lies on the south bank of the Seine in a loop of the river, on the edge of the Forest of Saint-Germain-en-Laye. It borders Saint-Germain-en-Laye and Poissy on the south, Andrésy and Carrières-sous-Poissy on the west, Conflans-Sainte-Honorine and Herblay on the north, and Maisons-Laffitte and La Frette-sur-Seine on the east.

== History ==
=== Land speed records ===
Between 18 December 1898 and 29 April 1899 the first six world land speed records were set in Achères, as Gaston de Chasseloup-Laubat and Camille Jenatzy alternately raised the world record speed from 39.245 miles per hour (63.159 km/h) to 65.792 miles per hour (105.882 km/h).

Gaston de Chasseloup-Laubat drove his electric powered Jeantaud, while Camille Jenatzy used the electric car, built by the de: Compagnie Générale des Transports Automobiles (CITA), Nº 25, La Jamais Contente, the first purpose-designed land speed racer, and set the first record over 100 km/h (60 mph).

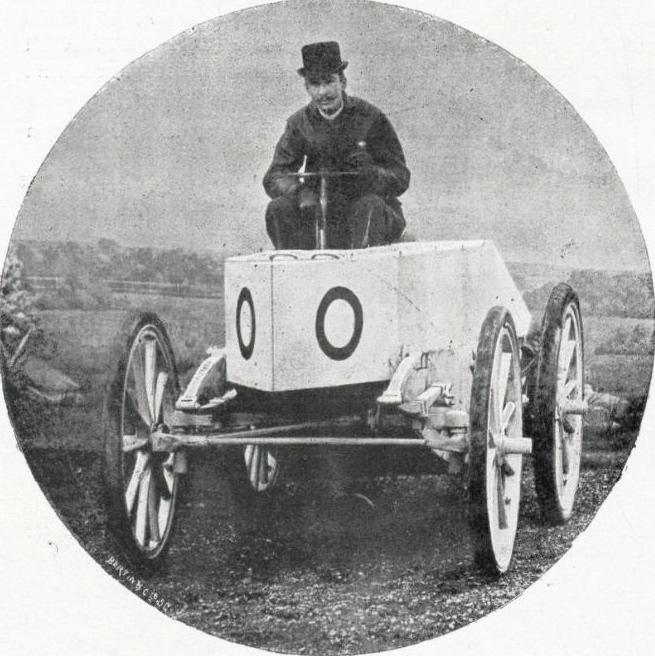
Count Gaston de Chasseloup-Laubat
in the Jeantaud Duc Profilée

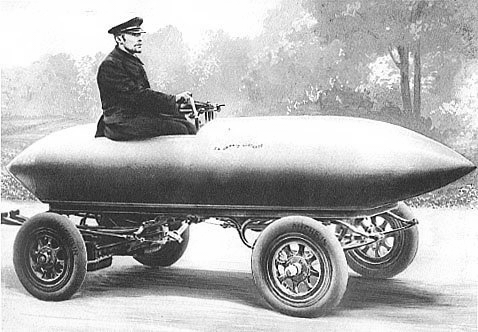
Camille Jenatzy in "La Jamais Contente" in 1899, the first automobile to reach 100 km/h.

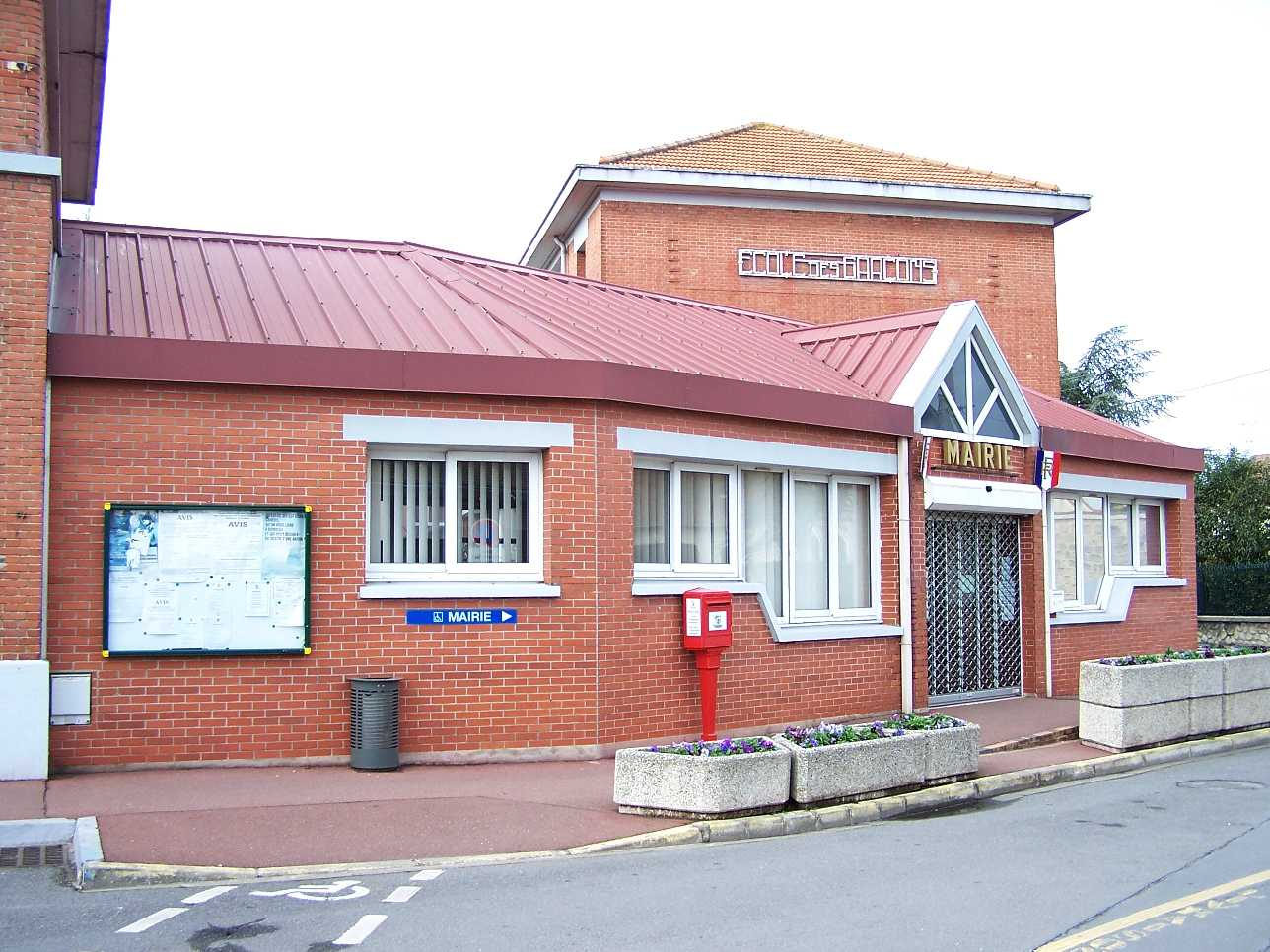
The Hôtel de Ville

The Hôtel de Ville was completed in 1995.

== Population ==
Inhabitants of Achères are called Achérois in French.

Historical population

Year	Pop.	±% p.a.
1793	349	—
1800	415	+2.51%
1806	416	+0.04%
1821	433	+0.27%
1831	479	+1.01%
1836	506	+1.10%
1841	508	+0.08%
1846	553	+1.71%
1851	585	+1.13%
1856	595	+0.34%
1861	660	+2.10%
1866	648	−0.37%
1872	715	+1.65%
1876	853	+4.51%
1881	874	+0.49%
1886	847	−0.63%
1891	801	−1.11%
1896	944	+3.34%
1901	1,158	+4.17%

Year	Pop.	±% p.a.
1906	1,260	+1.70%
1911	1,496	+3.49%
1921	1,703	+1.30%
1926	2,374	+6.87%
1931	3,109	+5.54%
1936	3,641	+3.21%
1946	3,936	+0.78%
1954	4,459	+1.57%
1962	5,390	+2.40%
1968	10,444	+11.66%
1975	15,172	+5.48%
1982	15,351	+0.17%
1990	15,039	−0.26%
1999	18,942	+2.60%
2007	19,789	+0.55%
2012	19,469	−0.33%
2017	21,017	+1.54%
2023	22,241	+0.95%

Source: EHESS and INSEE (1968–2023)

== Politics ==
=== Presidential Elections 2nd Round ===
Election	Winning candidate	Party	%
2017	Emmanuel Macron	EM	74.47
2012	François Hollande	PS	59.14
2007	Ségolène Royal	PS	53.44
2002	Jacques Chirac	RPR	84.91

== Transport ==
Achères is served by Achères-Ville and Achères–Grand-Cormier stations on Paris RER line, as well as Line L on the Transilien Paris-Saint-Lazare suburban rail.

By road, it is accessible from the N184, the Route de Poissy, and the D30.

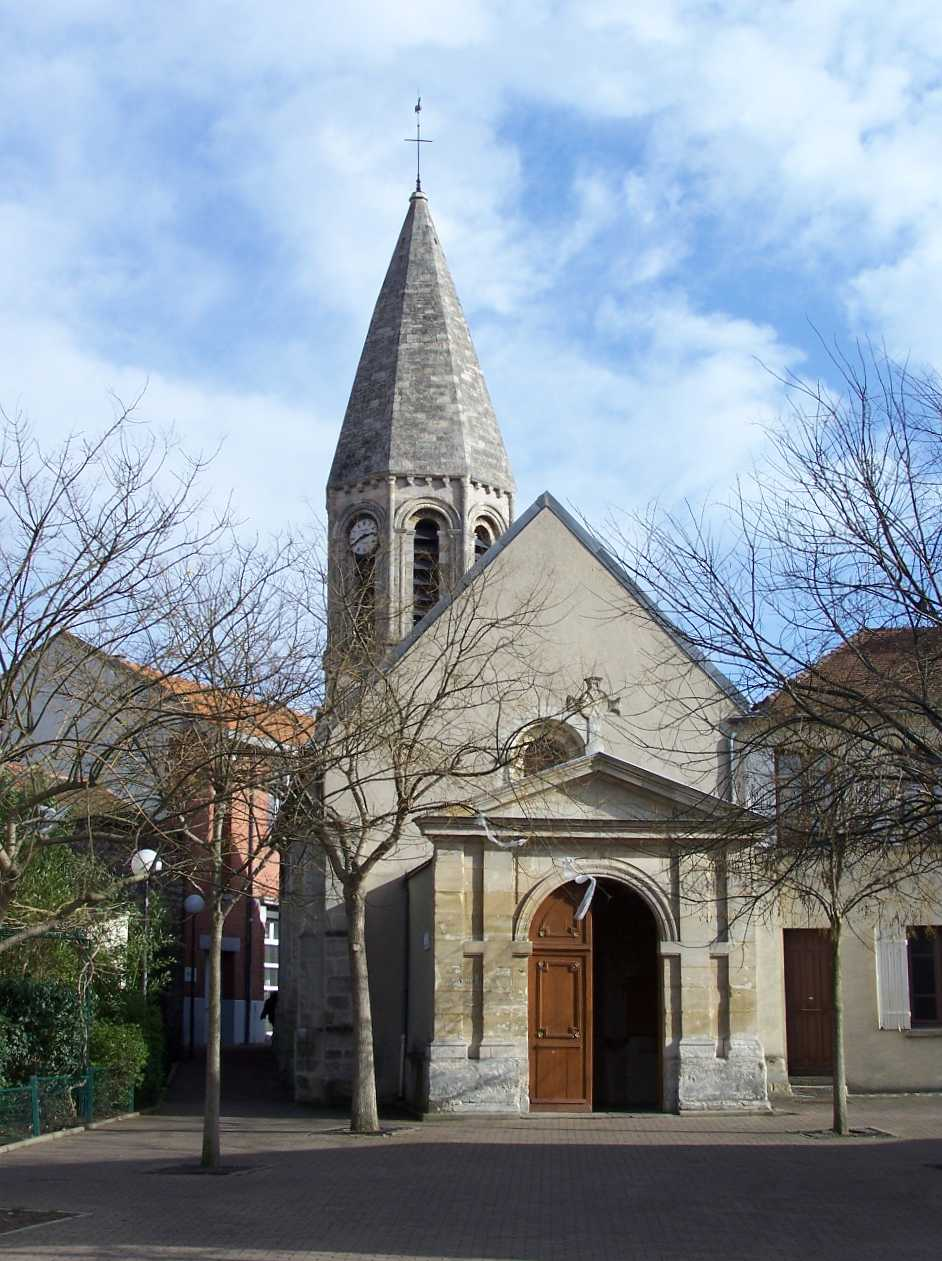
Achères church

== Twin towns – sister cities ==
Achères is twinned with:

- Amarante, Portugal
- Großkrotzenburg, Germany
- Stonehaven, Scotland, United Kingdom

== See also ==
- Communes of the Yvelines department
