= La Jamais Contente =

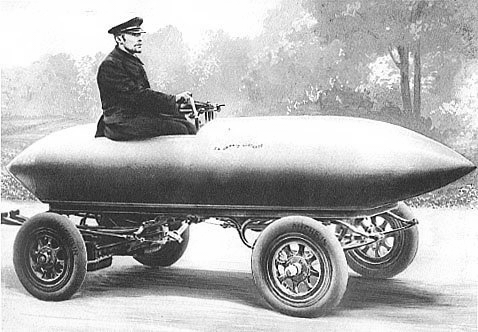
- Illustration of "La Jamais Contente", first automobile to reach 100 km/h in 1899

Overview
- Manufacturer: Compagnie Internationale des transports automobiles électriques
- Also called: The Never Satisfied
- Production: 1899

Powertrain
- Engine: Electrical

Dimensions
- Length: 3.80 m (12.5 ft)
- Width: 1.56 m (5 ft 1 in)
- Height: 1.40 m (4 ft 7 in)
- Curb weight: 1,450 kg (3,200 lb)

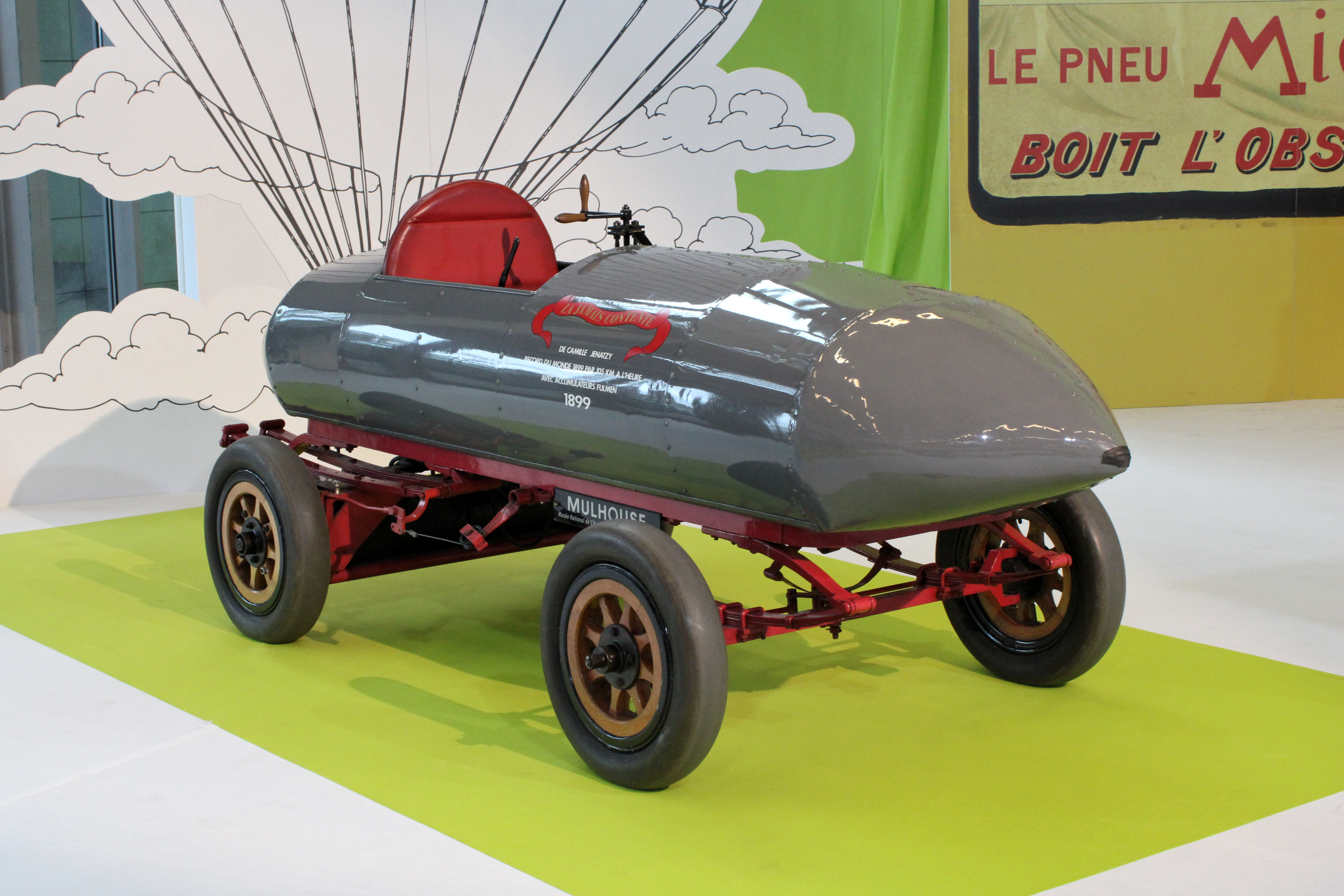
La Jamais Contente on display at the Paris Motor Show 2018

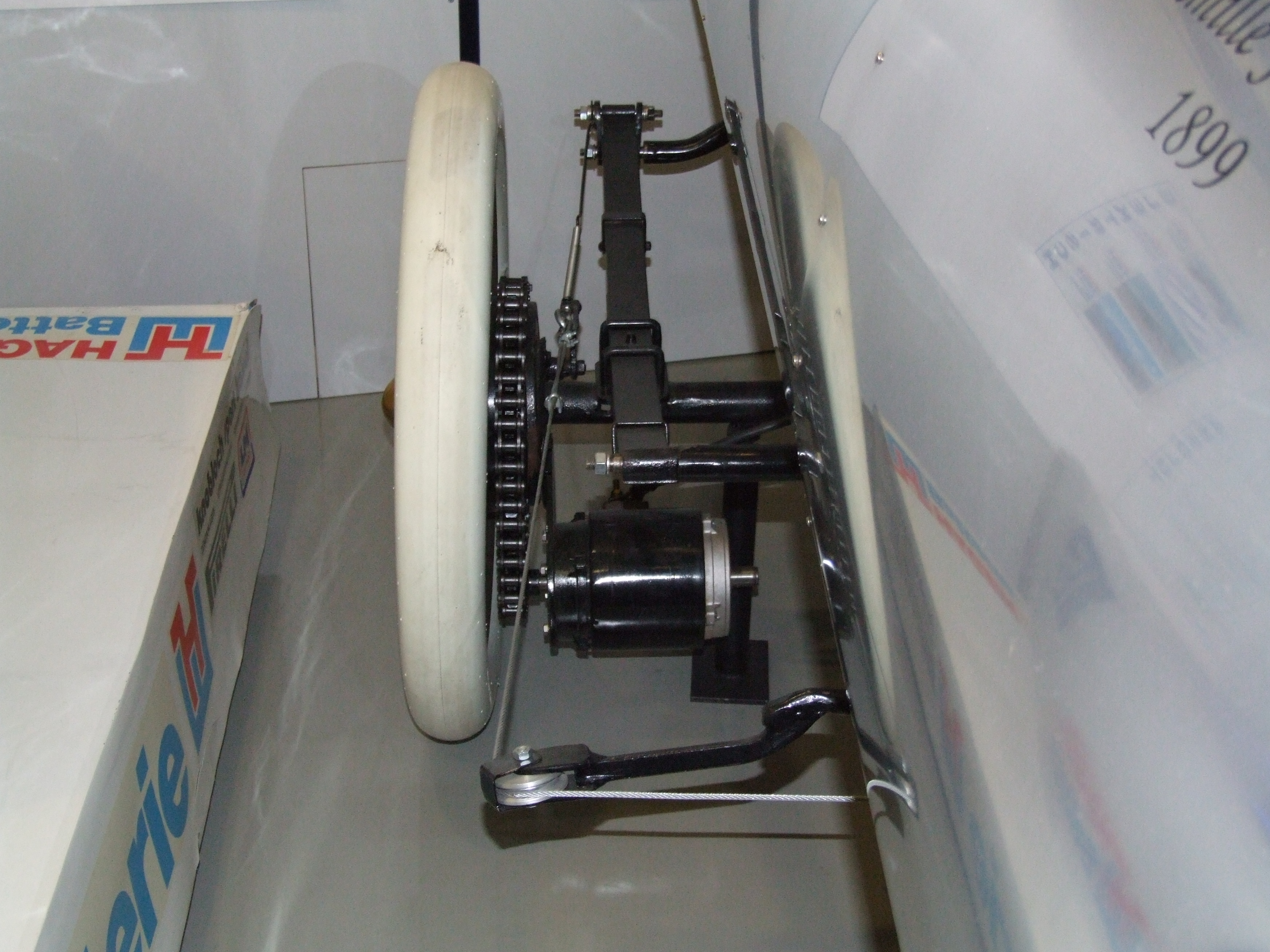
"La Jamais Contente" Detail: rear wheel, reconstruction of Museum Autovision, Altlußheim, Germany

La Jamais Contente (French pronunciation: [la ʒamɛ kɔ̃tɑ̃t]; English: The Never Contented) was the first road vehicle to go over 100 kilometres per hour (62 mph). It was a Belgian electric vehicle with a light-alloy torpedo-shaped bodywork and batteries. The high position of the driver and the exposed chassis underneath spoiled much of the aerodynamics. The light alloy, called partinium, is a mixture of aluminium, tungsten and magnesium.

The land speed record was established on 29 April or 1 May 1899 at Achères, Yvelines near Paris, France. The vehicle had two Postel-Vinay 25 kW motors, each driving the rear axle via a chain, running at 200 V and drawing 124 A each, for about 68 hp total, and was equipped with Michelin tires. The chassis was number 25.

Today, it is on display at the National Car and Tourism Museum in the royal Château de Compiègne in Compiègne.

== Driver ==
The vehicle was driven by the Belgian driver Camille Jenatzy. Camille was the son of Constant Jenatzy, a manufacturer of rubber products (rubber was still a novelty at the time). Camille had studied as an engineer, with an interest in electric-traction automobiles. He became known for his record-breaking speed runs and was nicknamed Le Diable Rouge ("The Red Devil") for the colour of his beard. He died in 1913, after being shot in a hunting accident.

== Motivation ==
Wishing to carve a place in the then promising Parisian electric carriage market, Jenatzy started a manufacturing plant, which would produce many electric carriages and trucks. He competed fiercely against the carriage-maker Jeantaud in publicity stunts to see which of them made the fastest vehicles. In order to ensure the triumph of his company, Jenatzy built a bullet-shaped prototype, conceived by the carriage-maker Rothschild in partinium (an alloy of laminated aluminum, tungsten and magnesium).

== Speed record ==
Jenatzy reached the speed of 105.882 kilometres per hour (65.792 mph), besting the previous record, held by Count Gaston de Chasseloup-Laubat driving a Jeantaud, who had attained 92.78 kilometres per hour (57.65 mph) on 4 March 1899. After this exploit, the gasoline-fuelled combustion engine would increasingly supplant electric technology for the next century.

The Jamais Contente is now on display at the automobile museum in Compiègne, France.

== See also ==
- Land speed record

Other land speed record electric automobiles

- Buckeye Bullet (2004)
- Keio University Eliica (2004)
- Venturi Jamais Contente (2010)
