= Charles Jeantaud =

French engineer

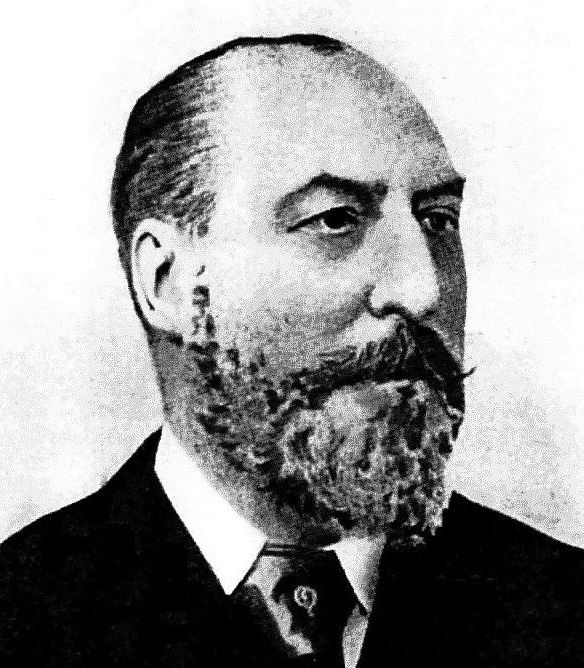
- Born: November 23, 1840; Limoges, France
- Died: November 30, 1906 (aged 66); Paris, France
- Occupation: Engineer

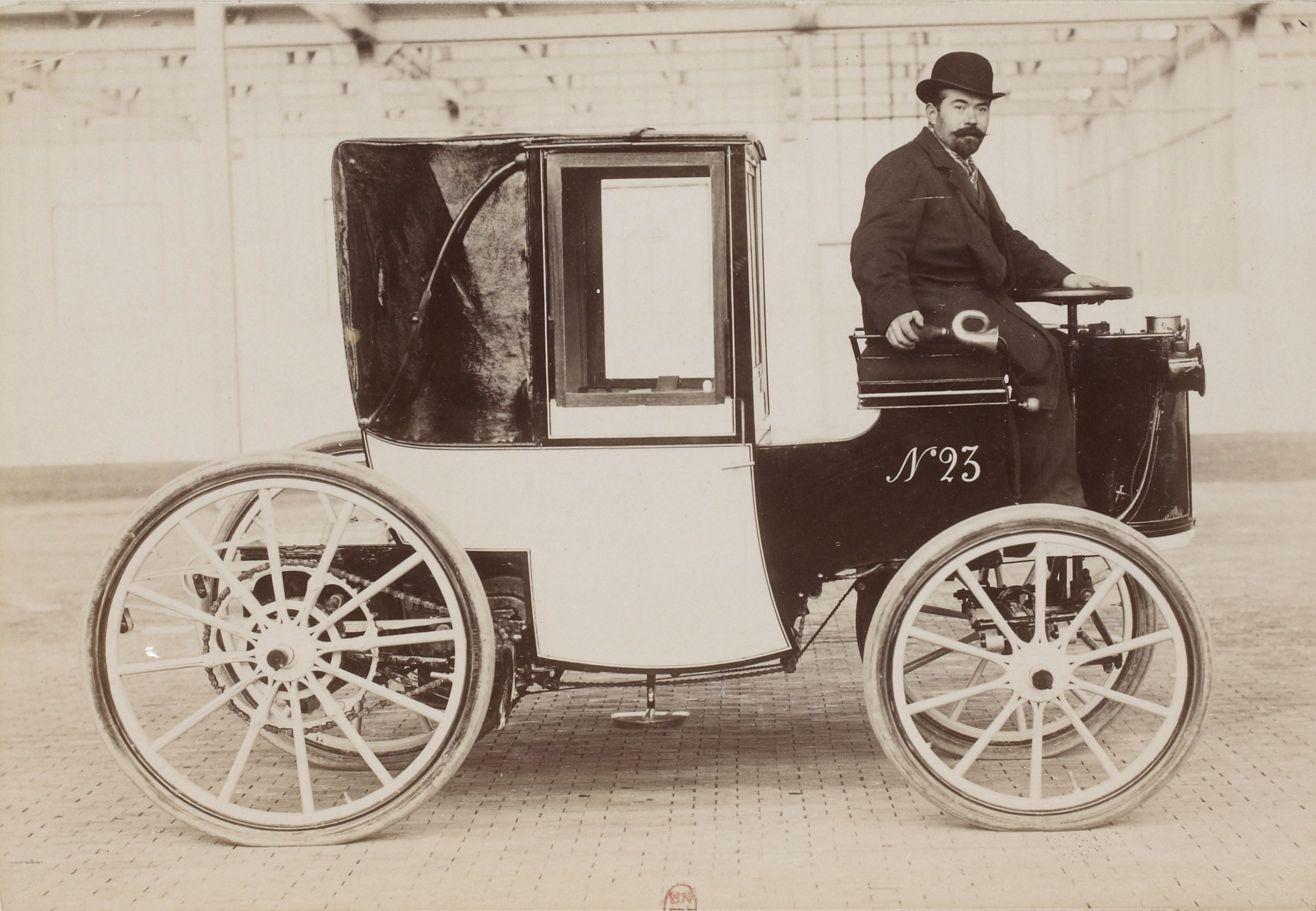
Jeantaud Milord, 1898

Charles Jeantaud (1840-1906) was a French engineer who invented the parallelogram steering linkage in 1878.

== Early life ==
He was born in Limoges, in what is now the Haute-Vienne department of central France.

== Career ==
In 1881 he built his first electric car, with help from Camille Alphonse Faure, who had built the first modern day car battery in 1881. The vehicle had a Gramme-design electric motor with a Fulmen-made battery. From 1893 to 1906 he built vehicles under the trademark Jeantaud in Paris.

== Personal life ==
He committed suicide in 1906.

== See also ==
- History of the electric vehicle
