= National Car and Tourism Museum =

Museum in France

Coordinates: 49.4192°N 2.8311°E

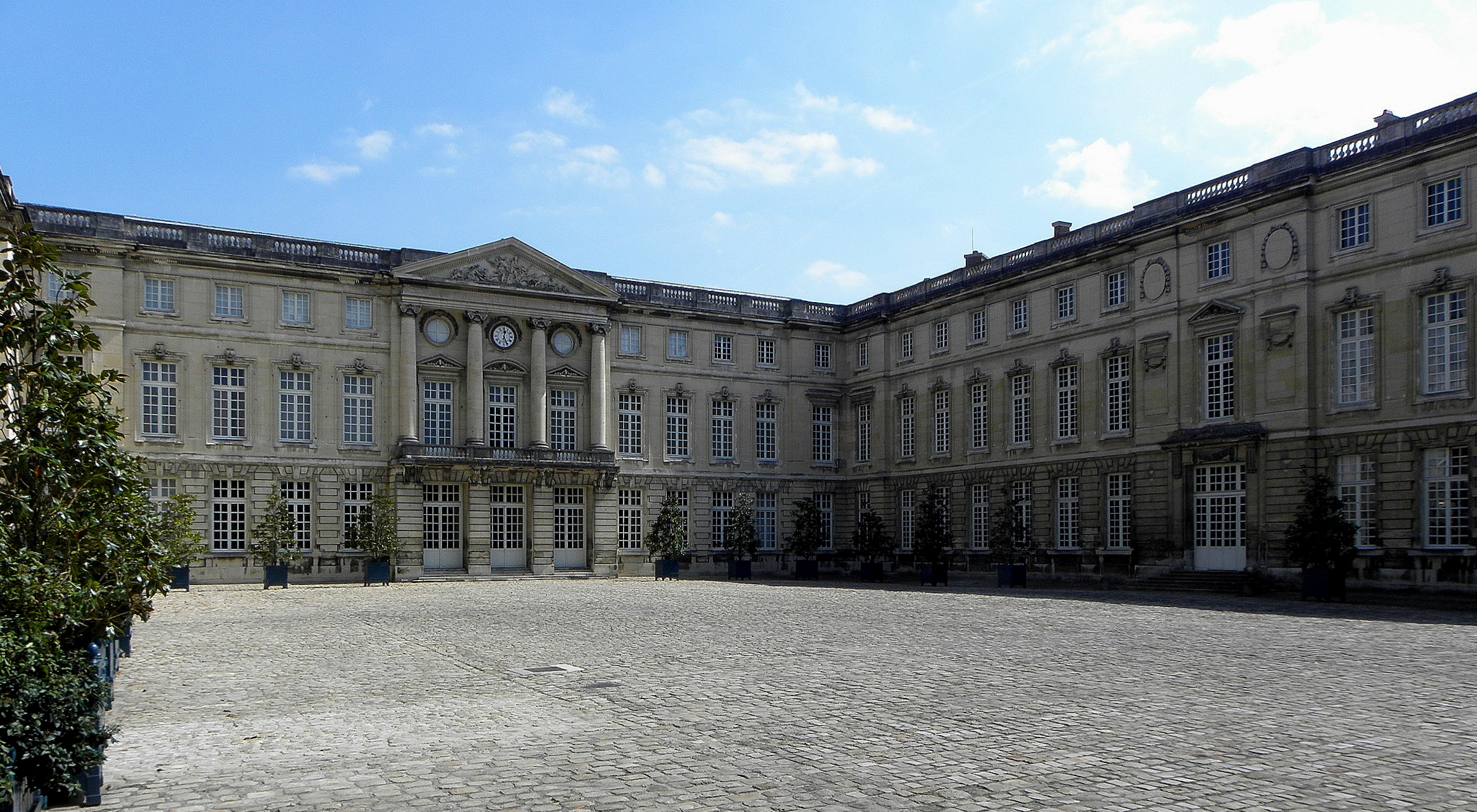
- Established: July 1, 1927
- Location: Compiègne, France
- Type: Transportation museum
- Website: chateaudecompiegne.fr/en/national-car-museum

The National Car and Tourism museum or Car museum in Compiègne (French: Musée national de la voiture (Note: The meaning of the French word "voiture", originally meaning "device used for transport", covers the range of vehicle, carriage, coach, wagon and motorcar.) et du tourisme) is a transportation museum located in the left wing of the Château de Compiègne, in the department of Oise.

== Overview ==
The National Car and Tourism museum was created on the initiative of the Touring Club de France association, in which the major coachbuilders at the world's fairs wanted to create a history of land locomotion and contribute to the preservation of horse-drawn and motorized heritage. It was inaugurated on July 1, 1927 by Édouard Herriot, Minister of Public Instruction and Fine Arts.

From its creation, the founders of this museum aimed to illustrate and recount a key moment in contemporary history, the transition from horse-drawn carriages to automobiles and its multiple impacts on human, social, economic, scientific, historical, artistic and industrial dimensions. (original in French)

— Maria-Anne Privat, General Curator of the Musée national de la voiture

The museum contains around 100 carriages, horse-drawn vehicles and porters dating from the 17th century to the 20th century, complemented by a collection of cycles and around 30 automobiles from the early days of the industry, as well as a collection of transport-related documents. Famous model automobiles in the collection include:

- La Mancelle, Amédée Bollée's steam car presented at the 1878 Paris Exposition
- Marquis de Broe's steam coach, bodied by Muhlbacker, weighing 7 tons
- Panhard & Levassor type A from 1891
- Double Phaëton Gobron-Brillié from 1898
- La Jamais Contente from 1899, an electric car that was the first to reach 100 km/h
- Renault Type A from 1899
- De Dion-Bouton Type AX from 1907
- Terrot-Cuzeau motorcycle from 1916
- Croisière noire Citroën car (1924)
Exhibits

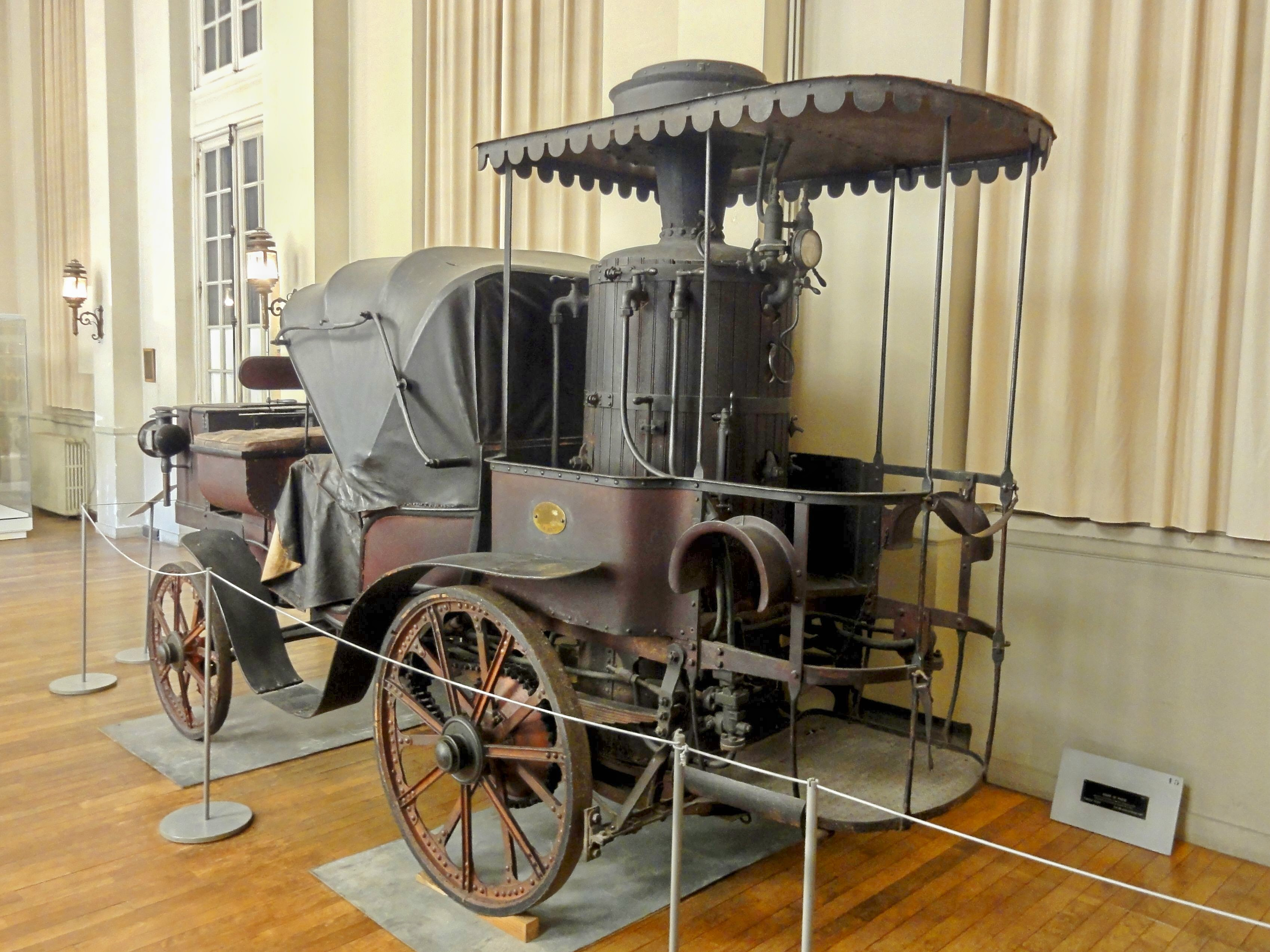
La Mancelle

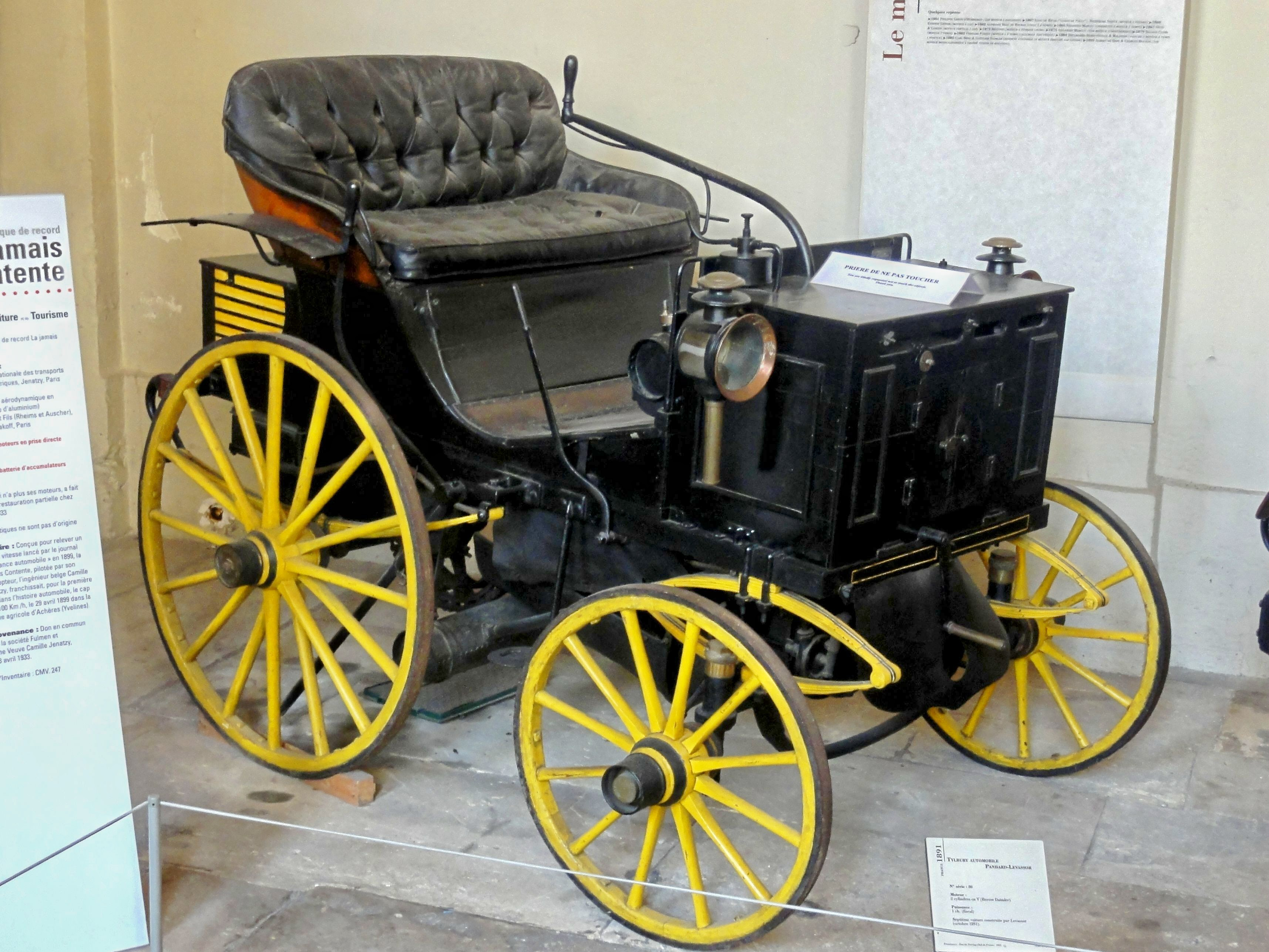
Panhard & Levassor type A.

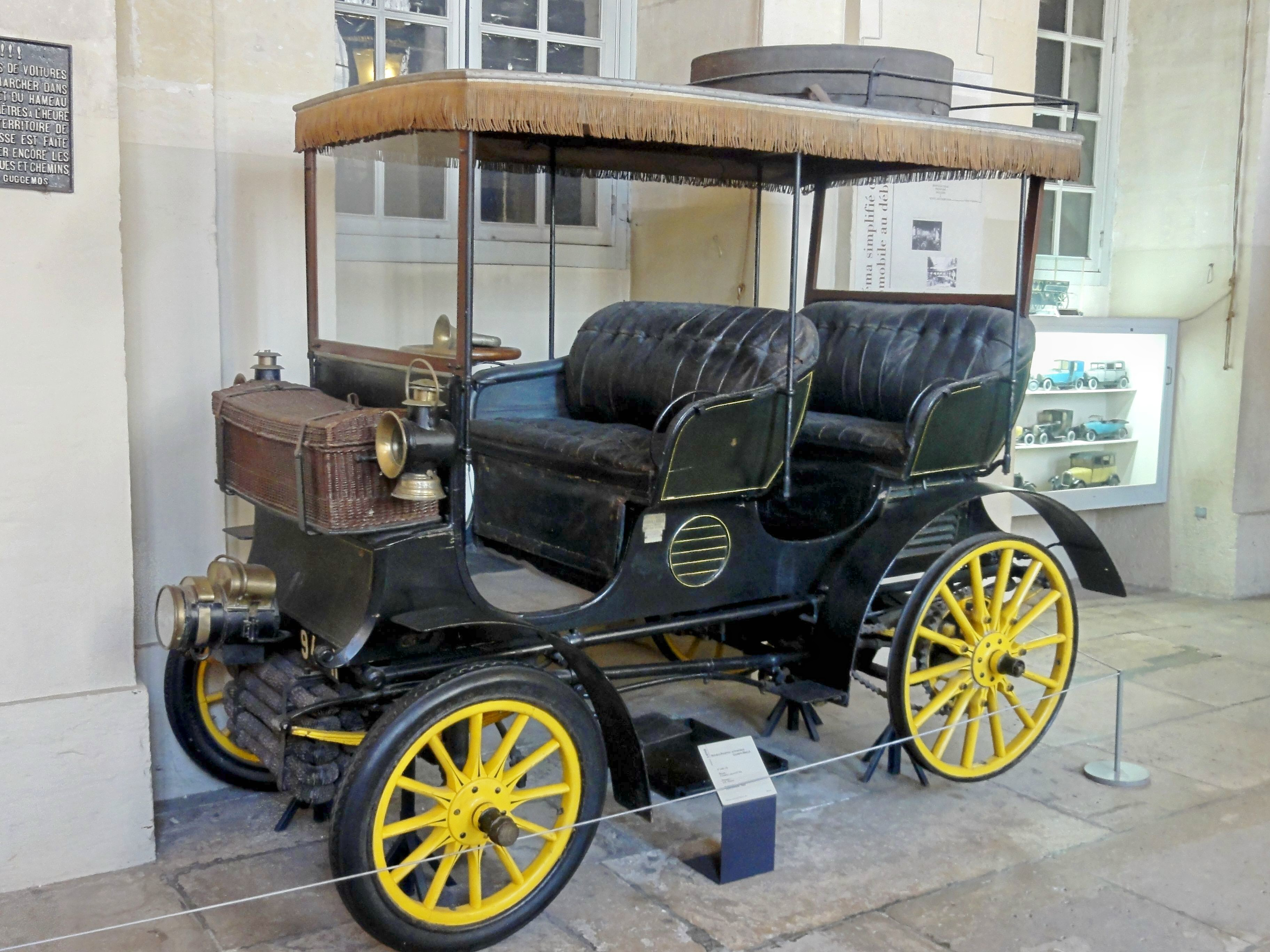
Double Phaëton Gobron-Brillié.

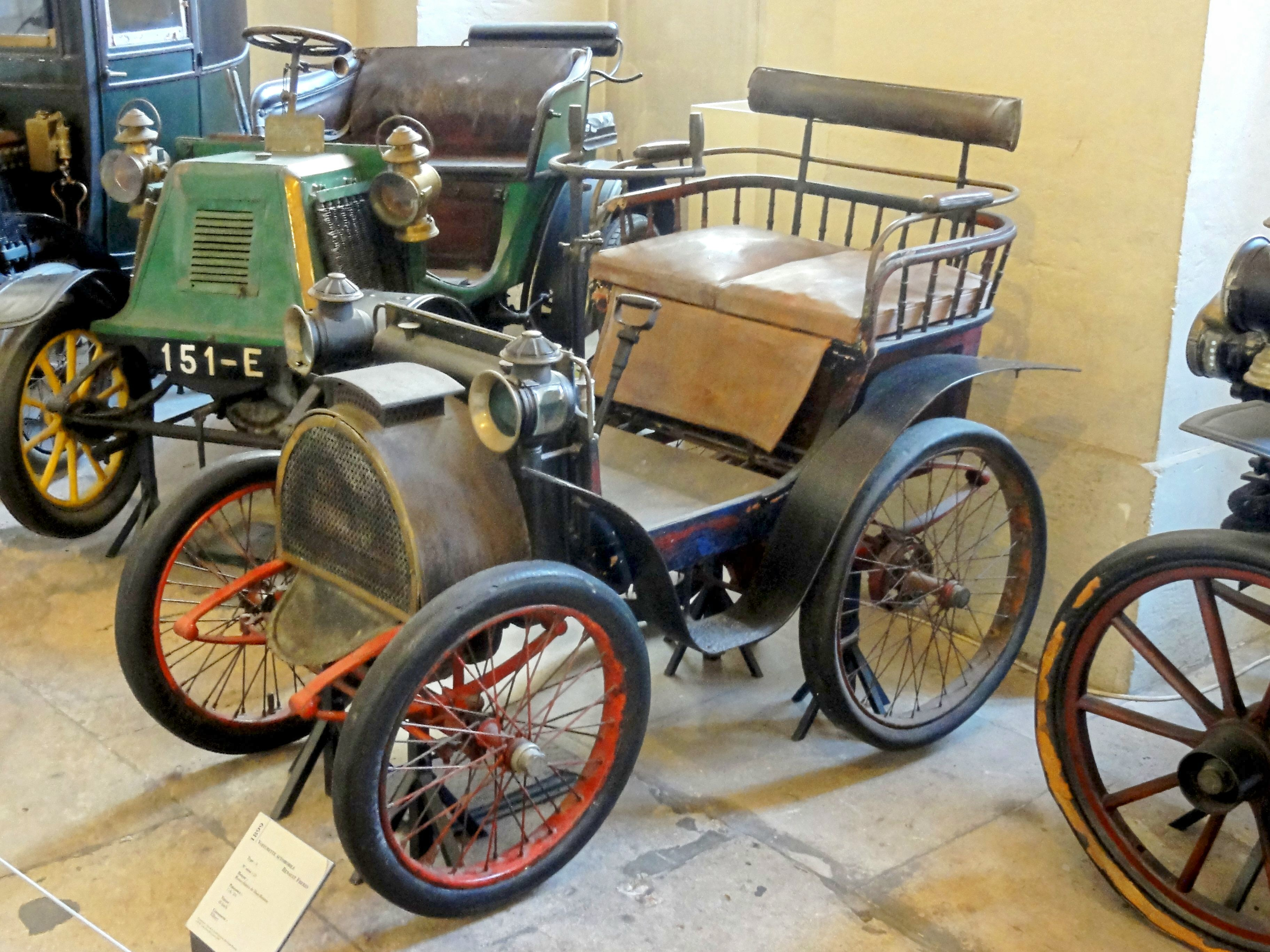
Renault type A

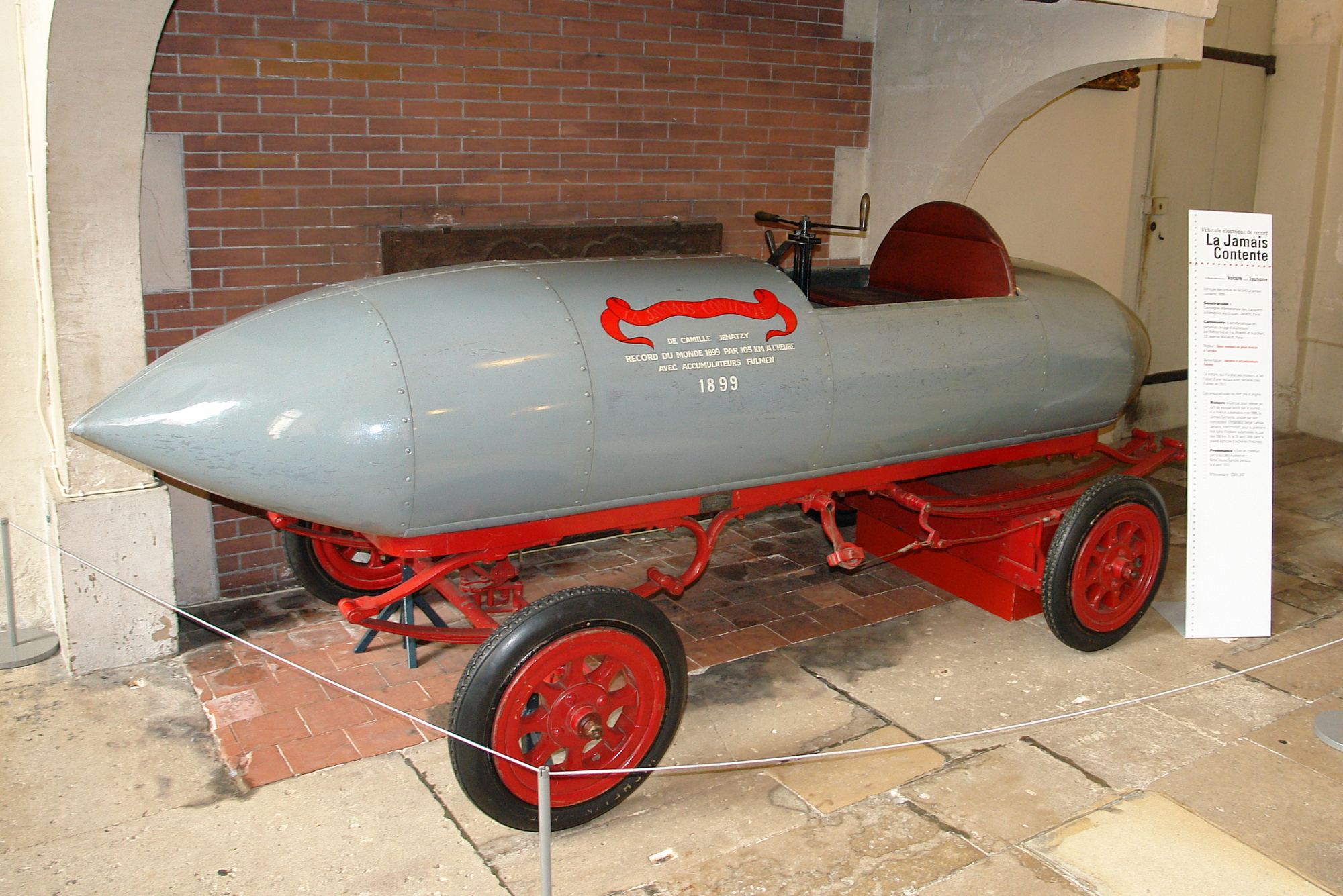
La Jamais Contente (1899)

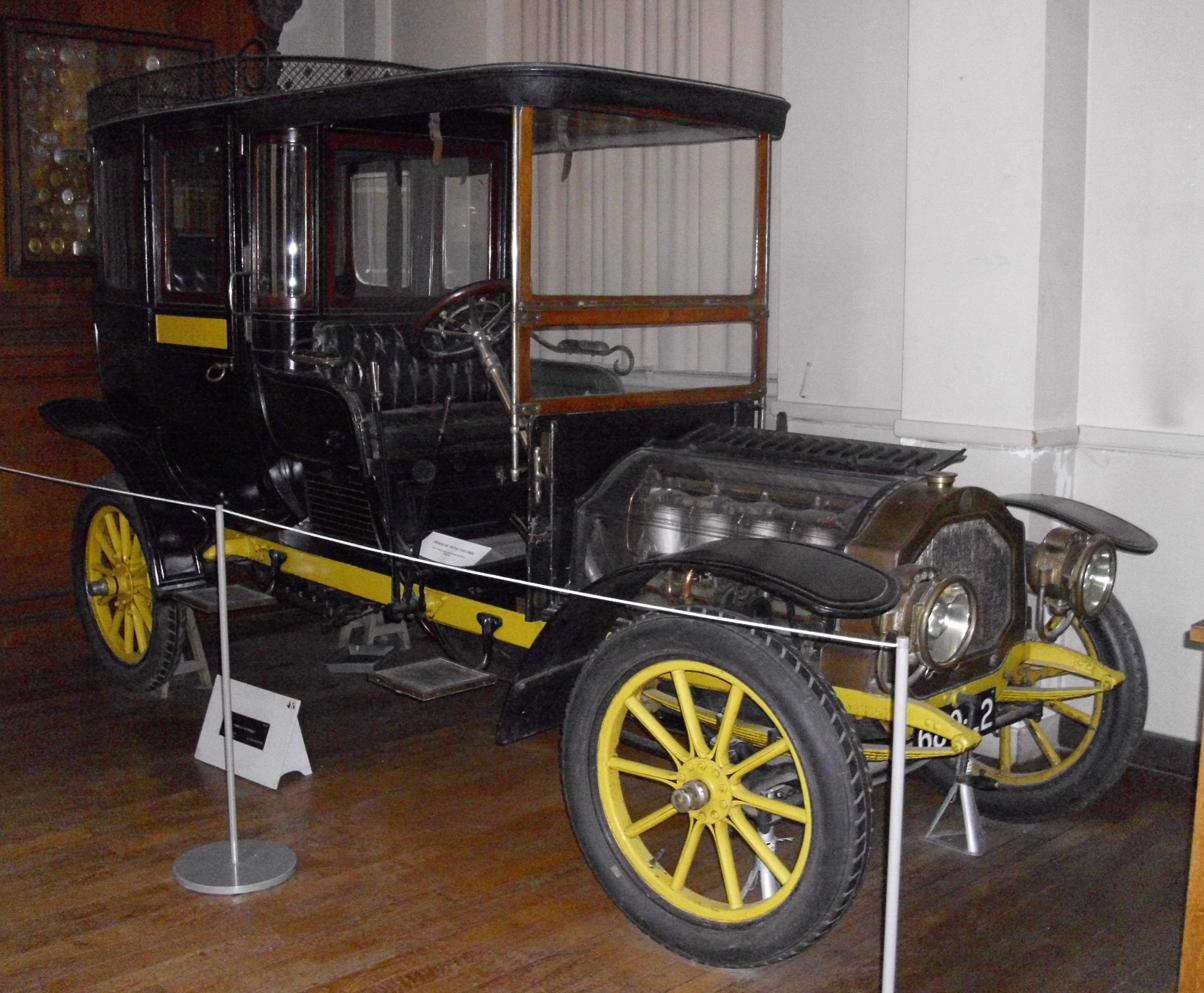
De Dion-Bouton Type AX

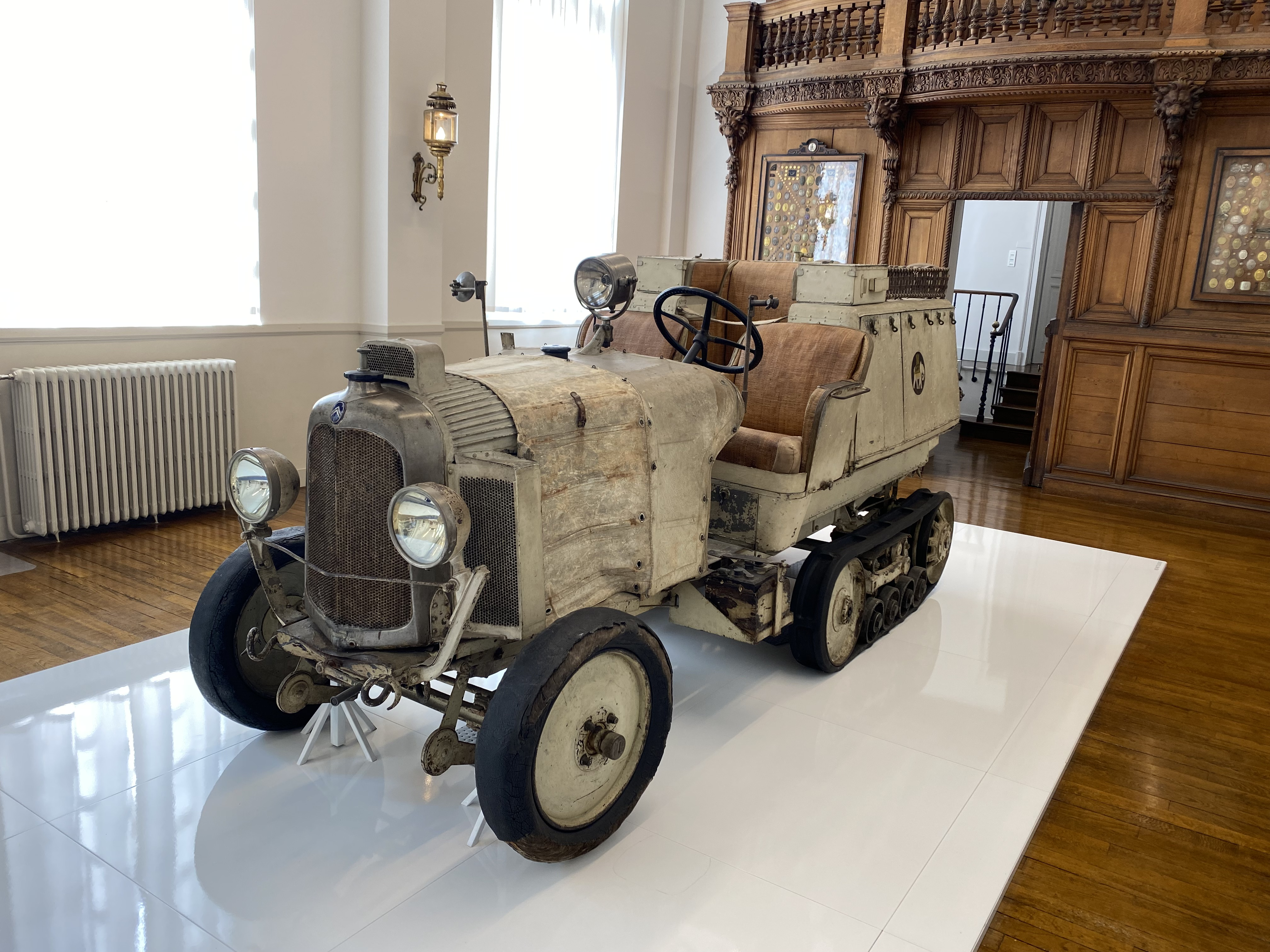
Autochenille Citroën L'Éléphant-à-la-Tour

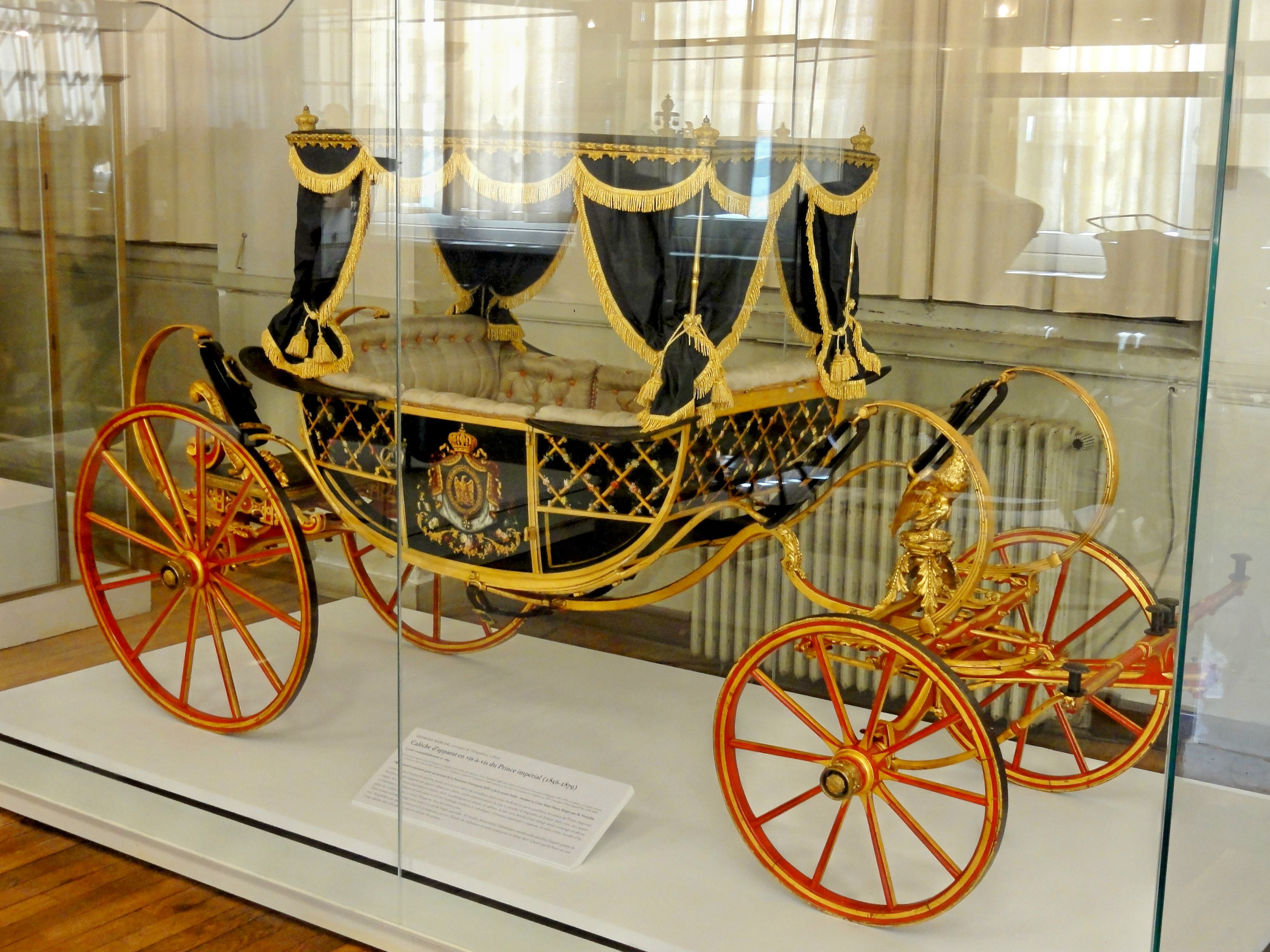
Ceremonial carriage for the Prince Imperial (1859)

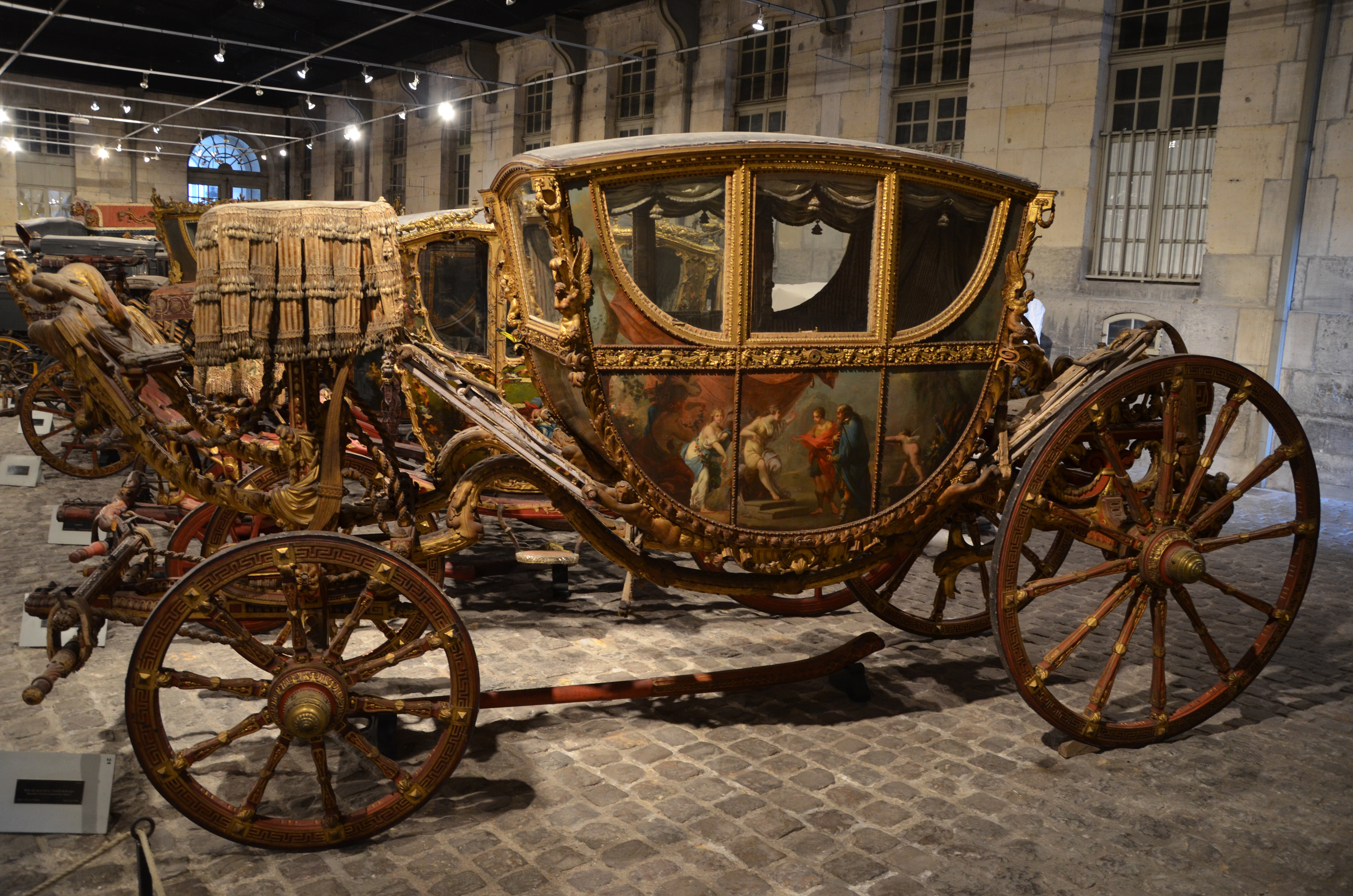
One of the elaborate carriages in the carriage room

== Activities ==
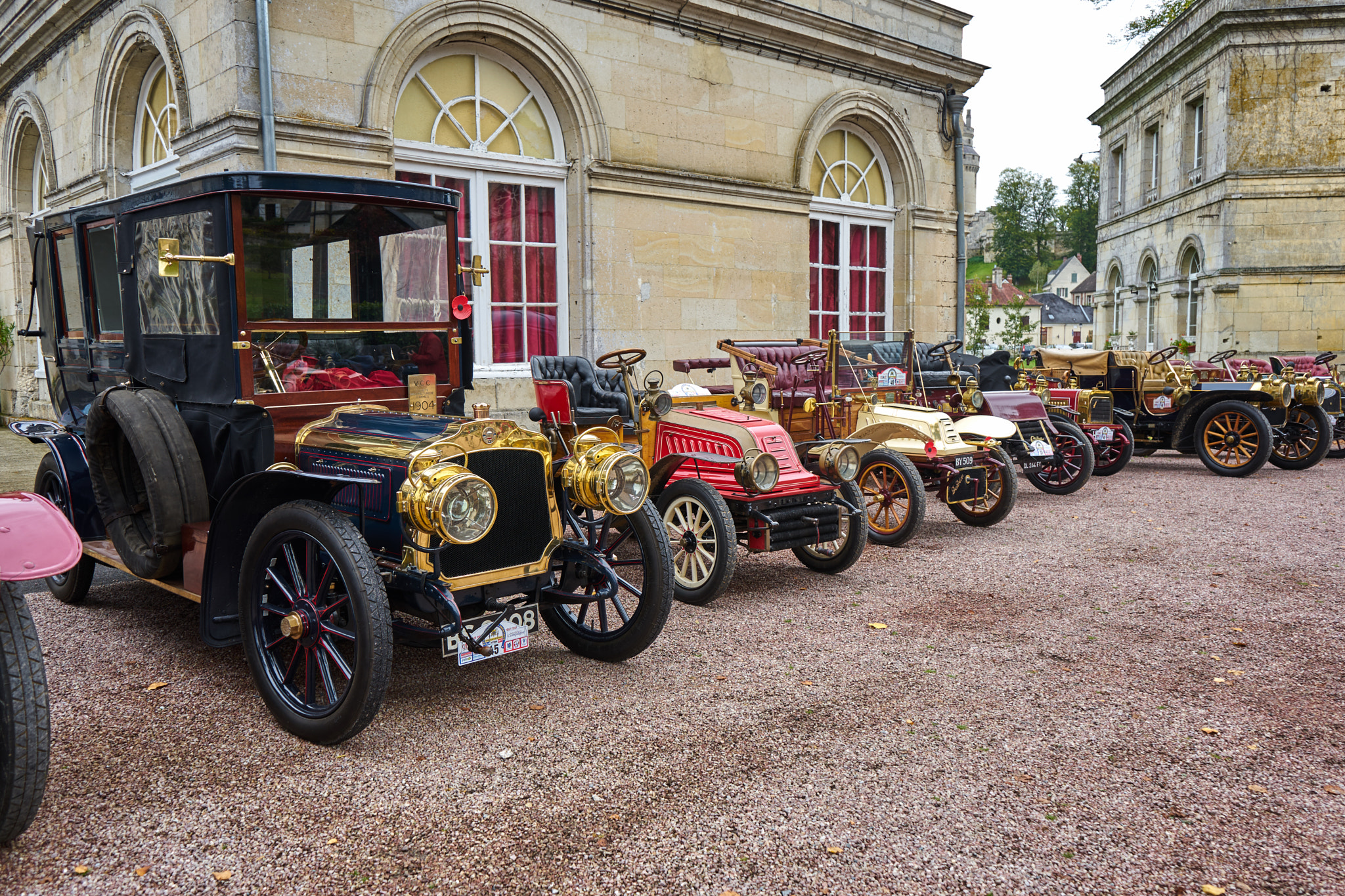
Veteran car rally, 2017

The Museum regularly lends pieces from its collection to the Paris Rétromobile show, as in 2009 with the exhibition of La Jamais Contente, and in 2016 with the exhibition of exceptional vehicles from the Palais de Compiègne.

Every year, the Rallye des ancêtres, a veteran car rally, brings together motor vehicles and motorcycles built before January 1, 1906 for a rally through the Oise region, starting at the Musée de Compiègne.
