= Hôtel de Ville, Achères =

Town hall in Achères, Yvelines, France

Hôtel de Ville
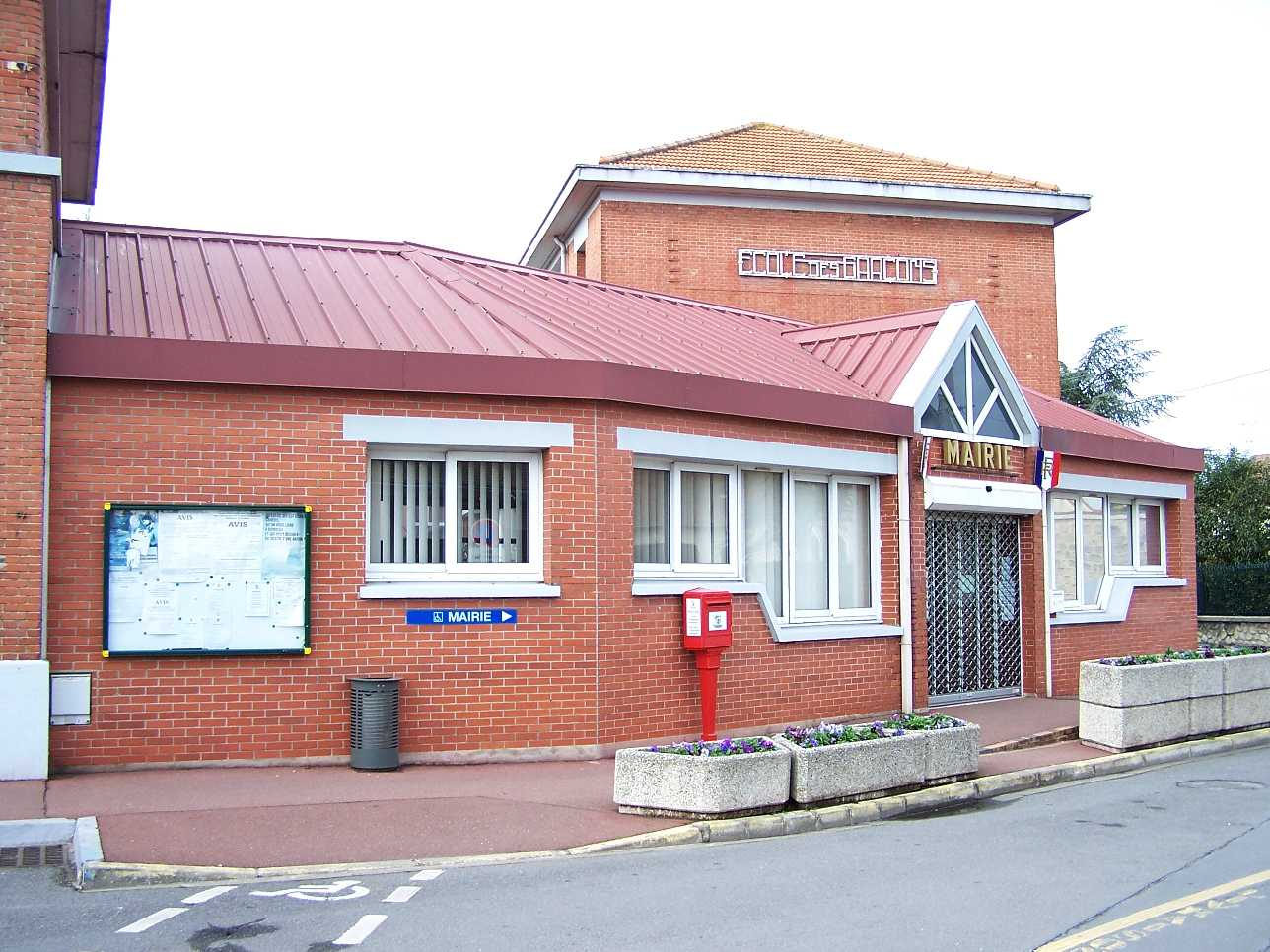
- The main frontage of the Hôtel de Ville in February 2007
- Interactive map of the Hôtel de Ville area

General information
- Type: City hall
- Architectural style: Modern style
- Location: Achères, France
- Coordinates: 48.9607°N 2.0701°E
- Completed: 1995

The Hôtel de Ville (French pronunciation: [otɛl də vil], City Hall) is a municipal building in Achères, Yvelines, in the northwestern suburbs of Paris, standing on Rue Deschamps Guérin.

== History ==
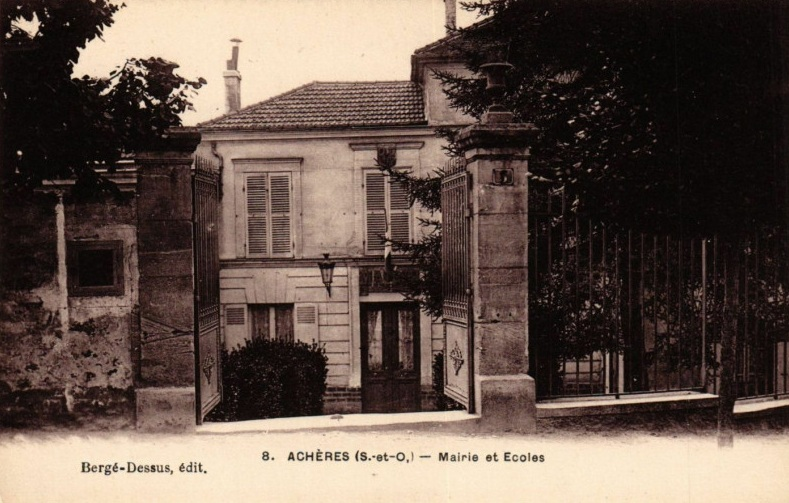
The old town hall

Following the French Revolution, the new town council originally met in the house of the mayor at the time. This arrangement continued until the second half of the 19th century when the town council commissioned a combined town hall and school on the west side of what is now Avenue Lénine. The building was designed in the neoclassical style and built in ashlar stone. The design involved an asymmetrical main frontage of just two bays facing onto the street. There was a slope leading down to a square-headed doorway in the right-hand bay; the left-hand bay contained a casement window with voussoirs and shutters, while the first floor was fenestrated by casement windows with shutters and cornices. After the building was no longer required for municipal use, it was demolished and the site was reveloped to accommodate the École Élémentaire Paul Langevin and the École maternelle Henri Wallon.

In the early 1990s, following significant population growth, the town council led by the mayor, Pierre Soulat, decided to commission a new town hall. The site they selected was on the west side of Rue Deschamps Guérin. The street had been named after the writer, Alfred Deschamps, and the composer, Jules Guérin, who collaborated to produce the play, Les Infortunes d'un conscript (the Misfortunes of a Conscript). The site had previously been occupied by two schools. A major programme of works to convert several of the existing school buildings for municipal use was completed in June 1995. Meanwhile, the former girls' school was converted into a library.

The design involved the creation of a single-storey entrance block on the eastern corner of the site, which connected the former boys' school, facing northeast, and another pre-existing block, which facing southeast. The new entrance block, which was canted, featured a glass doorway with a pediment above. Internally, the principal room was the Salle du Conseil (council chamber).

On the night of 29 June 2023, during the Nahel Merzouk riots, the town hall was attacked with mortar fire and badly damaged. Repair works were subsequently completed at a cost of €300,000.
