= Eliica =

Electric vehicle prototype

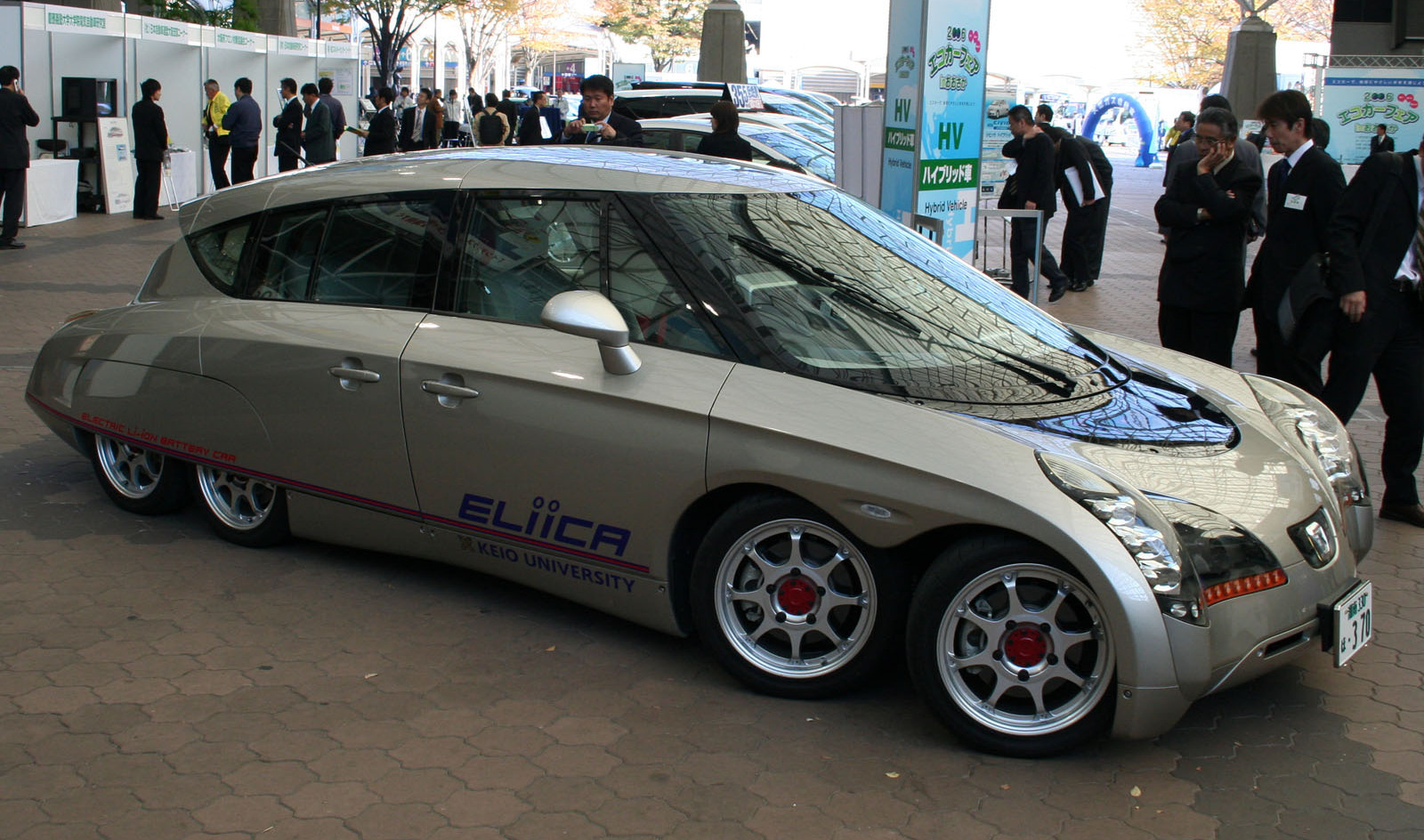
Eliica, the eight-wheeled electric car prototype

The Eliica (or the Electric Lithium-Ion Car) is a battery electric vehicle prototype or concept car first shown in 2004 and designed by a team at Keio University in Tokyo, led by Professor Hiroshi Shimizu. The 5.1 m (17 ft) car runs on a lithium-ion battery and can accelerate from 0–100 km/h (62 mph) in four seconds (faster than the Porsche 911 Turbo at the time). In 2004, the Eliica reached a speed of 370 km/h (230 mph) on Italy's Nardò High Speed Track. The team's goal is to exceed 400 km/h (250 mph), breaking the record set by today's street-legal gasoline-powered vehicles.

Shimizu's new project is called "SIM-Drive" (シムドライブ), with wheel hub motors.

== KAZ ==
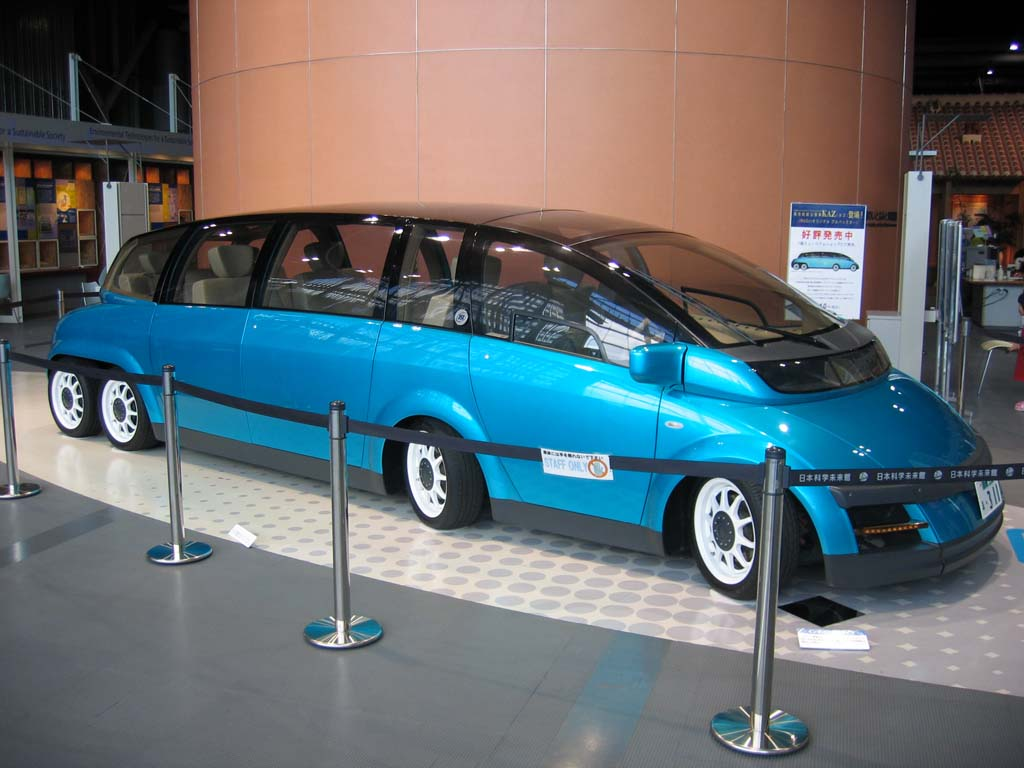
KAZ

The Eliica is a refinement of the earlier KAZ (Keio Advanced Zero-emission vehicle), a 6.7 m (22 ft) limousine-sized 8-wheel 8-person electric vehicle prototype of 2003 that also set speed records.

== Design details ==
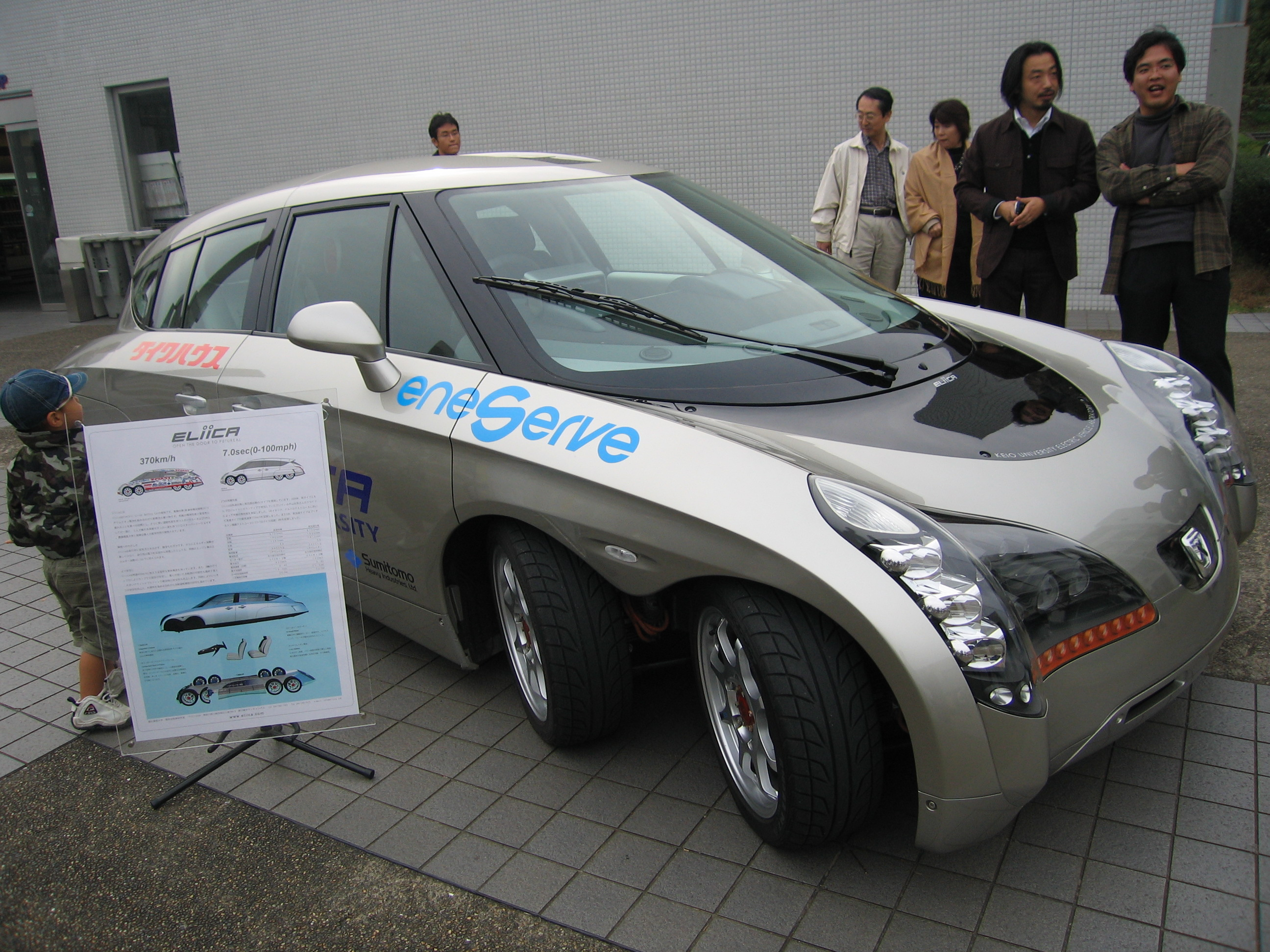
Eliica shown at Intex Osaka.

The Eliica weighs 2,400 kg (5,291 lb) and seats the driver and three passengers. The body was tested in a wind tunnel. The front doors open forward and the rear doors open upward like gull wings. The car's platform contains 4 tracks of 80 batteries, which make up one third of the vehicle's cost. They currently require about 10 hours of recharging at 100 volts from empty to full charge, and can be easily charged off a residential power grid.

The car has eight wheels to improve traction, and they are smaller than normal passenger vehicles, so it can be lower to the ground for better aerodynamics and stability. Each of the wheels has a 60 kW (80 hp) electric motor, giving a 480 kW (644 hp) eight wheel drive which can tackle all kinds of road surfaces. The four front wheels steer. The electric motors mean that the Eliica can deliver a smooth acceleration free from gear shifts of about 0.8 g. Each wheel contains a disc brake and employs a regenerative brake system to recover energy.

There are currently (as of 2005) two versions of the Eliica: a Speed model and an Acceleration model. The Speed model is made to challenge gasoline-based records and has a top speed of 370 km/h (230 mph) with a range of 200 km (120 mi). The Acceleration model is made for the street and has a top speed of 190 km/h (118 mph) with a range of 320 km (200 mi).

The estimated cost of development was in excess of US$320,000. Once the team receives corporate sponsorship, they plan to produce at least 200 units. As of early 2007, the projected price was ¥30,000,000 (about US$255,000).

On December 19, 2005, then-Prime Minister of Japan Junichiro Koizumi tested this vehicle in a 10-minute ride to the Japanese Parliament. In 2006, the car was tested by Shintaro Ishihara, the governor of Tokyo, as well as by Naruhito, Crown Prince of Japan.

== See also ==
- Electric vehicle
- Battery electric vehicle
- List of electric cars currently available
- Eight-wheel drive
- Toyota FCHV
- Honda EV Plus

Land speed record electric vehicles

- La Jamais Contente
- Buckeye Bullet

=== Other 8-wheelers ===
- OctoAuto
- 1925 8-wheel car Liborio E. Rivas of Santa Rita, New Mexico patented it in April 1925
- "Spider-Car" an experimental vehicle, produced by Eight Wheel Motor Vehicle Company, appeared in 1929 in San Francisco; rebuild 1927 Marmon

Limousine

- I.D.E.A KAZ 2001 luxury limousine concept; Each of the KAZ’s 8 wheels is powered by its own electric motor, 6 of which are involved in steering.

DIY

- 8-wheeled 1977 Cadillac Eldorado (chassis number 6L47S7Q306322) built from 1980s-1999, V8 engine, four front wheels are for steering
- 8-wheeled Corvette finished in 2010
- 8 Wheel 1989 Isuzu Pickup - Triple Play built from 2005-08 by Steve Francis of Montgomery, Texas; V8 engine, zero ground clearance there is also a 10 Wheel 1991 Isuzu Pickup from 2005
