= Gaston de Chasseloup-Laubat =

French racing driver (1866–1903)

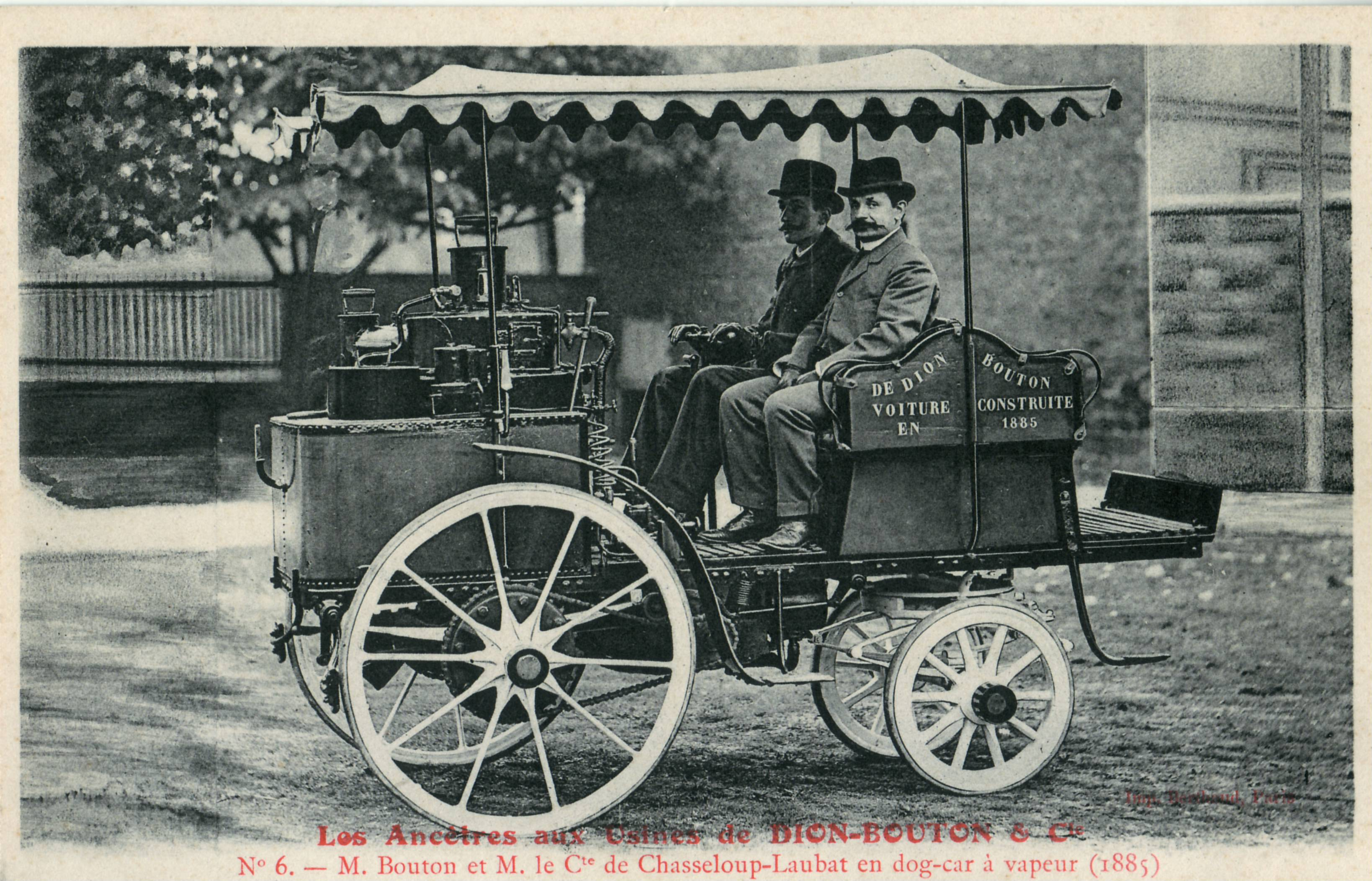
Georges Bouton and the count de Chasseloup-Laubat on a steam automobile Trépardoux & Cie. Dog Cart de route (1885)

Count Charles-François Gaston Louis Prosper de Chasseloup-Laubat (7 June 1866 – 20 November 1903) was a French aristocrat and race car driver.

== Biography ==
Born in Paris, he was the son of Prosper, Marquis of Chasseloup-Laubat, minister of the Navy under Napoleon III, and the American Marie-Louise Pilié.

In 1897 he won the Marseille-La Turbie long-distance race with a steam vehicle built by Trépardoux & Cie, predecessor of De Dion-Bouton. This was the only major city-to-city event won by a steam car.

On 18 December 1898 he set the first recognised automobile land speed record at Achères, Yvelines, driving a Jeantaud electric car. The record was set as part of a competition organised by the French automobile magazine La France Automobile. He completed a single flying 1 kilometre (0.62 mi) run in 57 seconds to give an average speed of 63.13 km/h (39.23 mph).

He further improved this record to 66.65 km/h (41.41 mph) one month later on 17 January 1899, also at Achères, in the first of a series of record setting duels with Camille Jenatzy. Ten days later Jenatzy managed to break this record with a speed of 80.35 km/h (49.93 mph), although it would revert to de Chasseloup-Laubat on 4 March 1899, when he increased it to 92.69 km/h (57.59 mph). Jenatzy finally took the record on 29 April 1899, with the first run to exceed 100 km/h (62.14 mph) with an average speed of 105 km/h (65.24 mph), a record that was to last three years.

The Count died in Le Cannet, near Cannes, aged 37, after a two-year long illness.
