= Jeantaud =

French automobile manufacturer 1893–1907

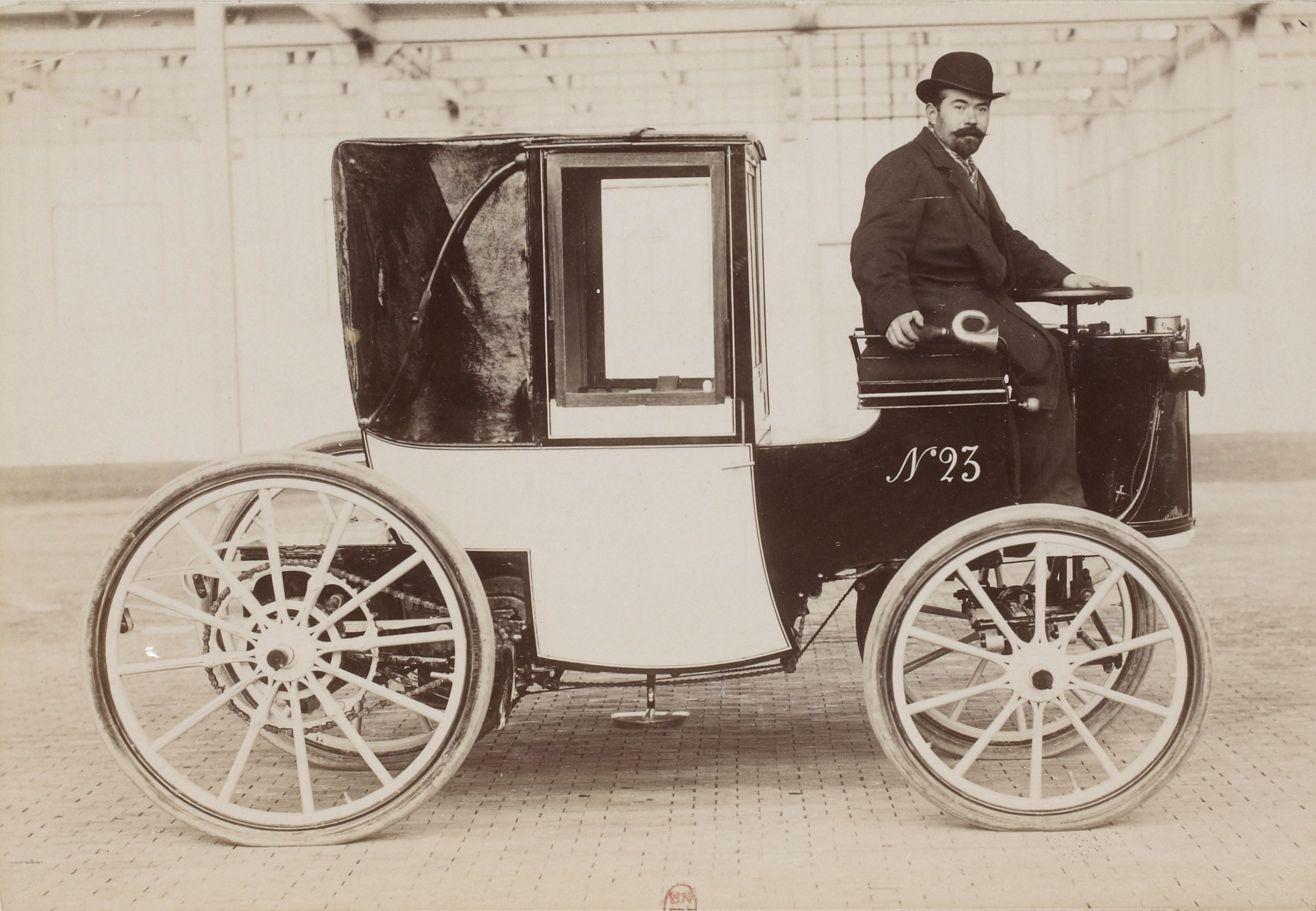
Jeantaud Milord (1898)

The Jeantaud was a make of French automobile manufactured in Paris from 1893 until 1907. It was the brainchild of Charles Jeantaud, a coachbuilder who built his first electric carriage in 1881. Among the vehicles he constructed was the first car to set a land speed record at 63.15 km/h (39.24 mph), driven by Gaston de Chasseloup-Laubat, as well as coupes and hansom cabs; in these the driver sat high, and to the rear. Some cars had an unusual bevel-gear front-wheel-drive layout. From 1902 to 1904, Jeantaud offered a range of 2-, 3- and 4-cylinder gasoline-engined cars similar to 1898 Panhards.

The company ceased trading in 1906 following the suicide of its founder.

== Specifications of record breaker ==
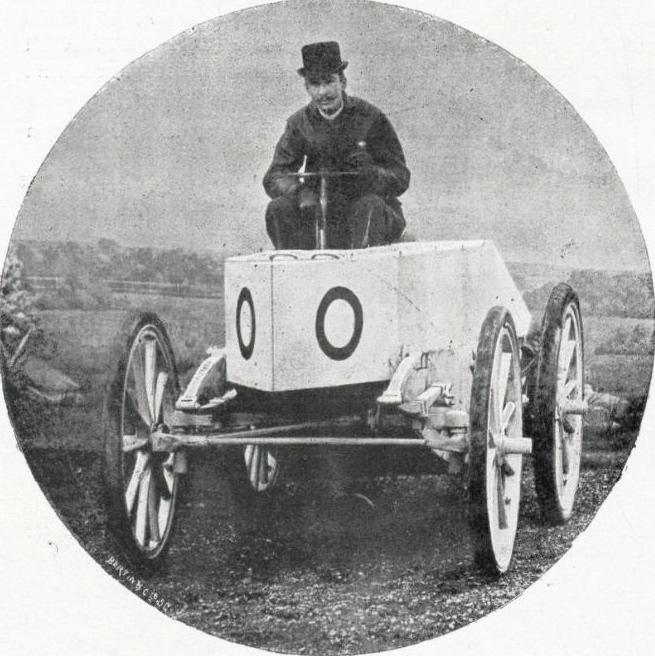
Count Gaston de Chasseloup-Laubat on the Jeantaud Duc Profilée

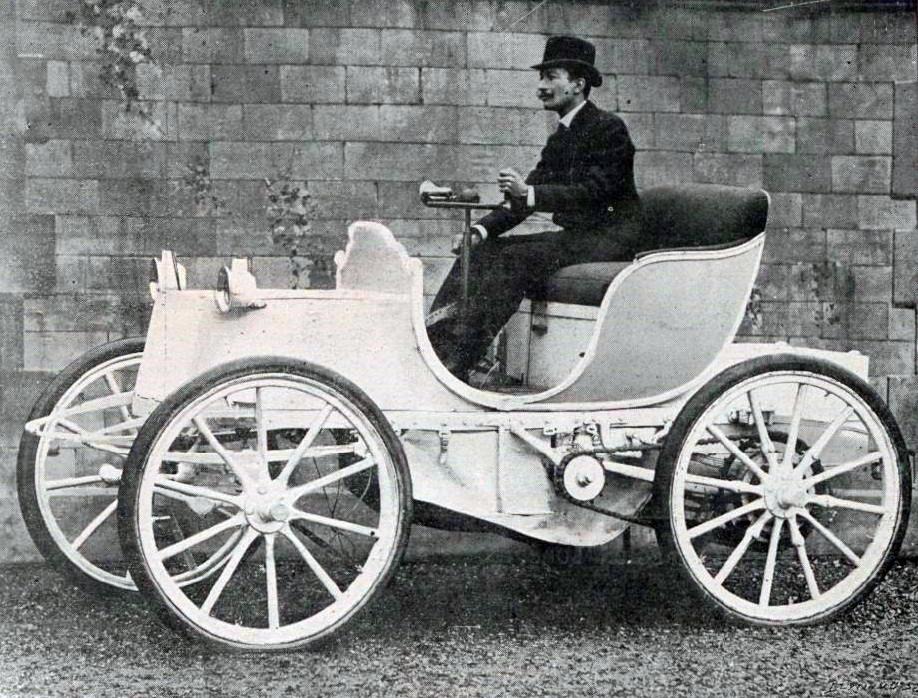
Count Gaston de Chasseloup-Laubat in a Jeantaud Duc (1899)

The 1899 Jeantaud Duc Profilée was powered by a 26.8 kW (35.9 hp) electric engine. The car weighed around 1,400 kg (3,100 lb) and transmitted its power to the rear wheels through a chain-drive gearbox. The Profilée was designed to be more aerodynamic than its older brother, featuring pointed ends on both the front and back, which allowed it to break the record top speed of 79 km/h (49 mph) of its less aerodynamic rival the GCA Dogcart on 4 March 1899, achieving a speed of 92 km/h (57 mph). Its record, though, was quickly broken by the more famous La Jamais Contente, the first purpose-built land speed record car, which reached 105 km/h (65 mph).

== Gallery ==
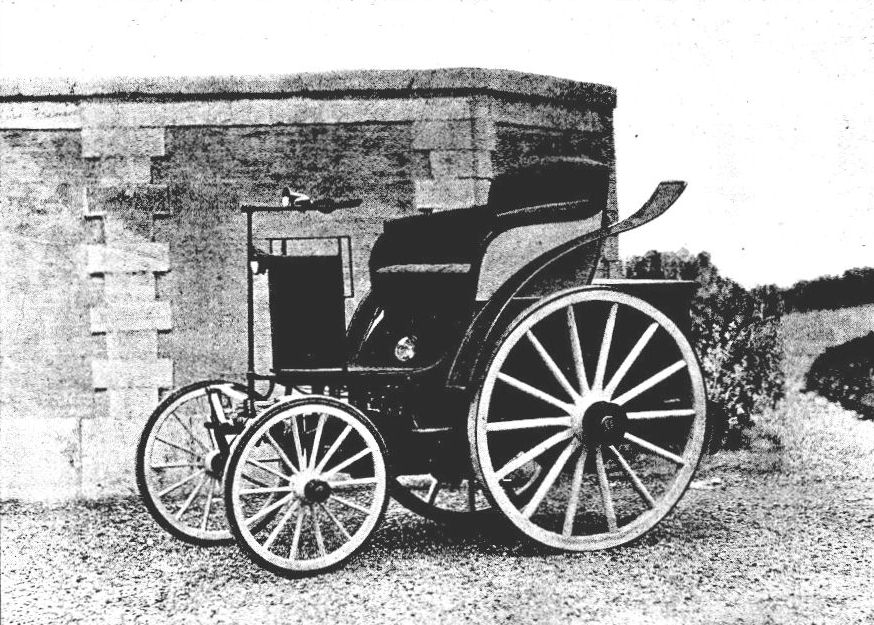
Jeantaud Électrique 12 HP (1895)

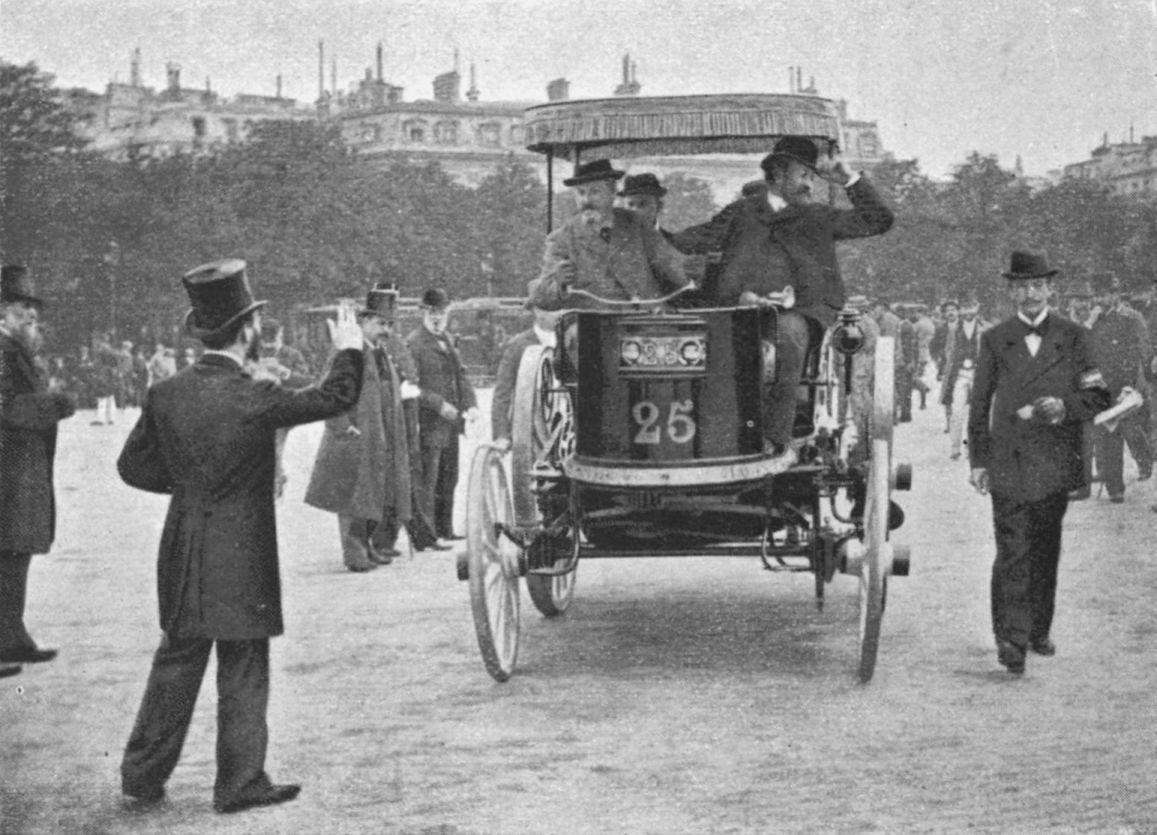
Jeantaud Électrique 7 HP (Paris–Bordeaux 1895)

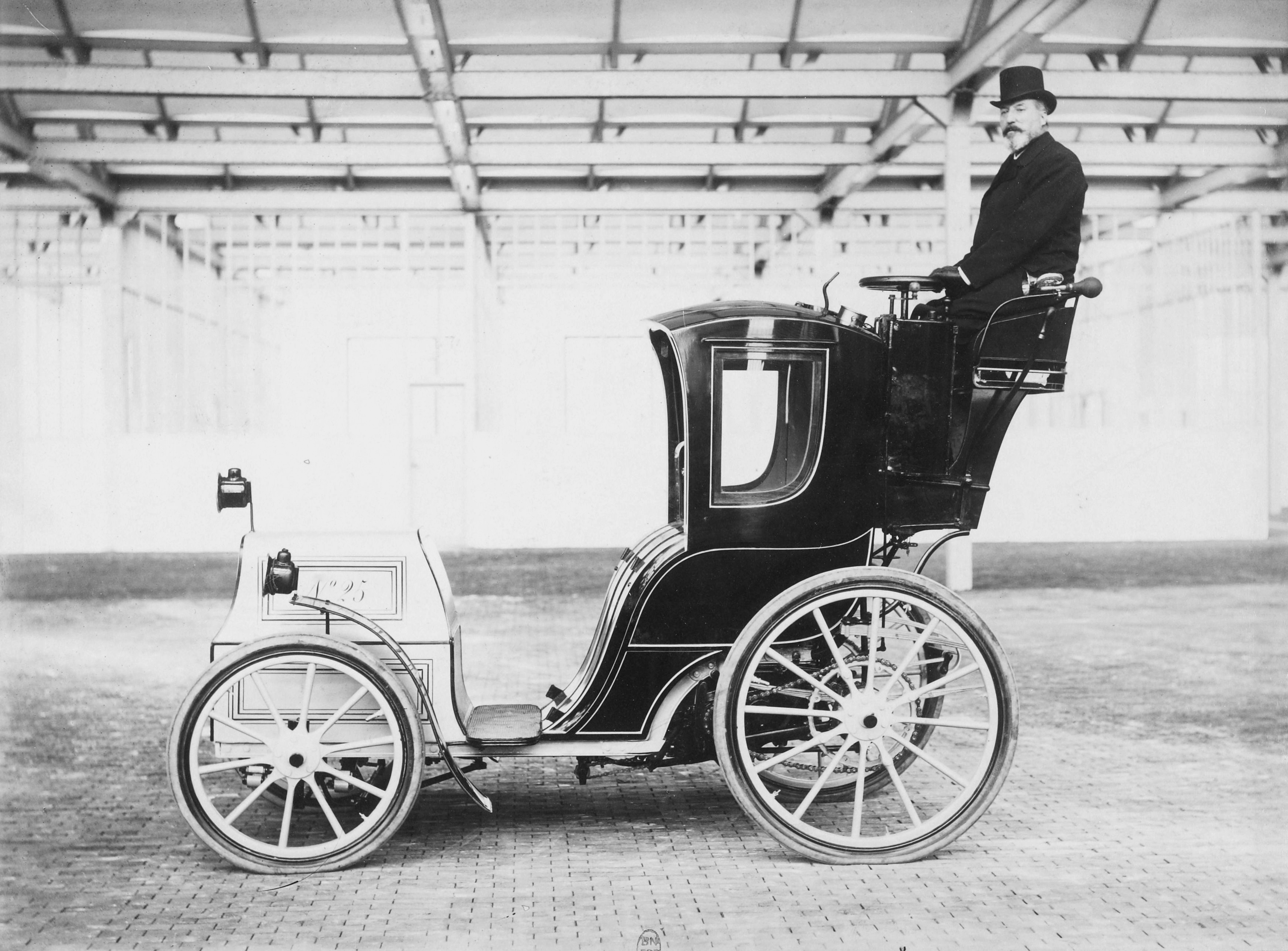
Jeantaud Cab électrique (Concours de fiacres 1898)

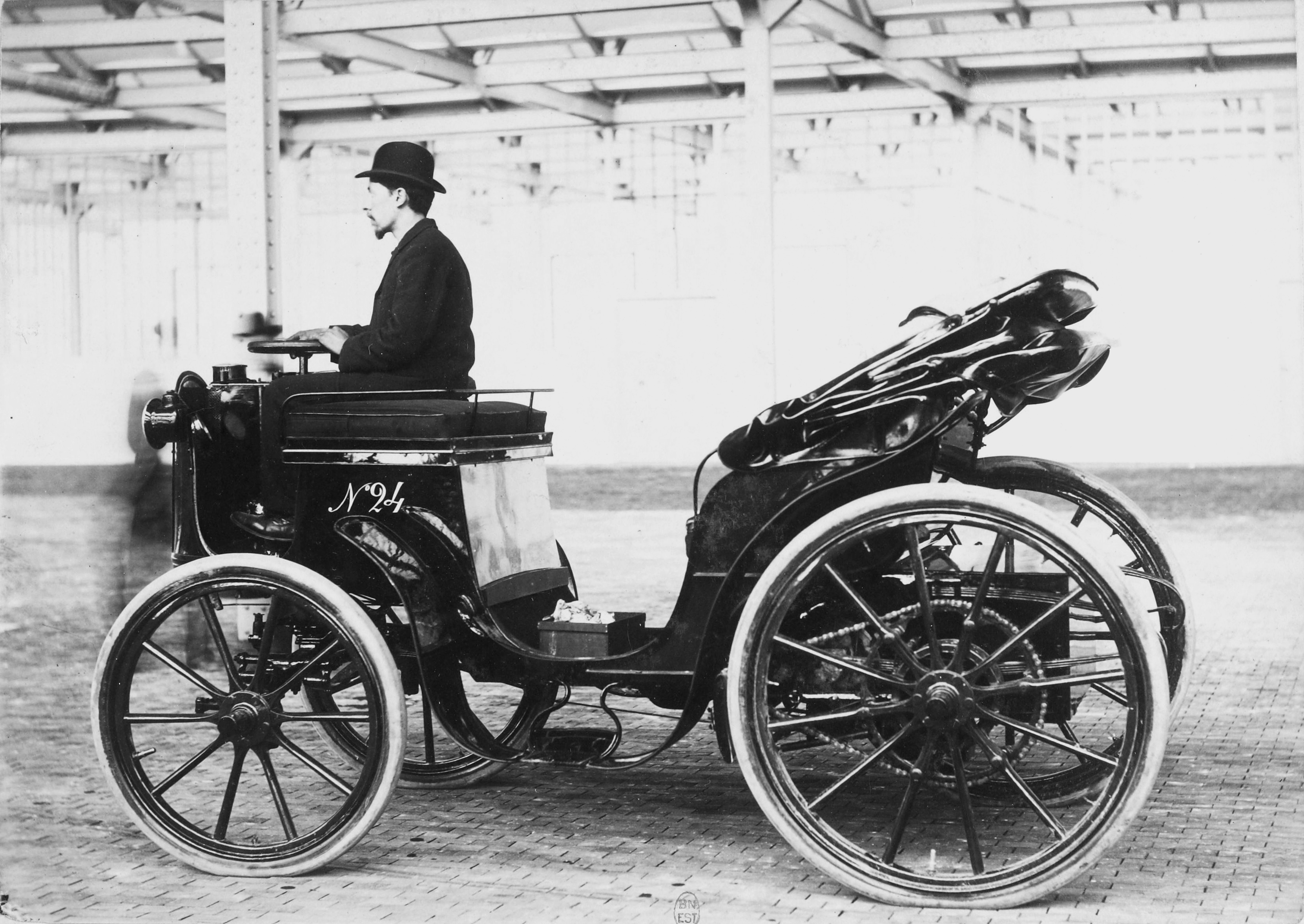
Jeantaud Landaulet électrique (Concours de fiacres 1898)
