= General Motors EV1 =

Subcompact electric car

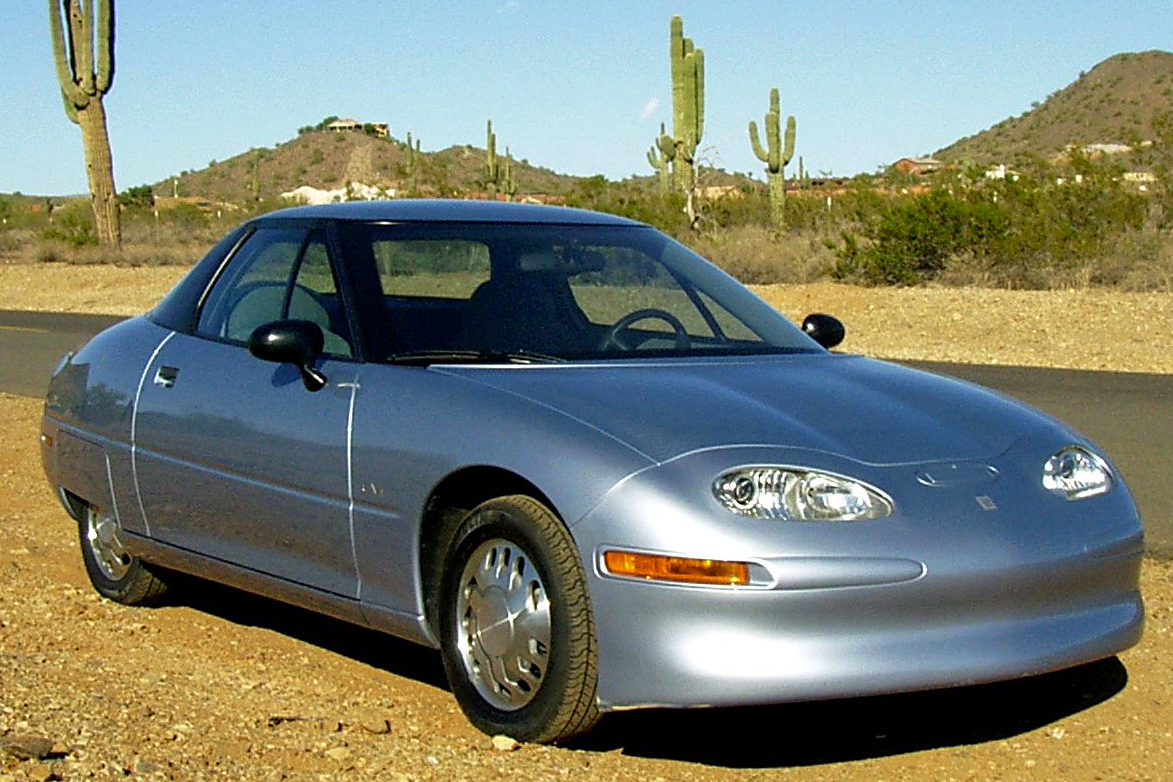

Overview
- Manufacturer: General Motors
- Production: 1996–1999
- Model years: 1997 (Gen I): 660 units; 1999 (Gen II): 457 units
- Assembly: United States: Lansing, Michigan (Lansing Craft Center)

Body and chassis
- Class: Subcompact car
- Body style: 2-door coupé
- Layout: Transverse front-motor, front-wheel drive

Powertrain
- Electric motor: Three-phase alternating current; induction motor with; IGBT power inverter
- Transmission: Single-speed reduction integrated with motor and differential
- Battery: 16.5–18.7 kWh lead–acid; 26.4 kWh nickel–metal hydride (NiMH)
- Electric range: EPA, revised to 2019 procedure: Lead–acid: 55 mi (89 km); NiMH: 105 mi (169 km); EPA, original 1999 procedure: Lead–acid: 78 mi (126 km); NiMH: 142 mi (228 km)
- Plug-in charging: 6.6 kW Magne Charge inductive converter

Dimensions
- Wheelbase: 98.9 in (2,510 mm)
- Length: 169.7 in (4,310 mm)
- Width: 69.5 in (1,770 mm)
- Height: 50.5 in (1,280 mm)
- Curb weight: 3,086 lb (1,400 kg) with lead–acid batteries; 2,908 lb (1,319 kg) with NiMH batteries

The General Motors EV1 is a subcompact car that was produced from 1996 to 1999 by the American automaker General Motors (GM). A two-door, two-seat coupe, it was the first attempt by a major American automaker at a purpose-built, mass-produced electric vehicle following the 1990 introduction of the emissions standards in the US.

In 1990, GM debuted the battery electric Impact prototype, from which the design of the production EV1 was largely inspired. The California Air Resources Board enacted a mandate that year, stating that the seven leading automakers marketing vehicles in the US must produce and sell zero-emissions vehicles to maintain access to the California market. GM began manufacturing the car in 1996. In its initial stages of production, most of them were leased to consumers in California, Arizona, and Georgia. Within a year of the EV1's release, leasing programs were also launched in various other American states.

Produced in two short generations, the EV1 featured a lightweight aluminum frame and a three-phase AC induction motor capable of producing 137 brake horsepower (102 kW). At the 1998 Detroit Auto Show, GM unveiled several EV1 prototypes, comprising a series hybrid, a parallel hybrid, a compressed natural gas variant, and a four-door conversion. Despite favorable customer reception, GM believed that electric cars occupied an unprofitable niche of the automobile market, ultimately reclaiming and crushing most of the cars. In 2003, GM terminated the EV1 program, disregarding protests from customers.

The EV1's cancellation has remained a subject of dispute. Electric car enthusiasts, environmental interest groups, and former EV1 lessees have accused the company of self-sabotaging its electric car program to avoid potential losses in spare parts sales and also blamed the oil industry for conspiring to keep electric cars off the road. The discontinuation inspired the documentary film Who Killed the Electric Car? (2006) and gained GM a reputation as the company "that killed the electric car".

== History ==
During the 1970s and 1980s, progress in electric vehicle development had largely stalled, with over 80 percent of vehicles produced in the US powered by V8 engines. The enactment of the 1990 Clean Air Act Amendment and the 1992 Energy Policy Act, alongside the introduction of new transportation emissions regulations by the California Air Resources Board (CARB), led to a renewed interest in electric vehicles in the US.

=== Development ===
At the 1990 Los Angeles Auto Show, GM chairman Roger Smith demonstrated the Impact, a battery electric concept car. The company initially planned to produce 20,000 units but later raised the goal to 100,000 vehicles per year. Developed by the electric vehicle company AeroVironment, the Impact featured design knowledge gained from GM's success in the 1987 World Solar Challenge—a trans-Australian race for solar-powered cars, which the automaker's Sunraycer won. Alan Cocconi from AC Propulsion designed and built the original drive system electronics for the Impact, which was further developed by Hughes Electronics. The Impact was powered by 32 lead–acid rechargeable batteries and had a top speed of 183 mph (295 km/h). On April 18, 1990, Smith announced that the Impact would become a production vehicle, with a goal of 25,000 annual units.

1990 GM Impact concept car

The CARB launched a major environmental initiative in 1990. The board required the seven largest automakers in the US—with GM as the largest—to ensure that two percent of their fleets were emission-free by 1998, rising to five percent by 2001 and ten percent by 2003, depending on consumer demand. CARB said that the mandate was intended to combat California's severe air pollution, which at the time exceeded the combined pollution levels of the other forty-nine states. In response, other members of the former American Automobile Manufacturers Association, including Toyota, Nissan, and Honda, also developed prototype zero-emissions vehicles.

In 1994, GM launched PrEView, a program in which fifty hand-built Impact electric cars were loaned to drivers for one- to two-week periods, with the requirement that participants document their experiences and provide feedback. Driver feedback on the Impact was positive, as were assessments from the automotive press. Motor Trend said that the Impact "is precisely one of those occasions where GM proves beyond any doubt that it knows how to build fantastic automobiles" and called it "the world's only electric vehicle that drives like a real car". Automobile magazine commended its ride and handling as "amazing" and praised its "smooth delivery of power". That same year, a modified Impact set a production electric vehicle land speed record of 183 mph (295 km/h). Despite the good reception, as highlighted in a front-page feature in The New York Times, GM appeared to be unenthusiastic about the prospect of having created a successful electric car:

General Motors is preparing to put its electric vehicle act on the road, and planning for a flop. With pride and pessimism, the company, the furthest along of the Big Three in designing a mass-market electric car, says [...] it has done its best but that the vehicle has come up short. [...] Now it hopes that lawmakers and regulators will agree with it and postpone or scrap the deadline.

According to the report, GM considered the PrEView program a failure, concluding that electric cars were not yet commercially viable and that CARB regulations should be rescinded. Dennis Minano, GM's vice president for Energy and Environment, questioned whether consumers actually wanted electric vehicles. Robert James Eaton, chairman of Chrysler, expressed doubt about the readiness of mass-produced electric cars, stating in 1994: "If the law is there, we'll meet it [...] at this point of time, nobody can forecast that we can make an electric car". Their skepticism drew criticism from Thomas C. Jorling, Commissioner of Environmental Conservation for New York State, which had adopted California's emissions program. Jorling argued that consumers had shown substantial interest in electric vehicles and suggested that automakers were reluctant to move away from internal combustion technology because of their massive existing investments.

=== History of production ===
Following the PrEView program, work on the GM electric car program persisted. The original fifty Impact cars were destroyed after testing was completed, and the design had evolved into the EV1 by 1996. The first generation of the EV1 was powered by lead–acid batteries; 660 units were produced, all of which were provided under a leasing agreement that explicitly prohibited purchase. GM's Saturn subsidiary was responsible for leasing and maintenance of the EV1. Analysts projected a potential market ranging from 5,000 to 20,000 cars annually. An industry insider estimated that each EV1 cost GM roughly $80,000 to produce when factoring in research, development, and related expenses, while other reports placed the figure closer to $100,000. GM invested just under $500 million in the EV1 and associated electric vehicle technologies, and more than $1 billion overall.

GM pre-screened lessees, limiting initial eligibility to residents of Southern California and Arizona, with the program beginning on December 5, 1996. Leasing rates for the EV1s ranged from $399 to $549 a month. The car's launch was accompanied by an extensive $8 million promotional campaign that included prime-time television commercials, billboards, a dedicated website, and a tie-in appearance at the premiere of the Sylvester Stallone film Daylight (1996). Early lessees included several high-profile figures, among them celebrities, executives, and politicians. At the debut event, forty leases were signed, with GM projecting 100 by the end of the year. In its first year, GM leased 288 vehicles. In 1999, Ken Stewart, the brand manager for the EV1 program, characterized the feedback from the car's drivers as "wonderfully-maniacal loyalty".

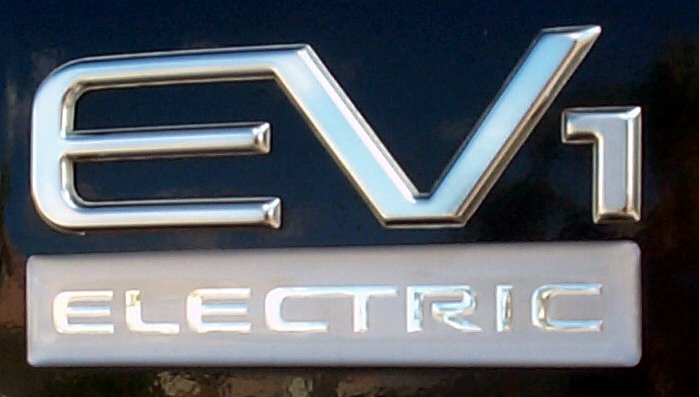
Badging of an EV1

Joe Kennedy, Saturn's vice president of marketing at GM, acknowledged public concerns about the EV1's high cost, reliance on lead–acid battery technology, and limited driving range, remarking, "Let us not forget that technology starts small and grows slowly before technology improves and costs go down." Some anti-tax groups criticized the incentives provided to EV1 lessees, claiming they amounted to government-subsidized driving for the wealthy. Marvin Rush, a cinematographer for the television series Star Trek: Voyager (1995–2001), observed that GM was failing to properly market the EV1. He spent $20,000 of his own money to produce and air four unofficial radio advertisements promoting the vehicle. Although GM initially disapproved of the advertisements, the company later reimbursed Rush and officially endorsed the commercials. By 1997, GM had committed $10 million to EV1 advertising, with plans to increase the budget by another $5 million the following year.

In 1998, GM introduced the second-generation EV1. The update yielded reduced production costs, quieter operation, and significant reductions in weight. The second-generation models were initially released with a Panasonic lead–acid battery pack; soon after, an Ovonics nickel–metal hydride battery (NiMH) was added as an option. The second generation EV1 leasing program expanded to several other American cities, with monthly payments ranging from $349 to $574. GM produced and leased 457 second-generation EV1s. On March 2, 2000, GM issued a recall for 450 first-generation EV1s. The automaker had determined that a faulty charge port cable could eventually build up enough heat to catch on fire. Sixteen "thermal incidents" were reported, including at least one fire that resulted in the destruction of a charging vehicle. The recall did not affect second generation EV1s.

== Design ==
=== Construction and technology ===
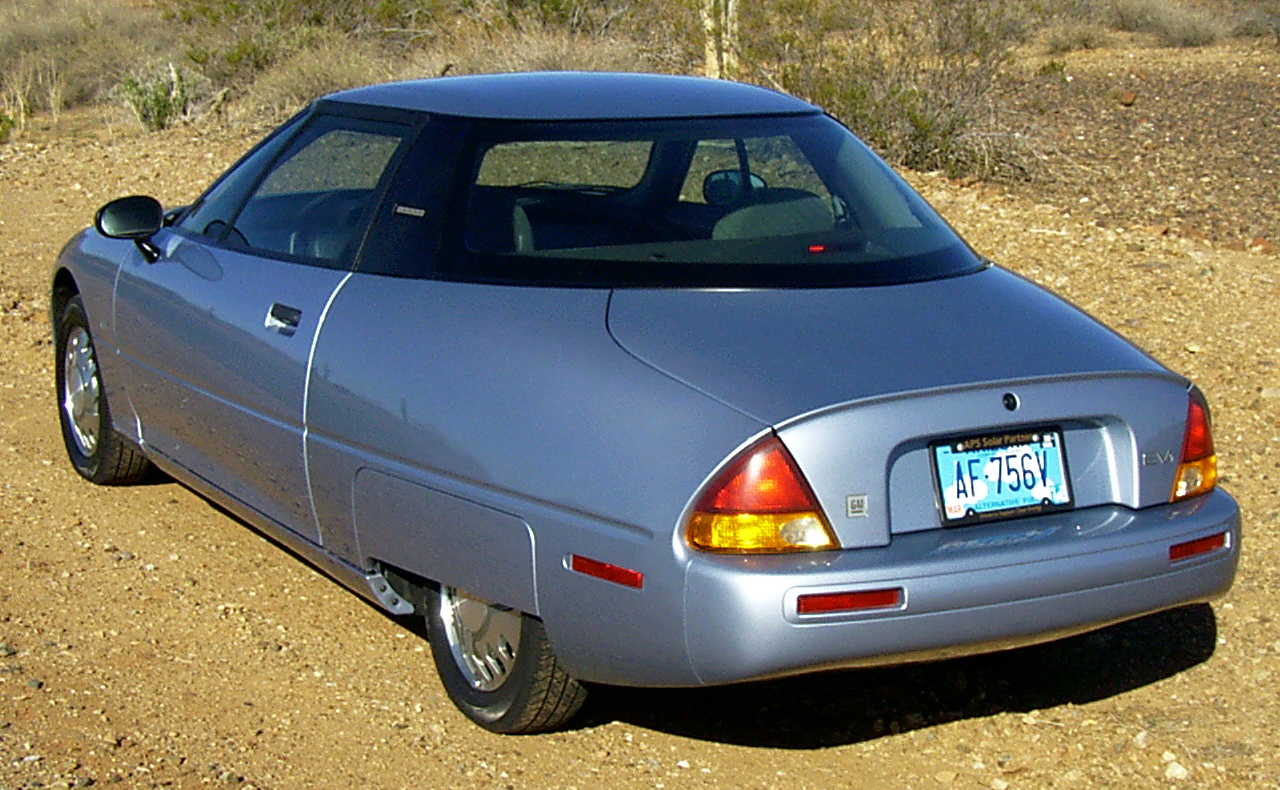
Rear view

As opposed to many electric vehicles of its time, the EV1 was a mass-produced and purpose-built battery electric vehicle rather than a conversion of another car. Kenneth Baker, a General Motors (GM) engineer, was the lead engineer for the EV1 program, having previously served as such for the unsuccessful Chevrolet Electrovette program in the 1970s.

To maximize the car's efficiency, extensive wind-tunnel testing was conducted on the EV1, and GM additionally implemented partial fender skirts on the rear wheelhouses. The rear wheels are nine inches (230 mm) closer together than the front wheels, thereby creating a "teardrop" shape. These resulted in a very low drag coefficient of Cd=0.19 and a drag area of CdA=3.95 ft^{2} (0.367 m^{2}). The EV1 was supported by super-lightweight magnesium alloy wheels and low-rolling resistance tires developed by Michelin. The tires were mounted on light fourteen-inch wheels and inflated to 50 pounds per square inch (psi). The rubber compound and hardness of these tires helped to minimize rolling resistance.

Almost all of the EV1's components were engineered to maximize energy efficiency. Its spaceframe, constructed of rolled, stamped, and cast aluminum, was the lightest of its kind, weighing just 290 pounds (130 kg)—40 percent less than a typical steel frame. The frame was covered with three types of plastic, with reinforced fiberglass used for the roof, doors, and hood. For components requiring greater flexibility, such as the bumpers and interior fascias, reaction injection-molded polyurethane was used. The EV1 employed a regenerative braking system that converted the drive motor into a generator when the brakes were applied. This process slowed the vehicle while recovering kinetic energy and feeding it back into the battery. At 169.7 inches (4,310 mm) long, the EV1 is a two-door, two-seat subcompact car with a coupe body style. The power-assisted anti-lock braking system was electrically operated. The front disc brakes used an electro-hydraulic mechanism, while the rear drum brakes were fully electric, an industry first.

Conventional vehicles use waste heat from the engine to warm the cabin, but because electric vehicles produce very little excess heat, GM had to develop an alternative system. The company equipped the EV1 with a heat pump to manage cabin temperature, using only about one-third of the energy required by a conventional heating and cooling system. However, the heat pump was effective only when ambient temperatures were above 30 °F (−1 °C).

=== Drivetrain and battery ===
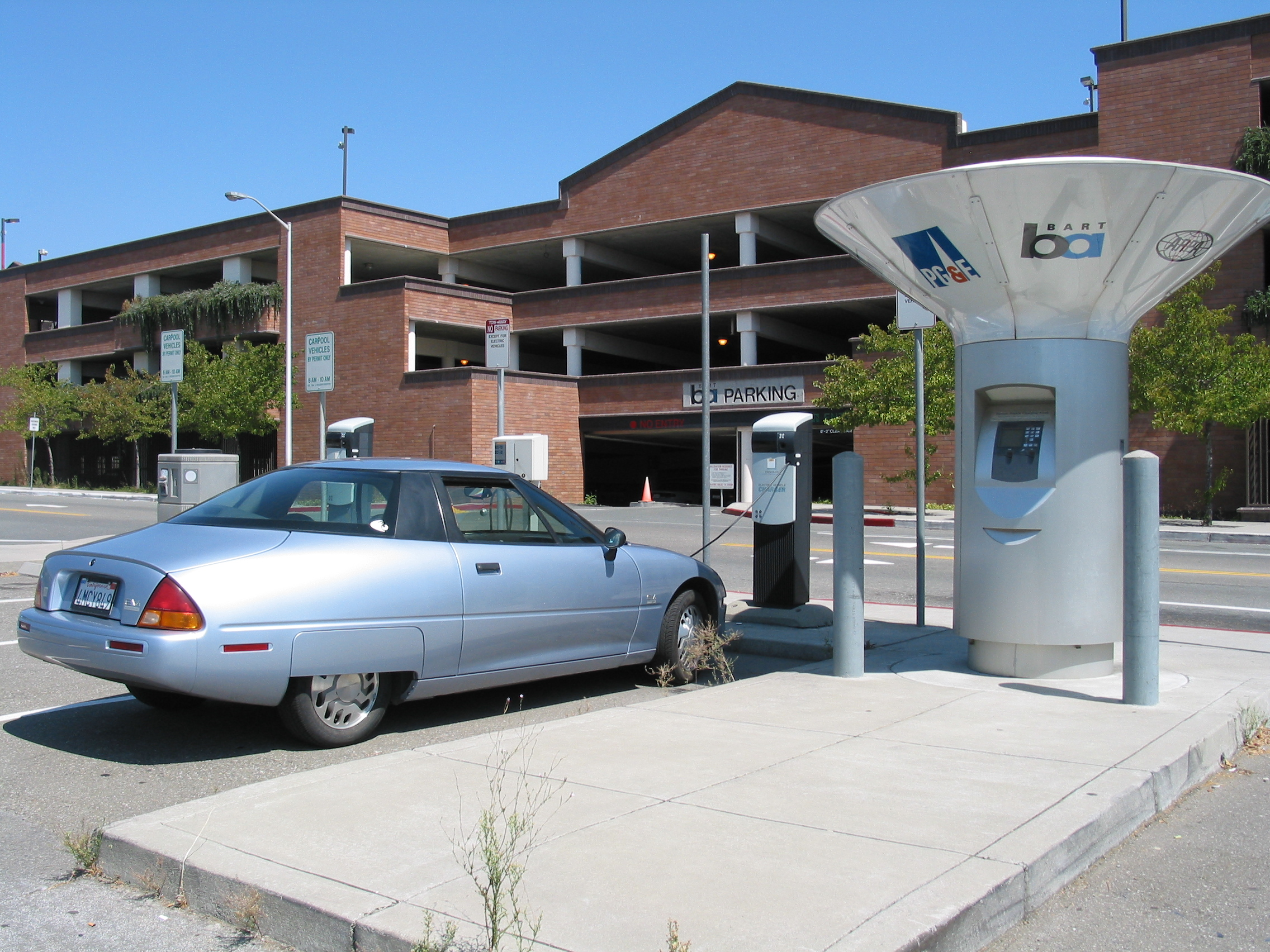
An EV1 charging at the Walnut Creek BART Station in California in August 2002

The electric motor in the EV1 operated on a three-phase AC induction system, generating 137 brake horsepower (102 kW) at 7,000 revolutions per minute (rpm). The EV1 could maintain its full torque capacity across its entire power range, delivering 110 pound-feet (150 N⋅m) of torque from 0 to 7,000 rpm. Power was transmitted to the front wheels through an integrated single-speed reduction transmission.

The first-generation EV1 used lead–acid batteries that weighed 1,175 pounds (533 kg). Supplied by GM's Delco Remy division, these packs were rated at 53 amp-hours at 312 volts (16.5 kWh), giving the car a range of 60 to 100 miles (97 to 161 km). When the second generation of the EV1 was introduced in 1999, the car adopted a new set of lead–acid batteries from the Japanese electronics company Panasonic, increasing the battery weight to 1,310 pounds (590 kg). The batteries were rated at 60 amp-hours at 312 volts (18.7 kWh), and the car had a range of 80 to 100 miles (130 to 160 km). Soon after, production began on the Ovonics-manufactured NiMH battery pack. This pack was much lighter than the lead–acid battery, weighing 1,060 pounds (480 kg). The NiMH batteries were rated at 77 amp-hours at 343 volts (26.4 kWh) and allowed the car to travel from 75 to 150 miles (121 to 241 km) between charges.

To charge the EV1, GM equipped the car with the Magne Charge inductive charging paddle, developed and manufactured by Delco Electronics, a GM subsidiary. This paddle was inserted into a slot located between the EV1's headlights. The wireless inductive charging system required no direct electrical contact, though there were isolated reports of fires originating at the charge port. Rapid recharging depended on the dedicated home charger supplied by GM. GM also provided a 120-volt AC convenience charger for the lead–acid models, which was stored in the trunk. With a Magne Charge unit, charging a lead-acid EV1 took from three to fifteen hours; NiMH models typically needed six to eight hours to reach a full charge.

== 1998 conversions ==
GM unveiled a series of alternative-fuel prototype models at the 1998 Detroit Auto Show. Among them, the compressed natural gas version was the only non-electric model, created by modifying the standard two-seat EV1 platform. It used a 1.0-liter turbocharged engine and was advertised at 60 miles per US gallon (3.9 L/100 km; 72 mpg_{‑imp}). The series hybrid prototype incorporated an auxiliary power unit (APU) with a gas turbine engine mounted in the trunk. Built by Williams International, the system combined a lightweight gas turbine with a high-speed permanent-magnet AC generator, primarily used to charge the batteries. The parallel hybrid prototype paired a 1.3-liter Isuzu turbocharged, direct-injection diesel engine to drive the rear wheels with an Ovonics electric motor powering the front wheels. GM also presented a fuel cell model, whose system converted hydrogen to electricity. The company also debuted a four-passenger EV1 concept, which extended the original vehicle by 19 inches (480 mm) and replaced the rear beam axle with an independent rear suspension.

== Demise ==
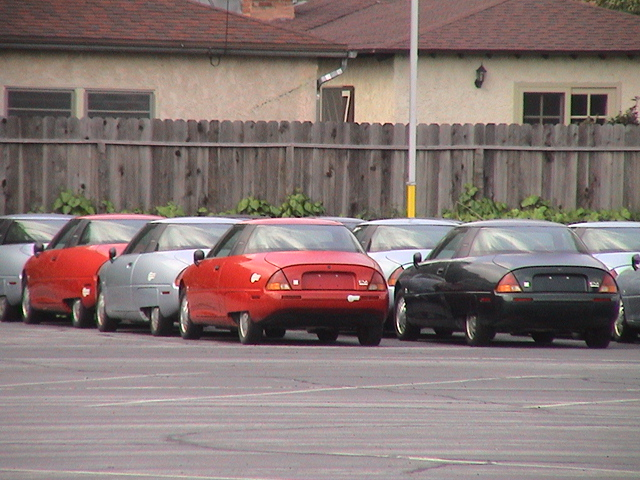
EV1s awaiting their crushing at GM's training center in Burbank, California, in 2005

Despite favorable customer reception, GM believed that electric cars occupied an unprofitable niche of the automobile market. The company ended production of the EV1 in 1999, after 1,117 examples had been produced over three years. In February 2002, GM notified lessees that they would be recalling the cars, contradicting an earlier statement in which Stewart said that the company had no intention of taking vehicles back from customers. The EV1 program was completely terminated in late 2003 under GM CEO Rick Wagoner.

Fifty-eight EV1 drivers submitted letters and deposit checks to GM, proposing lease extensions that would impose no financial burden on the company. They offered to assume responsibility for all maintenance and repairs and allowed GM the right to end the lease if major expenses arose. In June 2002, GM rejected the proposal and returned the checks, which totaled more than $22,000. In 2003, actor Peter Horton reported in the Los Angeles Times that he had attempted to lease an EV1 but was told he could "join their waiting list [of a few thousand]" with an unspecified number of others, and that his chances of receiving a vehicle were minimal. In March 2005, GM spokesman Dave Barthmuss told The Washington Post that "there [was] an extremely passionate, enthusiastic and loyal following for this particular vehicle [...] There simply [were not] enough of them at any given time to make a viable business proposition for GM to pursue long term".

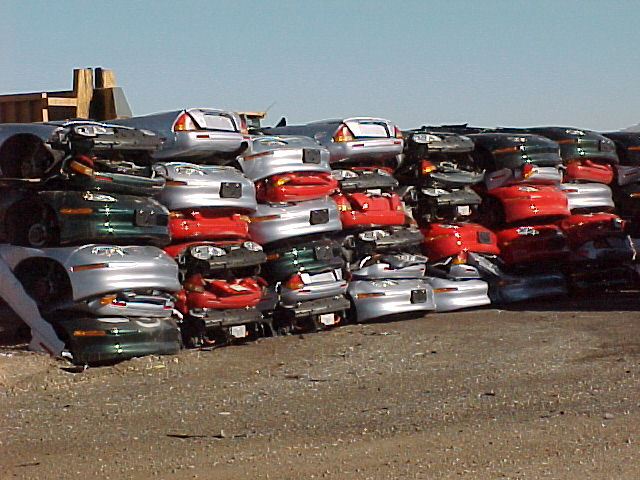
Scrapped EV1s

In November 2003, GM began recalling the vehicles. By the end of August 2004, all leased EV1s had been retrieved; around forty were donated to museums and educational institutions, but with their powertrains disabled to prevent operation. In 2008, engineering students at Howard University in Washington, DC converted the school's EV1 to a hybrid as part of the EcoCAR competition. GM retains several working examples in its Heritage Collection, and Holden—GM's Australian subsidiary—preserved one used for evaluation. That vehicle was rediscovered in 2021 and donated to the National Motor Museum in Birdwood. GM also provided a fully operational EV1 to the Smithsonian Institution after it declined a deactivated unit, though the car is no longer functional due to battery degradation. Most of the remaining vehicles were sent to crushing facilities for disposal.

Filmmaker Francis Ford Coppola claimed on a 2016 episode of Jay Leno's Garage that he had hidden his EV1 from GM, though a company representative disputed this, stating that his leased car had been returned. The vehicle in Coppola's possession was the only EV1 known to be privately held at the time.

=== Reaction and image ===
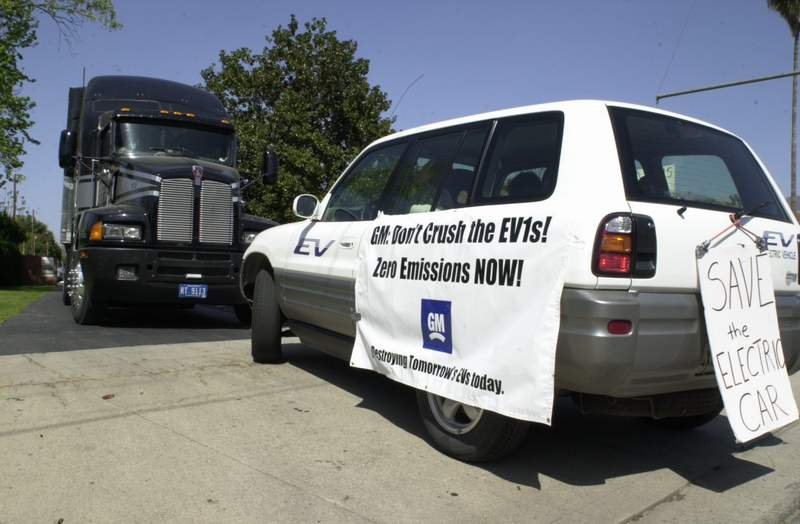
Posters on a Toyota RAV4 EV protesting against the crushing of the EV1

Since its demise and destruction, GM's decision to cancel the EV1 has been a subject of debate and controversy. Smithsonian characterized the EV1 as "not technically a failure", while the Australian Financial Review argued that although the car was "successful", it was ultimately destined to fail. The opinions were often linked to the economic infeasibility of the EV1, and some sources, such as Automotive News, have acknowledged that GM's decision to end the program helped the company avoid long-term financial losses. However, many critics have opposed GM's move to phase out the EV1. Electric vehicle advocates, environmental organizations, and former lessees of the EV1 have accused GM of deliberately undermining its electric vehicle efforts to prevent losses in spare parts sales, and some have also alleged that the oil industry conspired to suppress the adoption of electric cars.

After the EV1's discontinuation, GM garnered a reputation as the company "that killed the electric car". In 2006, Wagoner acknowledged that his decision to discontinue the EV1 electric vehicle program and to deprioritize hybrid development was his biggest regret during his time at GM. He said that while it did not directly affect the company's profitability, it did largely tarnish GM's public image. Wagoner reiterated this in a National Public Radio interview following the December 2008 Senate hearings on the US auto industry bailout. In the March 13, 2007, issue of Newsweek, GM research and development chief Larry Burns expressed regret over the company's decision to discontinue the plug-in hybrid EV1 prototype that engineers had developed a decade earlier: "If we could turn back the hands of time, we could have had the [Chevrolet] Volt ten years earlier", referencing the Volt as an indirect successor to the EV1.

== Legacy and post-demise ==
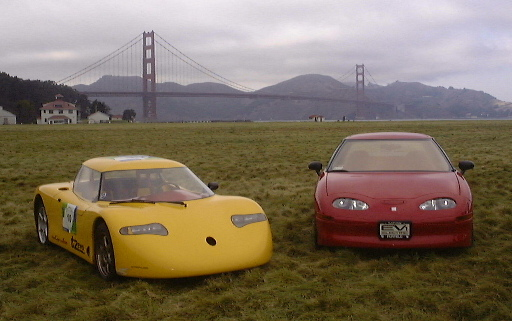
EV1 (right) next to an AC Propulsion tZero (left). Three of the latter were built, but only two are still extant as of 2022. Alan Cocconi designed both cars.

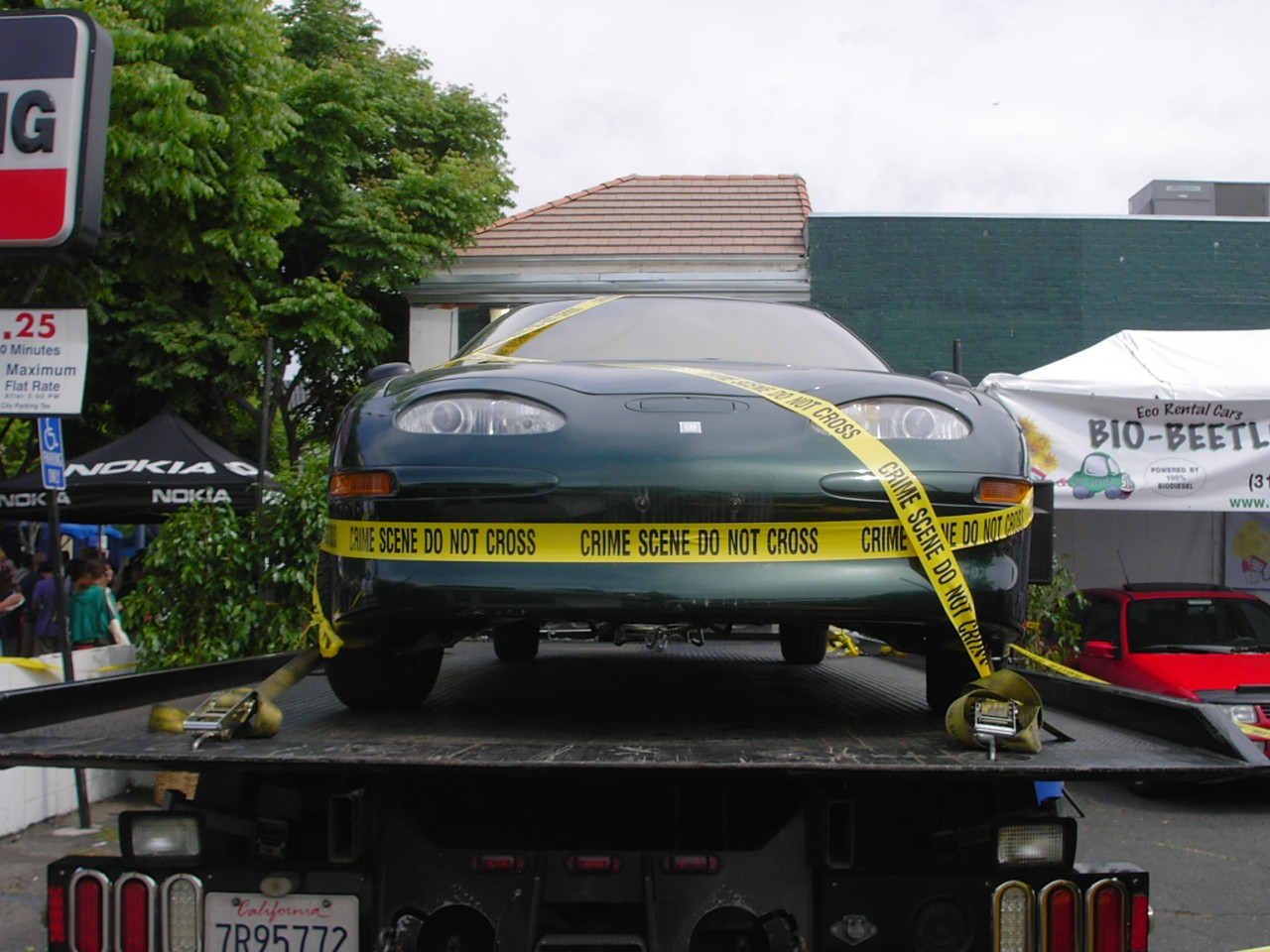
An EV1 at a promotional event for Who Killed The Electric Car? (2006)

The demise of the EV1 helped inspire the creation of the American battery-electric carmaker Tesla Motors. Disturbed by GM's decision to discontinue and destroy the vehicle, Martin Eberhard and Marc Tarpenning founded Tesla Motors in July 2003. About six months later, Elon Musk became a major investor and assumed the role of chairman. In a 2017 Twitter post, Musk wrote: "Since big car companies were killing their EV programs, the only chance was to create an EV company, even though it was almost certain to fail". (Note: This was when Twitter limited tweets to 140 characters. The quote was changed to spell out unnecessary abbreviations and ensure grammatical accuracy.)

Research indicated that automakers were at least a decade behind in electric-vehicle adoption, technology, and infrastructure. While the EV1 is often viewed as ahead of its time, Top Gear remarked that it could also be seen as a product of its era and the technologies available at that time. Lead–acid and NiMH batteries had existed for decades, aerodynamics were well understood, and electric motors were already widely used. As part of GM's broader electrification strategy, and following the late-2010 US launch of the Volt plug-in hybrid, the company introduced the Chevrolet Spark EV in June 2013. It was the company's first all-electric passenger car sold in the US since the discontinuation of the EV1 in 1999. The Spark EV was phased out in December 2016, coinciding with the introduction of the Chevrolet Bolt.

The EV1's demise is examined in Chris Paine's documentary Who Killed the Electric Car? (2006). The film traces the history and development of the electric car, its path to commercialization, and broader issues such as air pollution, oil dependency, and climate change. It explores multiple factors behind the EV1’s cancellation, including the CARB's reversal of its mandate following pressure and lawsuits from automakers, the influence of the oil industry, anticipation surrounding future hydrogen-powered vehicles, and the policies of the George W. Bush administration. The documentary also details GM's efforts to argue that consumer demand for the EV1 was insufficient, followed by the company's decision to reclaim and dispose of nearly all EV1s produced.

In 2017, Time included the EV1 on its list of the "50 Worst Cars of All Time". While praising the vehicle's design and engineering, calling it "a marvel of engineering" and "absolutely the best electric vehicle anyone had ever seen", the magazine criticized its high production costs and the limitations of 1990s battery technology, which prevented electric cars from competing with conventional gasoline vehicles and contributed to the program's end. Writer Dan Neil lamented that the EV1 is remembered largely as a public-relations setback rather than a technological breakthrough, stating: "GM, the company that had done more to advance EV technology than any other, became the company that 'killed the electric car'."

=== Restoration ===
In 2025, an EV1 was sold at a tow yard auction in Atlanta, Georgia, the only documented sale of an EV1. The original lessee of the EV1 later came forward, stating that he had filed a lawsuit against GM when they attempted to repossess the vehicle, which he believes contributed to the car not being destroyed. The vehicle was discovered at Clark Atlanta University after campus police reported it as an abandoned vehicle and impounded it. Up for auction, EV enthusiast Billy Caruso won with a bid of $104,000 and started restoring the vandalized car with the help of YouTube creator Jared Pink of The Questionable Garage. Caruso launched V212, a project to preserve the history of the EV1 and share the restoration with the world. They have been getting help from GM president Mark Reuss, whose father, former GM president Lloyd Reuss from 1990-1992, had championed GM's EV research. In 2026, V212 was restored to running order.

== See also ==
- History of the electric vehicle
- List of production battery electric vehicles

== Print sources ==
- Aifantis, Katerina E.; Kumar, R. V.; Hu, Pu (2022). Rechargeable Ion Batteries. John Wiley & Sons. ISBN 978-3-527-35018-6.
- Anderson, Curtis D.; Anderson, Judy (2010). Electric and Hybrid Cars. McFarland & Company. ISBN 978-0-7864-5742-7.
- "Autocar". Autocar. Vol. 215. Haymarket Motoring Publishing. 1998. ISSN 1355-8293.
- "Automotive Engineering". Automotive Engineering. Vol. 104. Society of Automotive Engineers. 1996.
- "Automotive Engineering". Automotive Engineering. Vol. 105, no. 7–12. Society of Automotive Engineers. 1997.
- Barabba, Vincent P. (2004). Surviving Transformation. Oxford University Press. ISBN 978-0-19-534681-7.
- Blazev, Anco S. (2021). Power Generation and the Environment. CRC Press. ISBN 978-87-7022-310-2.
- Berger, John J. (1998). Charging Ahead. University of California Press. ISBN 978-0-520-21614-3.
- Brooke, Lindsay (2011). Chevrolet Volt: Development Story of the Pioneering Electrified Vehicle. SAE International. ISBN 978-0-7680-5783-6.
- Burton, Nigel (2013). History of Electric Cars. Crowood Press. ISBN 978-1-8479-7571-3.
- Chan, C. C.; Chau, K. T. (2001). Modern Electric Vehicle Technology. Oxford University Press. ISBN 978-0-1985-0416-0.
- Chau, K. T. (2015). Electric Vehicle Machines and Drives: Design, Analysis and Application. John Wiley & Sons. ISBN 978-1-1187-5261-6.
- Dorf, Richard C. (2001). Technology, Humans, and Society: Toward a Sustainable World. San Diego: Elsevier. ISBN 978-0-08-051865-7.
- Edgar, Julian (2018). Modifying the Aerodynamics of Your Road Car. David and Charles. ISBN 978-1-78711-823-2.
- Eisler, Matthew N. (2022). Age of Auto Electric: Environment, Energy, and the Quest for the Sustainable Car. MIT Press. ISBN 978-0-2623-7203-9.
- Fessler, David C. (2019). The Energy Disruption Triangle: Three Sectors That Will Change How We Generate, Use, and Store Energy. John Wiley & Sons. ISBN 978-1-119-34712-5.
- Fialka, John J. (2015). Car Wars: The Rise, the Fall, and the Resurgence of the Electric Car. St. Martin's Press. ISBN 978-1-4668-4960-0.
- Fletcher, Seth (2011). Bottled Lightning: Superbatteries, Electric Cars, and the New Lithium Economy. Farrar, Straus and Giroux. ISBN 978-1-4299-2291-3.
- Genta, Giancarlo; Genta, Alessandro (2016). Road Vehicle Dynamics: Fundamentals Of Modeling And Simulation. World Scientific Publishing Company. ISBN 978-1-8008-8013-9.
- Graham, John D. (2021). The Global Rise of the Modern Plug-In Electric Vehicle: Public Policy, Innovation and Strategy. Edward Elgar Publishing. ISBN 978-1-8008-8013-9.
- Hordeski, Michael F. (2008). Alternative Fuels. The Fairmont Press. ISBN 978-0-88173-596-3.
- "Hybrid Electric Vehicles". Popular Electronics. Vol. 16, no. 1. 1999. ISSN 1042-170X.
- Ingrassia, Paul (2012). Engines of Change. Simon and Schuster. ISBN 978-1-4516-4064-9.
- Katic, Vladimir A.; Dumnic, Boris; Corba, Zoltan; Milicevic, Dragan (2014). "Electrification of The Vehicle Propulsion System – An Overview". Electronics and Energetics. 27 (2): 299–316. doi:10.2298/FUEE1402299K.
- Kelly, Jason (2010). Financially Stupid People Are Everywhere. John Wiley & Sons. ISBN 978-0-470-57975-6.
- Khair, Magdi; Majewsky, W. Addy (2006). Diesel Emissions and Their Control. SAE International. ISBN 978-0-7680-4974-9.
- Kimble, David (2015). David Kimble's Cutaways. CarTech. ISBN 978-1-61325-173-7.
- Larminie, James; Lowry, John (2012). Electric Vehicle Technology Explained. John Wiley & Sons. ISBN 978-1-118-36112-2.
- Ledgerwood, Grant; Broadhurst, Arlene (2000). Environment, Ethics and the Corporation. Palgrave Macmillan. pp. 169–188. doi:10.1057/9780333981634. ISBN 978-0-333-98163-4.
- Marcus, Alfred A. (2019). Strategies for Managing Uncertainty. Cambridge University Press. ISBN 978-1-107-19115-0.
- Mi, Chris; Masrur, Abul (2017) [2011]. Hybrid Electric Vehicles: Principles and Applications with Practical Perspectives Principles and Applications with Practical Perspectives. John Wiley & Sons. ISBN 978-1-118-97053-9.
- Mildner, Roman; Ziller, Thomas; Baiocchi, Franco (September 26, 2025). Car IT Reloaded. Wiesbaden: Springer Nature. ISBN 978-3-658-47691-5.
- Nikowitz, Michael (2016). Advanced Hybrid and Electric Vehicles. Springer Publishing. ISBN 978-3-319-26305-2.
- Nilsson, Måns (2012). Paving the Road to Sustainable Transport: Governance and Innovation in Low-carbon Vehicles. Routledge. ISBN 978-0-4156-8360-9.
- Peddapelli, Satish Kumar; Virtic, Peter (2023). Wind and Solar Energy Applications. CRC Press. ISBN 978-1-000-83642-4.
- Pistoia, Gianfranco (2013). Lithium-Ion Batteries. Elsevier. ISBN 978-0-444-59516-4.
- "Popular Mechanics". Popular Mechanics. Vol. 173, no. 5. Hearst Magazines. 1996. ISSN 0032-4558.
- "Popular Science". Popular Science. Vol. 241, no. 1. Bonnier Corporation. 1992. ISSN 0161-7370.
- "Popular Science". Popular Science. Vol. 249, no. 5. 1996. ISSN 0161-7370.
- "Popular Science". Popular Science. Vol. 252, no. 5. Bonnier Corporation. May 1998. ISSN 0161-7370.
- Porter, Richard (2014). Top Gear; Epic Failures: 50 Great Motoring Cock-Ups. BBC Books. ISBN 978-1-8499-0820-7.
- Quandt, Carlos Olavo (February 1995). "Manufacturing the Electric Vehicle: A Window of Technological Opportunity for Southern California". Research Papers in Economics. 27 (6): 835–862. doi:10.1068/a270835. Archived from the original on March 30, 2024.
- Quiroga, Tony (August 2009). "Driving the Future". Car and Driver. Hachette Filipacchi Media U.S.
- "Ampersand". Road & Track. Vol. 47, no. 11. CBS Publications. 1996.
- "Road & Track". Road & Track. Vol. 48. CBS Publications. 1997.
- Taylor, James (2022). Electric Cars. Bloomsbury Publishing. ISBN 978-1-78442-492-3.
- Saad, Fouad (2016). The Shock of Energy Transition. Partridge Publishing. ISBN 978-1-4828-6495-3.
- Sherman, Joe (1998). Charging Ahead. Oxford University Press. ISBN 978-0-19-802551-1.
- Shnayerson, Michael (1996). The Car that Could: The Inside Story of GM's Revolutionary Electric Vehicle. Random House. ISBN 978-0-6794-2105-4.
- Wachenheim III, Edgar (2022). Common Stocks and Common Sense. John Wiley & Sons. ISBN 978-1-119-91324-5.
- Wakefield, Ernest Henry (1993). History of the Electric Automobile. SAE International. ISBN 978-1-56091-299-6.
- Warner, John T. (2024). The Handbook of Lithium-Ion Battery Pack Design. Elsevier. ISBN 978-0-443-13808-9.
- Welch, David (2022). Charging Ahead. HarperCollins. ISBN 978-1-4002-3360-1.
- Williams, Chris (2010). Ecology and Socialism. Haymarket Books. ISBN 978-1-60846-091-5.
- Wilson, Kevin A. (2023). The Electric Vehicle Revolution. Quarto Publishing. ISBN 978-0-7603-7831-1.
- Wiser, Wendell H. (2012). Energy Resources: Occurrence, Production, Conversion, Use. Springer Publishing. ISBN 978-1-4612-1226-3.
- Zhou, Chengke; Qian, Kejun; Allan, Malcolm; Zhou, Wenjun (2011). "Modeling of the Cost of EV Battery Wear Due to V2G Application in Power Systems". IEEE Transactions on Energy Conversion. 26 (4): 1041–1050. doi:10.1109/TEC.2011.2159977. ISSN 0885-8969.
