= Americans in Hong Kong =

Ethnic group in Hong Kong

- Traditional Chinese: 在香港美國人
- Simplified Chinese: 在香港美国人
Transcriptions
Standard Mandarin
- Hanyu Pinyin: Zài Xiānggǎng Měiguórén
Yue: Cantonese
- Jyutping: zoi6 hoeng1 gong2 mei5 gwok3 jan4

Americans in Hong Kong
在香港美國人

Total population
- 85,000 (2018)

Languages
- American English, Cantonese

Religion
- Protestantism · Catholicism · Orthodox

Related ethnic groups
- Chinese Americans, Hong Kong Americans, Americans

The United States consulate estimates there are about 70,000 Americans in Hong Kong as of January 2023, a drop from 85,000 since its 2018 estimate; no census by any US government organization has ever been attempted. They consist of both native-born Americans of various ethnic backgrounds, including Chinese Americans and Hong Kong Americans, as well as former Hong Kong emigrants of Chinese descent to the United States who returned after gaining American citizenship. Many come to Hong Kong on work assignments; others study at local universities. They form a large part of the greater community of Americans in China.

== History ==
The first Americans in Hong Kong were missionaries; their presence was noted as early as 1842, after the lifting of the ban on proselytisation due to the outcome of the First Opium War. In 1949, with the Communist victory in the Chinese Civil War, many American missionaries began to depart China for Hong Kong; they were formally expelled in the mid-1950s. At the same time, though, American missionaries in Hong Kong began to play an important role in implementing US policy there, participating directly in the distribution of aid and the recommendation and processing of refugees seeking to immigrate to the United States. However, the United States government itself was ambivalent towards the presence of Americans in Hong Kong; President Dwight D. Eisenhower once suggested restricting visas for Americans in Hong Kong to those who "really had an obligation" to be there, and indicated his reluctance to provide emergency evacuation to American citizens there in the event of an invasion by China.

Since the transfer of sovereignty over Hong Kong, Americans have arguably surpassed the British as the major non-Chinese influence. There are more Americans than Britons living in the territory, and 1,100 American companies employ 10% of the Hong Kong workforce; the former head of the Hong Kong General Chamber of Commerce, Eden Woon, was the first American to hold the position (1997–2006) in the territory's history. In addition, ships of the United States Navy formerly made from 60 to 80 port visits each years, although China ended this in 2019 after the American government passed the Hong Kong Human Rights and Democracy Act into law. The US Department of State estimated in 2004 that there were 45,000 American citizens living in Hong Kong.

In recent years, there has also been an increase in Chinese Americans coming to Hong Kong as exchange students or to work for a short time, or even to settle permanently. For example, in the 1960s, virtually all exchange students at the Chinese University of Hong Kong were European Americans, but in recent years, Chinese Americans have become one of the largest, if not the largest, demographic exchange student group. The trend of increasing Chinese American migration to Hong Kong has been especially notable in the entertainment industry, the earliest and most famous exemplar of the trend being Bruce Lee; in later years, actors such as Daniel Wu and singers such as Coco Lee, facing the perception of entertainment executives that Asians could not appeal to American audiences, went to Hong Kong in an effort to improve their career prospects. However, this type of return migration has not been practical for those in all professions; for example, Chinese Americans interested in going to Hong Kong as missionaries often faced barriers from church hierarchies. Additionally, Chinese-Americans often face stereotypes that they speak Chinese poorly, do not understand Hong Kong culture, and view themselves as superior due to their American upbringing.

== Notable people ==
- Jaycee Chan, American-born actor and singer
- Ronnie Chan, Hang Lung Group chairman, Asia Society Co-Chairman
- Kevin Cheng, American-born actor and singer
- MC Jin, American-born Chinese rapper
- Frank Lavin, former US Ambassador to Singapore
- Bruce Lee, American-born martial artist and actor
- Justin Lo, American-born singer
- Howard McCrary, American-born jazz pianist and singer
- Heather Parisi, American-born Italian dancer, singer and television personality
- Maggie Q, American-born actress
- James E. Thompson, founder of Crown Worldwide Group
- Daniel Wu, American-born actor
- Austin Brice, Major League Baseball pitcher
- Eden Woon, President of the Asian Institute of Technology, President of AmCham Hong Kong

== See also ==
- Hong Kong Americans
- Canadians in Hong Kong
- Hong Kong Canadians
- Hong Kong–United States relations
