= K. T. Chau =

Hong Kong engineering educator

Kam Tim Chau
- Occupation: Professor

Academic background
- Education: (B.S.) Hong Kong Baptist University (MEng) Asian Institute of Technology (PhD) Northwestern University
- Doctoral advisor: John Rudnicki
- Other advisor: Worsak Kanok-Nukulchai

Kam Tim Chau (born 1960) (周錦添) is an engineering educator. He is an adjunct professor at the Chinese University of Hong Kong and was the Chair Professor in Geotechnical Engineering at Hong Kong Polytechnic University and was the former President of the Hong Kong Society of Theoretical and Applied Mechanics. He authored three text books in geomechanics and engineering mathematics entitled "Analytic Methods in Geomechanics" (2013) published by CRC Press, "Theory of Differential Equations in Engineering and Mechanics" (2018) published by CRC Press, and "Applications of Differential Equations in Engineering and Mechanics" (2019) also published by CRC Press.

== Biography ==
Chau was born in Hong Kong in 1960. He received his senior diploma in 1983 and the honors diploma with distinction in 1984 from what was then Hong Kong Baptist College, now known as Hong Kong Baptist University. After working one year as a full time demonstrator/technician/tutor at the Hong Kong Baptist College, he went to the Asian Institute of Technology (AIT) in Thailand in 1985, studying structural engineering. He received his MEng (Master of Engineering) degree in 1987 and was awarded the Tim Kendall Memorial Prize number one in the graduating class of 1987), with straight As and an excellent thesis under the supervision of Professor Worsak Kanok-Nukulchai (the former President of AIT). After working for a few months as a research associate at AIT under Worsak, he went to Northwestern University in 1987 under the supervision of Professor John Rudnicki. He received a PhD in theoretical and applied mechanics in 1991. After another year as post-doctoral at Northwestern University, he joined what was then Hong Kong Polytechnic (now the Hong Kong Polytechnic University) in 1992. He has been serving there as a lecturer, assistant professor, associate professor, professor and chair professor. He is now an adjunct professor of the Earth System Science Programme at the Chinese University of Hong Kong. He was inducted to AIT Halls of Fame in 2019.
