= Xiaogang =

Xiaogang may refer to:

== People with the given name ==
- Feng Xiaogang, Chinese film director
- Ye Xiaogang, Chinese composer of contemporary classical music
- Zhang Xiaogang, contemporary Chinese symbolist and surrealist painter
- Yu Xiaogang, Chinese environmentalist
- Xiao Gang (born 1958), Chinese businessman

== Locations ==
- Xiaogang, Anhui (小岗村), a village in Xiaoxihe, Fengyang County, Chuzhou, Anhui, China
- Siaogang District (小港區), also spelled Xiaogang, Kaohsiung, Taiwan
