= University of Engineering & Technology, Peshawar =

University in Peshawar, Pakistan

Coordinates: 34.0027°N 71.4859°E

University of Engineering and Technology, Peshawar
- Motto: We Engineers, The Nation's Future!
- Type: Public
- Established: 1952
- Affiliations: Higher Education Commission (Pakistan), Pakistan Engineering Council, Pakistan Council for Architects and Town Planners
- Chancellor: Chief Minister of Khyber Pakhtunkhwa
- Vice-Chancellor: Muhammad Sadiq Khattak
- Dean: Rizwan Mehmood Gul
- Registrar: Khizar Azam
- Undergraduates: Nofel Qureshi
- Location: Peshawar, Khyber Pakhtunkhwa, Pakistan
- Campus: Urban
- Colours: Brown, earth yellow, copper
- Nickname: UET Peshawar
- Website: uetpeshawar.edu.pk

The University of Engineering and Technology, Peshawar (UET Peshawar), formerly known as NWFP University of Engineering and Technology, is a public university located in Peshawar, Khyber Pakhtunkhwa, Pakistan. Formerly known as NWFP University of Engineering and Technology until 2010, it is an institution of higher learning in Pakistan with a strong emphasis on the development of science and engineering. The university offers undergraduate and post-graduate programs in various engineering disciplines. The university is also a member of the Association of Commonwealth Universities of the United Kingdom. The university was regarded as one of the best engineering schools in the country and was ranked in 7th position nationwide in the category of "Engineering and Technology" by HEC, the highest governing body of higher education in Pakistan. According to Times Higher Education World University Rankings 2023, the university is ranked in 801-1000th worldwide and in 251-300th position in Asia.

== History ==
=== Name ===
In 1952, an engineering college was set up as a constituent college of the University of Peshawar with an enrolment of twenty students (according to the UET Peshawar Annual Report 2006 – 2007). This college was granted a charter to operate as an independent engineering university in 1980 under the name University of Engineering and Technology. It was officially known as the NWFP University of Engineering and Technology Peshawar until 2010 when the province name was changed to Khyber-Pakhtunkhwa (KP). Colloquially, it has been referred to as UET Peshawar since its establishment.

== Campus ==
UET Peshawar has five campuses. Peshawar campus is the main campus with four satellite campuses in Kohat, Abbottabad, Bannu and Jalozai.

=== Peshawar campus ===
The main campus is in the University Campus area, University Road, Peshawar. The Peshawar campus is the nucleus of the university. The following programs are offered in the Peshawar campus.

- B.Sc/M. Sc/Ph.D Agriculture Engineering
- B.Sc/M. Sc/Ph.D Architecture
- B.Sc/M. Sc/Ph.D Chemical Engineering
- B.Sc/M. Sc/Ph.D Civil Engineering
- B.Sc/M. Sc/Ph.D Computer Science & IT
- B.Sc/M. Sc/Ph.D Computer Systems Engineering
- B.Sc/M. Sc/Ph.D Electrical Engineering
- B.Sc. Electronics Engineering
- B.Sc/M. Sc/Ph.D Industrial Engineering
- B.Sc/M. Sc/Ph.D Mechanical Engineering
- B.Sc/M. Sc/Ph.D Mechatronics Engineering
- B.Sc/M. Sc/Ph.D Mining Engineering
- B.Sc/M. Sc/Ph.D Software Engineering
- B.Sc/M. Sc/Ph.D Telecommunication Engineering

=== Jalozai Campus ===
Jalozai Campus was inaugurated in December 2017 by Chief Minister Khyber Pakhtunkhwa and Governor Sardar Mahtab Ahmed Khan. The campus funded by HEC at the cost of Rs. 6,565,272 million PKR is established on Pabbi Cherat Road at 11 km Southwards from GT Road in Nowshera District. Total area of the campus is 162.6 ha (402 acres) and the total covered area is approximately 94,875.6 square metres (1,021,232 ft^{2}) with almost 3240 students. At present, Jalozai Campus is offering the following programs.

- B.Sc. Civil Engineering
- B.Sc. Electrical Engineering
- B.Sc. Industrial Engineering
- B.Sc. Mechanical Engineering
- Computer Science & IT

=== Abbottabad campus ===
The Abbottabad campus was inaugurated in October 2002 at the premises of the old Ayub Medical College. The campus has two departments, Electronics and Architecture. The campus started Electronic Engineering subjects for the first time in UET history. In this respect, its first Batch (2004 to 2008) is called the "Pioneer Batch". Similarly architecture was not only started for the first time in the history of UET Peshawar but also in history of Khyber Pakhtunkhwa.

Abbottabad campus is located in the heart of city surrounded by lush green lawns and tall trees. At the background, there is a mountain view adding more grandeur to the campus. The departments offers the following four- and five-year degree program respectively:

- B.Sc. Electronics Engineering (four-year program)
- B.Architecture, City and Regional Planning (five-year program)

In July 2025, UET Abbottabad launched its third academic division, the Department of Software Engineering, offering a comprehensive four-year BS program focused on software development, systems architecture, and computing ethics to address the nation’s expanding tech sector demands.

=== Bannu campus ===
The Bannu campus became operational in May 2002 at the premises of Comprehensive High School. The campus offers engineering in two technologies, i.e., Electrical and Civil Engineering. The campus is in the east of the city on D.I Khan Rd. Six batches have graduated from this campus under the accreditation of Pakistan Engineering Council.

=== Mardan campus ===
Mardan campus, inaugurated in 2002, is spread over 89,000 square metres (22 acres) of area and offers degrees in Telecommunications Engineering and Computer Software Engineering. It is one of the first satellite campus of UET Peshawar, which became a full-fledged university in March 2018.

- B.Sc. Telecom Engineering,
- M.Sc. Telecom Engineering
- PhD Telecom Engineering
- B.Sc. Software Engineering
- M.Sc. Software Engineering
- PhD Software Engineering
- B.Sc. Electrical Engineering(Communication)
- B.Sc. Electrical Engineering(Power)

=== Kohat campus ===
The Kohat campus became operational in March 2012 at the premises of Kohat University's city campus. The campus offers engineering in electrical engineering. The campus is situated on Pindi road, Kohat. Currently, the campus is offering - B.Sc. Electrical Engineering (Communication)

== Organization ==
UET Peshawar is a public university run by the provincial government. Admissions to the university depend on whether the applicants live in the Khyber-Pakhtunkhwa province. There are some quota categories that would enable students from the Federally Administered Tribal Areas (FATA) and other provinces of Pakistan to enroll.

The head of UET Peshawar is designated as Vice-Chancellor, appointed by the Governor of Khyber-Pakhtunkhwa and mandated to run the university. The Vice-Chancellor is Qaisar Ali.

There are several senior staff posts that report directly to the Vice-Chancellor. These include:

- Registrar of university
- Dean of university
- Director Finance
- Provost of university
- Director Post Graduate Studies
- Director of Works

The Department Heads for academic areas report to the Dean's Office.

== Academics ==
=== Departments ===
UET Peshawar offers Bachelor, Master and Doctoral degrees in engineering disciplines. Some of the main departments at UET Peshawar are:

- Department of Agricultural Engineering
- Department of Civil Engineering
- Department of Computer Systems Engineering
- Department of Chemical Engineering
- Department of Electrical Engineering
- Department of Mechanical Engineering
- Department of Industrial Engineering
- Department of Mining Engineering
- Department of Telecommunication Engineering
- Department of Electronics Engineering
- Department of Architecture
- Department of Computer Science and Information Technology
- Department of Basic Sciences and Islamiat
- Department of Mechatronics Engineering

==== Societies at UET Peshawar ====
Directorate of Clubs and Societies is the umbrella under which other clubs work including technical society and extra-curricular clubs. Drama Club (Stage), Hiking and Trekking Club, Environmental Club are major extra-curricular clubs. Programs such as dramas, debates, seminars, exhibitions and trekking, computing and computer game contests are arranged annually in the university. Other major technical society clubs include:

- Institution of Civil Engineers (ICE)
- IEEE UET Peshawar sub-section
- American Society of Mechanical Engineers (ASME)
- Institute of Industrial Engineers (IIE)
- Robotics and Automation Society (RAS)
- Institution of Mechanical Engineers (IMechE)

=== Ranking ===
UET Peshawar is ranked 5th in the field of IT/Engineering by the Higher Education Commission of Pakistan which is the highest regulatory government body of higher education institutes in the country.

=== Semester system ===
In 2004, UET Peshawar moved from an annual system of examination to the semester system. The system was brought by the vice-chancellor, Syed Imtiaz Hussain Gillani. There are two semesters in an academic year – Fall and Spring. Each semester consists of 18 weeks of teaching and two exams- mid term and final term. Mid term carries 25% and the final term carries 50% of the total in any subject offered in a semester. The rest of the 25% is awarded on the basis of class participation, assignments and quizzes. Fall semester starts around September, whereas spring semester starts around February.

=== Tenure Track System ===
In 2006, UET Peshawar introduced the Tenure Track System which is a performance-based pay system.

=== Selection Procedure ===
Being a public university with limited number of seats, entrance to UET Peshawar is competed nationwide by the brightest students annually. It conducts ETEA test for selection procedure each year. In 2016, about 15000 candidates appeared for the entrance test to undergraduate programs.

== Research Centers ==
The following centers at the university conduct researches which are funded by the government agency and HEC.

=== Earthquake Engineering Center (EEC) ===
Earthquake Engineering Center (EEC) is a multidisciplinary research and education center. Envisioned in 2002, the center became operational in June 2006. EEC was established with the aim of better understanding the seismic risk in the areas within the geographical boundaries of Pakistan and to conduct research and testing in the current construction practices in Pakistan for improving seismic resistance of structures in high seismic risk areas. In the aftermath of the 8 October 2005 earthquake in Pakistan, the center proved itself as a reliable and proficient institution that provided valuable suggestions and guidance to the government and non-government organisations involved in the reconstruction and rehabilitation.

=== National Institute of Urban Infrastructure Planning (NIUIP) ===
National Institute of Urban Infrastructure Planning, the brainchild of Murtaza Haider (Asst. Prof. McGill University 2002–2006, Assoc. Prof. Ryerson University (now Toronto Metropolitan University) 2006-current) is established at UET Peshawar with the grant of US$3.0 million from Higher Education Commission (Pakistan) (HEC) of Pakistan. Main focus of NIUIP is to address the persistent urban decay and research in improvement of urban infrastructure of Pakistan. Initial research focus of NIUIP is in:

- Infrastructure finance and planning
- Urban transportation planning
- Urban environment and energy planning
- Water supply and sanitation
- Solid waste management
- Spatial modelling and GIS

=== Center of Intelligent Systems & Networks Research (CISNR) ===
Center of Intelligent Systems & Networks Research (CISNR) conducts research primarily on smart grid and intelligent transportation systems based on wireless sensor networks and IoT devices. CISNR has several partnerships with different National and International organisations.

- HUAMET, NASYS China Holding Limited, China
- INSTECH Enterprises, Pakistan
- Webprenuer Academy, UK
- GOVCHINA International Information Technology Research Institute (Beijing), China
- Beijing Global Safety Technology Corporation Limited, China

=== U.S.-Pakistan Center for Advanced Studies in Energy (USPCAS-E) ===
USPCAS-E is a partnership between Arizona State University and two leading Pakistani universities: the NUST and the UET Peshawar. It is a major energy research project funded by USAID in Pakistan dealing with applied and joint research with UET Peshawar. Scholars who attends UET Peshawar are selected to attend Arizona State University for further studies on sustainable energy and photovoltaics. The students and faculty engages in experimental research on energy at Arizona State University labs under the supervision of professors to design, execute and analyse experiments in areas such as solar panels and batteries. They also take part in industrial visits to learn more about power generation mechanisms in the United States. Under the umbrella of the Higher Education Commission of Pakistan, the USPCAS-E at UET Peshawar conducts sustainable energy research, producing the next generation of technologies in the field of applied energy research.

=== Scalable Transmission of Adaptive Multimedia based on P2P (STAMP) Center ===
This center conducts research on P2P video transmission and data communication. STAMP, an open source modular P2P streaming system optimised for the networking conditions of Pakistan. Scalability in the context of STAMP refers to both scalability in terms of support for accommodating any number of users on the fly and also scalability in terms of support for the simultaneous transmission of different video quality levels.

== Academic linkages ==
UET Peshawar has joint research, faculty and student training and exchange programs with foreign universities including Arizona State University, Asian Institute of Technology (Thailand), Strathclyde University (UK), McGill University (Canada), George Washington University (United States), University of Petronas (Malaysia) and University of Liverpool (UK). In 2016, MoU was signed between UET Peshawar and Arizona State University to exchange students under the program of US-Pakistan Center for Advanced Studies in Energy (USPCAS-E). Students from UET Peshawar spend a semester in the United States to carry out energy research at the laboratories of Arizona State University. The exchange visits, coordinated through the USAID-funded US-Pakistan Centers for Advanced Studies in Energy (USPCAS-E), provides faculty the opportunity to upgrade their teaching and corporate-partnership skills and offers the students of UET Peshawar an opportunity to enhance their research skills and industry awareness.

=== Research areas ===
The research activities at UET Peshawar include:

- Mechanical design
- Design of earthquake resisting structures
- Mining techniques
- Processing of low grade industrial minerals and metallic ores
- Environmental management
- Water resources management
- Application of computers in engineering.

=== Library ===
The university library contains a collection of books and manuscripts related to engineering and computing disciplines. The library allows students access to electronic journals under a “Digital Library Program”, a Higher Education Council (HEC) funded project for both public and private universities. Moreover, the university provides free books to the students for a semester period.

== Student life ==
The university provides on-campus accommodation, with separate hostels for male and female students and a separate hostel for international students. The campus includes several playing fields and facilities for sports such as football, cricket, basketball, badminton, tennis and handball.

== Notable alumni ==
- Mahmood Khan Achakzai, Politician and Co-founder of Pakhtunkhwa Milli Awami Party
- Iqbal Zafar Jhagra, Politician and former Governor of Khyber Pakhtunkhwa
- Sardar Ali Takkar, Pashto singer and musician
- Arshad Iqbal, Cricketer
- Imtiaz Gilani, Prominent civil engineer, former Vice Chancellor of UET Peshawar (2004–2016), and former provincial minister
- Amir Muqam, Politician
- Javed Afridi, Businessman CEO of Haier Pakistan and owner of the Peshawar Zalmi
- Pervez Khattak, Former Chief Minister of Khyber Pakhtunkhwa and former Federal Minister for Defense
- Mohammad Mohsin, American cricketer

== Development projects ==
UET Peshawar's development projects portfolio crossed 2 billion rupees in 2006–2007, according to the UET Peshawar Annual Report 2006 – 2007). Some of the key development projects that UET Peshawar is working on include:

- National Institute of Urban Infrastructure Planning (NIUIP, Pakistan):
  - Funding agency: Higher Education Commission of Pakistan
  - Funding amount: Pakistani Rupees 174 million
  - Funding purpose: to establish a new institute
- Institute of Mechatronics Engineering:
  - Funding agency: Higher Education Commission of Pakistan
  - Funding amount: Pakistani Rupees 148 million
  - Funding purpose: to establish a new institute
- Earthquake Engineering Center:
  - Funding agency: Higher Education Commission of Pakistan
  - Funding amount: Pakistani Rupees 487 million
  - Funding purpose: upgrade the Earthquake Engineering Center
- Department of Industrial Engineering:
  - Funding agency: Higher Education Commission of Pakistan
  - Funding amount: Covered under "Strengthening and Updating of Peshawar Campus"
  - Funding purpose: to establish a new department
- Gemstone Development Center:
  - Funding agency: Higher Education Commission of Pakistan
  - Funding amount: Pakistani Rupees 33 million
  - Funding purpose: to establish a research facility within the Mining Engineering Department
- New campus site near Jallozai, Peshawar: submission of PC-1 for this 405 acres (1.64 km^{2}) campus is under way.
  - Funding agency: unknown
  - Funding amount: unknown
  - Funding purpose: to establish a new main campus and move existing main Peshawar campus to a 405 acres (1.64 km^{2}) site near Jallozai, Peshawar
- Continuing Engineering Education Center:
  - Funding agency: Higher Education Commission of Pakistan
  - Funding amount: Pakistani Rupees 25 million
  - Funding purpose: to establish a center for professional development of faculty
- Strengthening and updating of Peshawar Campus:
  - Funding agency: Higher Education Commission of Pakistan
  - Funding amount: Pakistani Rupees 479 million
  - Funding purpose: capacity building, constructing department of Industrial Engineering and Human Resources Department for faculty members training and higher education in foreign countries.
- New co-ed hostel:
  - Funding agency: Higher Education Commission of Pakistan
  - Funding amount: Pakistani Rupees 37 million
  - Funding purpose: to establish an on-campus residence for co-ed students
