= National Institute of Urban Infrastructure Planning =

Pakistani research institute

National Institute of Urban Infrastructure Planning, the brainchild of Dr. Murtaza Haider (Ast. Prof. McGill University 2002–2006, Asoc. Prof. Ryerson University (now Toronto Metropolitan University) 2006–current) is established at University of Engineering and Technology (Peshawar) (UET, Peshawar) with the grant of US$3.0 million from Higher Education Commission (HEC) of Pakistan. Main focus of NIUIP is to address the persistent urban decay and research in improvement of urban infrastructure of Pakistan.

== History ==
In December 2003, Professor Haider, attended the Urban Research Symposium in Washington, DC, which was organized by the World Bank. The interactions with urban planners and engineers from the developing countries gave birth to the idea of establishing a new infrastructure planning institute in Pakistan. Later in June and July 2004, Professor Haider visited the National Institute of Urban Affairs, India and the National Institute of Public Finance and Policy, India, both located in New Delhi, to learn from the experience of Indian planners.

Professor Haider contacted UET Peshawar and the HEC with suggestions to address Pakistan’s urban challenges in a systematic manner. Dr. Sohail Naqvi, executive director of the HEC, was equally concerned about the urban decay in Pakistan. Professor Haider, who specializes in urban planning and is also an alumnus of UET Peshawar, offered his assistance and Canadian expertise in establishing a National Institute of Urban Infrastructure Planning to be based at UET Peshawar. HEC engaged Professor Haider under the reverse brain drain program to develop the detail proposal for NIUIP. In the start of 2005 HEC approved the proposal and NIUIP was formally established at UET, Peshawar.

== Objectives ==
Main objectives of formation of NIUIP are to:

- Undertake research in challenges faced by rapidly deteriorating urban centers of Pakistan
- Transform it into a centre of excellence for research and training in urban infrastructure planning in Pakistan
- Train and educate Doctoral and Master students by providing opportunities for research in an applied and problem-solving environment
- Train planning professionals
- Develop collaboration with other such international research institutes

== Research linkages ==
In September 2005, a Memorandum of Understanding was signed between McGill and NIUIP, UET Peshawar for cooperation through activities as:

- Exchange of faculty and/or staff
- Joint research activities and publications
- Participation in seminars and academic meetings
- Special short-term academic programs

== Faculty development and research areas ==
Initial research focus of NIUIP is in:

- Infrastructure finance and planning
- Urban transportation planning
- Urban environment and energy planning
- Water supply and sanitation
- Solid waste management
- Spatial modeling and GIS
