= Nang Phyu Phyu Lin =

- နန်းဖြူဖြူလင်း
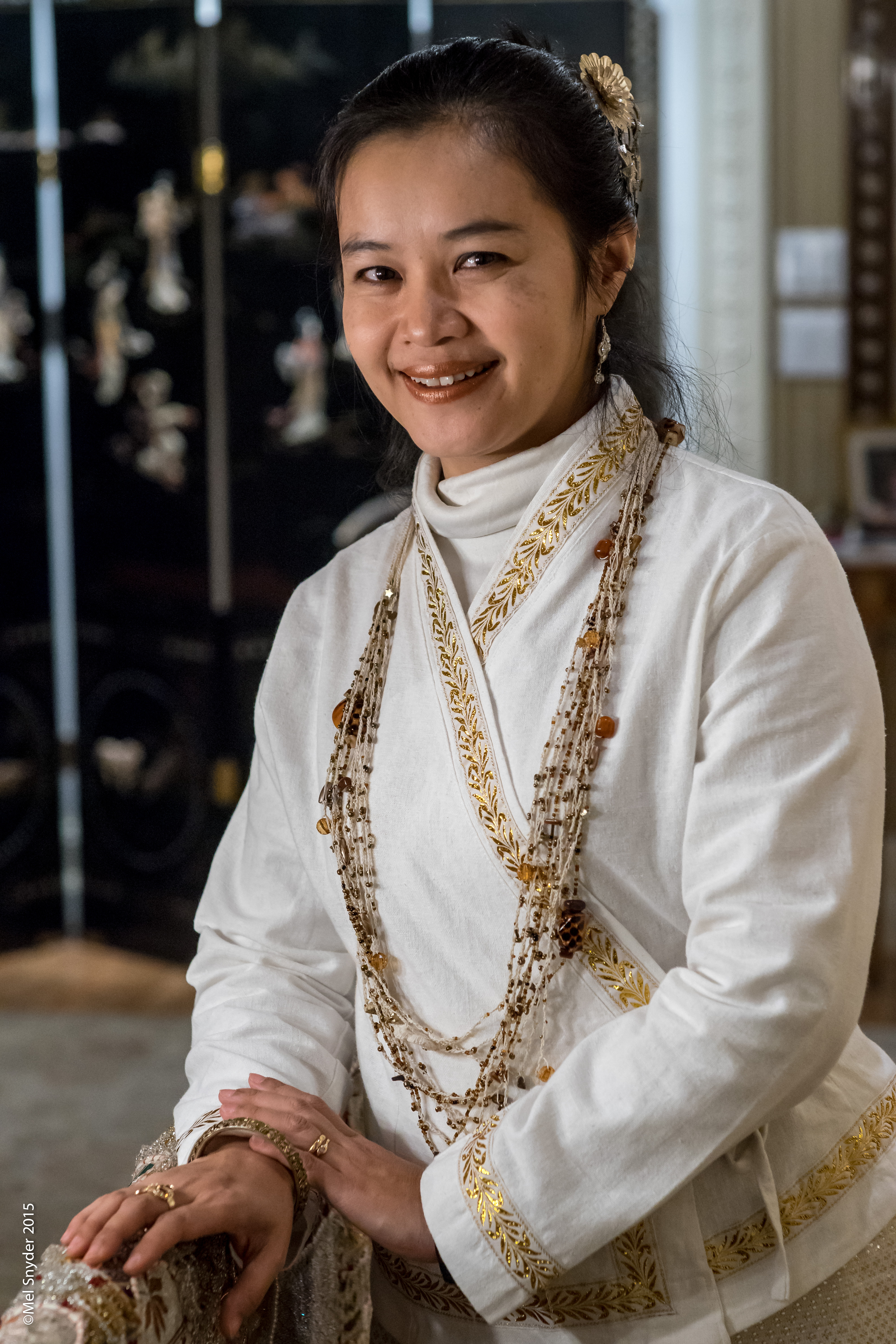
- Born: Taunggyi, Shan State, Myanmar
- Occupations: Women's rights activist, peace advocate

Nang Phyu Phyu Lin (Burmese: နန်းဖြူဖြူလင်း) is an ethnic Shan and Kachin women's rights activist and gender equality advocate from Myanmar. She has been actively involved in promoting women's participation in peace processes and advocating for gender inclusion in Myanmar's political transition.

== Early life and education ==
Nang Phyu Phyu Lin is an ethnic Shan and Kachin woman originally from Taunggyi, the capital of Shan State. She holds a Master of Science in Gender & Development from the Asian Institute of Technology (2005), and an MBA from the Institute of Economics in Myanmar (2013). Currently, she is a Ph.D. candidate in Organizational Development at Assumption University in Thailand.

== Activism ==
Since 2010, Nang Phyu Phyu Lin has been engaged in Myanmar's peace process, focusing on integrating gender perspectives into peacebuilding efforts. In 2014, she co-founded the Alliance for Gender Inclusion in the Peace Process (AGIPP), a coalition of organizations working to ensure that women's perspectives and needs are integrated into the country's ongoing peace negotiations. She has served as the chairperson and is currently the National Advisor for AGIPP. In 2018, she participated in the Third Session of the Union Peace Conference – 21st Century Panglong, where she discussed gender equality.

In 2023, she participated in the GenderLab Talk Series #4, discussing "Gender Equality and Federalism in Myanmar". Nang Phyu Phyu Lin is known for challenging the perception that peace negotiations are solely about men and weapons. She advocates for at least a 30% quota for women in decision-making roles, aiming to increase women's representation in political processes.

In 2015, Nang Phyu Phyu Lin was recognized by the Inclusive Security organization as one of the "17 Women Who Are Changing the World" for her efforts in advocating for women's inclusion in peace processes. In 2016, she was featured by The Irrawaddy as one of the "Inspiring Women of Burma" and "Myanmar's Movers and Shakers" in 2017.
