= Imtiaz Gilani =

Pakistani politician

- Born: 27 December 1947 (age 78); Kohat, Khyber-Pakhtunkhwa, Pakistan
- Citizenship: Pakistan
- Education: University of Engineering and Technology (Peshawar); Asian Institute of Technology; Rutgers University
- Known for: Educationist of Pakistan
- Scientific career
- Fields: Civil and Structural Engineering
- Workplaces: Provisional Minister of Education of Khyber-Pakhtunkhwa; Ambar Prefab Inc. University of Engineering and Technology (Peshawar)

Imtiaz Gilani is a Pakistani civil engineer and a vice chancellor of the University of Engineering and Technology (Peshawar), Pakistan from 2004 till 2016. Imtiaz Gilani was Minister for Education, Information, Youth, Tourism and Culture (1999-2003) and acting executive director of the Higher Education Commission (HEC) of Pakistan (2012 - 2013).

== Early life and education ==
Imtiaz Gilani was born on 27 December 1947, in the small town of Kohat to a Syed family. His early years were spent studying in St. Joseph's Convent School, Kohat and from 1959 to 1964 in Cadet College, Hasanabdal. In 1964, he attended University of Engineering and Technology (Peshawar) and completed his B.Sc. in Civil Engineering in 1968. He then did his M.Sc. in Structural Engineering in 1969 and specialized in structural engineering in 1971 from the Asian Institute of Technology, Bangkok, Thailand. In 1978, he attended Rutgers University, and in 1981 received his Master of Business Administration in Finance, from Rutgers Graduate School of Management.

== Career ==
Gilani worked with Barnett and Herenchak, Inc. Consulting Engineers, Broad Street, New Jersey, USA as a Design Engineer on civil engineering projects and then as a site engineer from 1972 till 1973.

From 1973- 1981 he worked as a project engineer at Sverdrup and Parcel, Inc., Consulting Engineers (New York, USA) where his principal area of concentration included designing and supervision of mass transit facilities such as subways, subway stations and mono-rail systems.

Imtiaz Gilani is also the managing director of Ambar Prefab (Pvt) from 1981 on.
