= Eden Woon =

American academic and businessman

Eden Woon Yi-Teng

8th President of Asian Institute of Technology
- In office September 1, 2018 – September 1, 2022
- Preceded by: Worsak Kanok-Nukulchai
- Succeeded by: Kazuo Yamamoto (interim)

Personal details
- Born: 1947 (age 78–79) Shanghai, Republic of China
- Education: University of Iowa (BA); University of Washington (BS), (MS), (PhD)

Military service
- Branch/service: United States Air Force
- Years of service: -1993
- Rank: Colonel

Eden Woon is an American academic, former military officer, and businessman. Woon is president of the American Chamber of Commerce in Hong Kong, beginning September 1, 2022.

Woon was formerly President of the Asian Institute of Technology, a graduate university located outside Bangkok, Thailand.

Woon was born in Shanghai in 1947, moving to Hong Kong in 1949. Woon served in the US Air Force, including a posting at the US Embassy in Beijing from 1983 to 1985, retiring as a Colonel in 1993. He was CEO of the Hong Kong General Chamber of Commerce from 1997 to 2006, and later served as Vice President of Hong Kong University of Science and Technology.
