= Tweet (social media) =

Post on X (formerly Twitter)

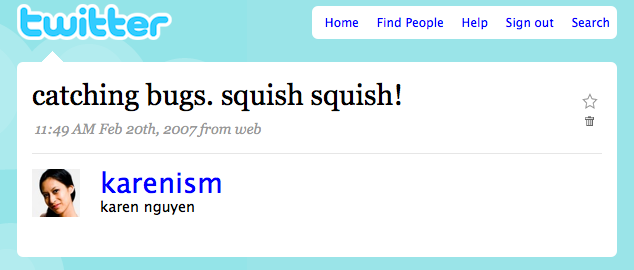
A user tweeting about bugs

A tweet is a short post (or "micropost") on the social network X, formerly known as Twitter. Tweets can include images, videos, GIFs, straw polls, hashtags, mentions, and hyperlinks. Around 80% of all tweets are made by 10% of users, averaging 138 tweets per month, with the median user making only two tweets per month.

Following the acquisition of Twitter by Elon Musk in October 2022, and rebranding of the platform as X in July 2023, all references to the word "tweet" were removed from the service, changed to a straightforward "post", and "retweet" changed to "repost"; the terms "tweet" and "retweet" are still more popular when referring to posts on X, however.

== Content ==
The service has experimented with changing how tweets work over the years to attract more users and to keep them on the site. Tweets were limited to 140 characters when Twitter started in 2006. Since 2017, a tweet can contain up to 280 characters and included media does not count toward the character limit. Users subscribed to X Premium (formerly Twitter Blue) can post up to 25,000 characters and can include bold and italic styling.

=== Character limit ===
Tweets originally were limited to 140 characters when Twitter was launched in 2006. Twitter was originally designed to be used on SMS text messages, which are limited to 160 characters. Twitter reserved 20 characters for the username, leaving 140 characters for the post. The original limit was seen as an iconic fixture of the platform, encouraging "speed and brevity".

Increasing the limit had been a topic of discussion inside the company for years, and had been resurfaced in 2015 for ways to grow the userbase. At the time, internal discussion also involved excluding links and mentions from the character limit. By January 2016, an internal product named "Beyond 140" was in development, targeting Q1 of the same year for expanding tweet limits. By the end of 2015, the company was moving close to introducing a 5,000 or 10,000 character limit. An unfinalized version had tweets that went over the old 140 character threshold only showing the first 140 characters, with a call-to-action that there was more in the tweet. Clicking on the tweet would reveal the rest, which was done to retain the same feel of the timeline.

The change was controversial internally and met with backlash by users. Dorsey confirmed that the 140 character limit would remain, but had told employees upon his return as CEO that the once-sacred aspects of Twitter were no longer untouchable.

In May 2016, a week after being leaked, Twitter announced that media attachments (images, GIFs, videos, polls, quote tweets) nor mentions in replies would no longer increase the character limit to be rolled out later in the year to ready developers. The changes rolled out in September, except for the @replies, which were tested in October and then rolled out in March 2017, a year after the original announcement. These changes were a compromise to internal resistance to a 10,000 character limit from the year before.

On September 26, 2017, Twitter announced the company was testing doubling the character limit—from 140 to 280. It was an effort for users to be more expressive with their tweets, as users were otherwise cramming ideas into a single tweet by rewriting and removing vowels, or not tweeting at all. It began testing to a small group of users in all languages, excluding Japanese, Chinese, and Korean, because the three languages can say double the amount of information in one character. According to the company's statistics, 0.4% of tweets in Japanese hit the 140 character ceiling, while 9% of tweets in English hit the ceiling. Users not in the test group were able to see and interact with them normally.

The change was similarly controversial internally as the 10,000 character limit proposal. The immediate reaction by Twitter users was largely negative.

=== Links ===
URLs can be linked to on X. A tweet's links are converted to the t.co link shortener, and use up 23 characters out of the limit. The shortener was introduced in June 2011 to allow users to save space on their links, without needing a third-party service like Bitly or TinyURL.

=== Media ===
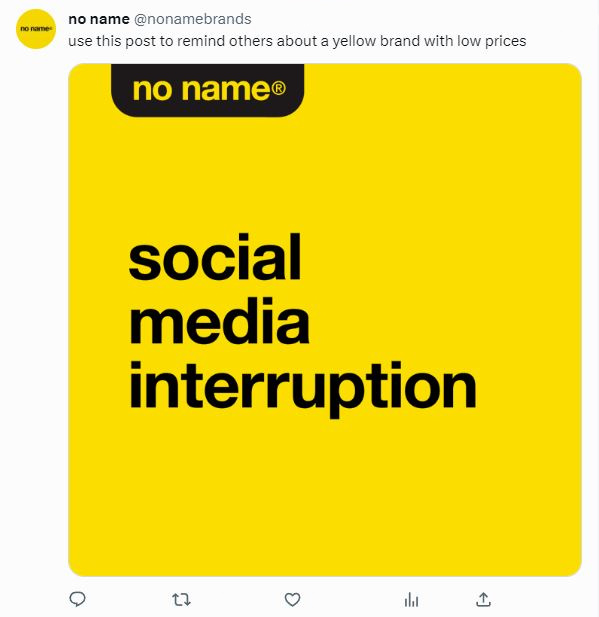
Media added to tweets appear with the tweet.

Some users use screenshots of text and uploaded them as images to increase the amount of words they could include in a tweet.

=== Cards ===
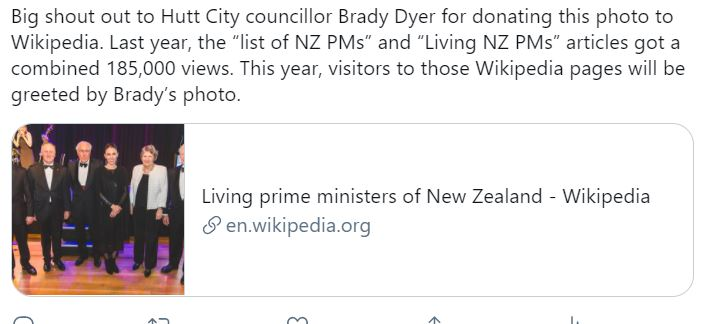
Some websites allow Twitter to grab metadata from the webpage linked to in a tweet, including Wikipedia articles.

Beginning in 2012, tweets linking to partnered websites would show, below the content of the tweet, expanded media: an excerpt of a linked news article or an embedded video. Twitter already had a way to see Instagram posts and YouTube videos, called "expanded tweets". Twitter then began allowing websites apply to test offering cards for Twitter users. Later in 2012, notably after Facebook purchased it, Instagram started cropping images displayed in cards, with the plan to end them all together.

=== CoTweets ===
Between July 2022 and January 2023, Twitter tested a feature where two users could be the author of a tweet, which would be posted on both of their accounts. Both users' profile pictures, names, and handles are shown. One user drafts a tweet in the Composer field, then invite a user that is both following them and has their account published. Edits could not be made once the invite was sent, with the alternative being deleting the invitation and making a second one. The second author could accept the invitation, at which the tweet would then be posted to both accounts. Once published, the second user could revoke them being a co-author, and the tweet would change to being written by the first author and being removed from the second author's tweets. Until the second author accepts the invitation, the tweet would be unlisted, not appearing on the authors' timelines or in searches, but available via a direct link.

It was tested with some accounts in the US, Canada, and South Korea. The company noted during the test that the feature may be turned off and all CoTweets deleted. The feature was spotted in code in December 2021.

On January 31, Twitter suddenly and quietly decided to stop new CoTweets from being made, though noted that it could return in the future. CoTweets were able to be seen for another month, before being converted to a normal tweet for the first author, and a retweet for the second author. Though Twitter's support page offered a generic reasoning for discontinuing the feature, Elon Musk said that it was to focus on allowing users to add text attachments.

=== Vibes ===
Twitter briefly tested a feature in 2022 that allowed users to set the current status—codenamed "vibe"— for a tweet or account, from a small set of emoji-phrase combinations. It would allow the user to either tag per-tweet, or on the profile level with it showing on tweets and the profile. Testing began on vibes in June 2022 with a wider selection that could be put above tweets, but disappeared after some time. Phrases included "✔️ Current status" and "💤 Case of the Mondays". Twitter removed the ability to add vibes to tweets.

== Interactions ==
Users can interact with tweets by 'retweeting' (reblogging), liking, quoting the tweet, or replying to it.

=== Retweets ===
In November 2009, Twitter began rolling out the ability to 'retweet' a tweet. Prior to this, people would write "RT @username" before quoting the original tweet. Some people limited their 140 character limit down further, so that other people could always fit their entire tweet in a proto-retweet.

In 2023, with the rebranding of Twitter to X, "retweets" were quietly renamed to "reposts"; however, "retweets" remained one of the most commonly used terms on the platform.

=== Liking ===
Tweets can be liked by users, adding them to a list that other users used to be able to view, prior to likes becoming private for all users. The feature was available when Twitter launched in 2006. Until 2015, 'likes' were called 'favorites' (or 'favs'). The service renamed them because people "often misunderstood" the feature, and people reacted more positively in user tests. Users had the option of hiding their likes from the public, though their like would not be hidden from the list of users who likes a given tweet. Jack Dorsey said in 2019 that, if he had to create Twitter over again, he would deemphasize the like, or not include it altogether because it did not positively contribute to healthy conversations.

Likes used to be public and they are not broadcast to the user's tweets timeline. When likes were public, users would often forget their likes were public or liked more revealing tweets. High-profile users and politicians' accounts have liked pornographic, hateful, and racist tweets. For instance, in 2017, Ted Cruz's account liked a tweet with a two-minute porn video about a day after it was posted. Cruz said that many people had access to his account and one of his staff members pressed the like button in "an honest mistake".

Likes would later be privatized for all users profiles, with Elon Musk stating "Public likes are incentivizing the wrong behavior", and encouraging users to like more Tweets without fear of being noticed. Likes are now anonymous, except to the author of the tweet, and to the person who liked it. Verified users could choose to private their likes prior to the update.

When not logged in, users' tweets are sorted by how many likes they received, opposed to reverse-chronological.

=== Quote tweets ===
In 2014, Twitter began testing a new feature that allows users to embed a tweet inside their tweet to add additional commentary. Prior to this, users could include a snippet of another tweet in a new tweet, but were limited to quoting the—at the time—140 character limit. It was originally called "retweet with comment", and was later named "quote tweet".

Following the rebranding of Twitter to X, quote tweets were renamed, simply dropping the "tweet" to become "quotes". The common name still largely remains "quote tweets".

=== Threads ===
Multiple tweets in reply to each other are grouped together in 'threads'. The 140 character limit prevented users from posting as complete thoughts as they desired, and resorted to making upwards of dozens of tweets, which all showed in a disjointed manner, dubbed a "tweetstorm". It was popularized by Marc Andreessen.

=== Bookmarking ===
Users are able to add a bookmark to individual tweets via the bookmark button, or within share icon menu, saving them to revisit them later. The bookmarks are private, but tweets display the number of times it has been bookmarked, if at all.

The development was revealed to in October 2017. The feature, highly requested by Japanese users, started from an annual hack week at the company and called "#ShareForLater". Previously, users would resort to liking the tweet or by sending it to themselves. Liking tweets is often seen as an endorsement or positive endorsement, and the likes are public and are notified to the user who made the tweet. The feature was tested in November for some users, and rolled out in February 2018 on mobile alongside a new share menu. The web version of Twitter did not test the bookmark feature until November 2018 When released, the user who made the tweet would have been unaware that a tweet was bookmarked.

== Fact-checking ==
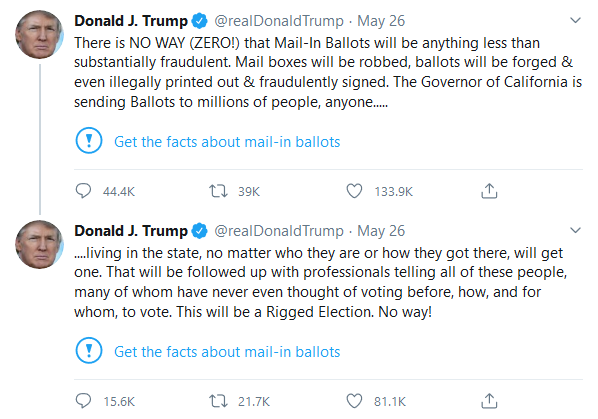
Donald Trump, months before the 2020 United States presidential election, falsely claiming that mail-in ballots are "substantially fraudulent" in two tweets. Both were applied labels that linked to Twitter's election resources center.

In March 2020, Twitter added a label to a manipulated video of then-candidate Joe Biden that Donald Trump retweeted. Two months later, as a result of the COVID-19 pandemic, Twitter introduced a policy that would label or warn users on tweets with COVID-19 misinformation. The company said at the time that other areas would have labels covered, and shortly afterwards, misleading information on elections were included.

On March 26, then-US president Donald Trump made two false statements about mail-in ballots, claiming they were "substantially fraudulent". Within 24 hours of the tweet, Twitter's general counsel and the acting head of policy jointly decided to label Trump's tweets, with several hours of internal debate from company leaders, and then-CEO Jack Dorsey signed off on the decision shortly before the label was applied. The labels, which told readers to "Get the facts about mail-in ballots", was the first time they were applied to Trump's tweets. A spokesperson for Twitter said that the tweets contained "potentially misleading information about voting processes and have been labeled to provide additional context around mail-in ballots". The label linked to articles by CNN, The Washington Post, and The Hill, as well as summaries of claims of fraud.

Three days later, a tweet about the George Floyd protests in Minneapolis–Saint Paul, in which Trump warned that "when the looting starts, the shooting starts", was hidden from view, having "violated the Twitter Rules about glorifying violence".

=== Community Notes ===
The logo of Community Notes

In the weeks after the January 6 United States Capitol attack, Twitter rolled out a new program that allowed users to add notes underneath tweets that would benefit from additional context.

Prior to the transfer of Twitter to Elon Musk, Community Notes were officially called Birdwatch.

== History ==
Jack Dorsey
(@jack)
tweeted:

just setting up my twttr

March 21, 2006

The first tweet, made by Twitter's co-founder Jack Dorsey, was made on March 21, 2006. It has the Snowflake ID of 20.

The Iconfactory was developing a Twitter application in 2006 called "Twitterrific" and developer Craig Hockenberry began a search for a shorter way to refer to "Post a Twitter Update." In 2007 they began using "twit" before Twitter developer Blaine Cook suggested that "tweet" be used instead.

"Tweet" was added to the Merriam-Webster dictionary in 2011 and to the Oxford English Dictionary in 2012. Both its use as a verb and noun were added. This was notable as the Oxford English Dictionary normally waits ten years after the coining of a word to add it to the dictionary.

In 2023, the terms "tweet" and "retweet" were quietly retired in favor of the terms "post" and "repost", as a part of Twitter's rebrand to X, but many users continue to use the former terms on X.

== Demographics ==
The median Twitter user tweets twice a month. Around 80% of tweets made are from 10% of the users, who tweet 138 times per month. 65% of the prolific users are women, compared to 48% of the bottom 90%. Most of the prolific users tweet about political issues. There is no difference in political views between the two groups. 25% of the prolific users use automated tools to make tweets, compared to 15% of the others.
