= John Rudnicki =

American engineering educator (1951–2026)

John W. Rudnicki (August 12, 1951 – October 4, 2026) was an American engineer.

== Early life and education ==
Rudnicki was born in Huntington, West Virginia on August 12, 1951. He studied at Brown University Mechanics from 1969 with a bachelor's degree in 1973, a master's degree in 1974, and a doctorate in solid-state mechanics with James R. Rice in 1977. Rudnicki was a postdoctoral researcher and lecturer in geophysics at Caltech.

== Career ==
Rudnicki's research interests included Inelastic behavior and failure of geomaterials, particularly deformation instabilities in brittle rocks and granular media, including their interactions with pore fluids, with applications to fault instability, quantification of energy radiation from earthquakes and environment- and resource-related geomechanics. From 1978 to 1981 he was an assistant professor at the University of Illinois Urbana-Champaign. He started at Northwestern University in 1981 as an associate professor. He received a full professorship in 1990 for mechanics, environmental engineering and civil engineering. He became emeritus in 2026.

He dealt in particular with the mechanics of geomaterials, especially local deformations such as the influence of local heating caused by deformation caused by friction and pore water during warping. Applications that he investigated include carbon dioxide storage in rock, energy storage and recovery, toxic waste storage, and earthquakes. From 2005 to 2010 he was one of the consultants of the Southern California Earthquake Center. From 1997 to 2010 he was a member (and chairman from 2008 to 2010) of the Geoscience Panel at the United States Department of Energy.

In 2006, he received the Maurice A. Biot Medal (for his fundamental contributions to the theory of porous media and application in rock mechanics and geophysics), in 2008 the Brown Engineering Alumni Medal, in 2011 the Daniel C. Drucker Medal and in 2013 the Caterpillar Prize for his paper "A multiscale DEM-LBM analysis on permeability evolutions inside a dilatant shear band" (co-authored with WaiChing Sun and Matthew Kuhn). In 2014, John Rudnicki received the Engineering Science Medal from the Society of Engineering Science (SES). A special symposium was organized by K. T. Chau at Purdue University during the annual conference of SES. In 1977 he received a prize for outstanding research in rock mechanics around the national US committee for rock mechanics. He became a fellow of the American Society of Mechanical Engineers in 2008.

In 2014, he published the book "Fundamentals of Continuum Mechanics" by Wiley.

== Death ==
Rudnicki died on October 4, 2026, at the age of 75.
