= Worsak Kanok-Nukulchai =

Thai structural engineer

- วรศักดิ์ กนกนุกุลชัย
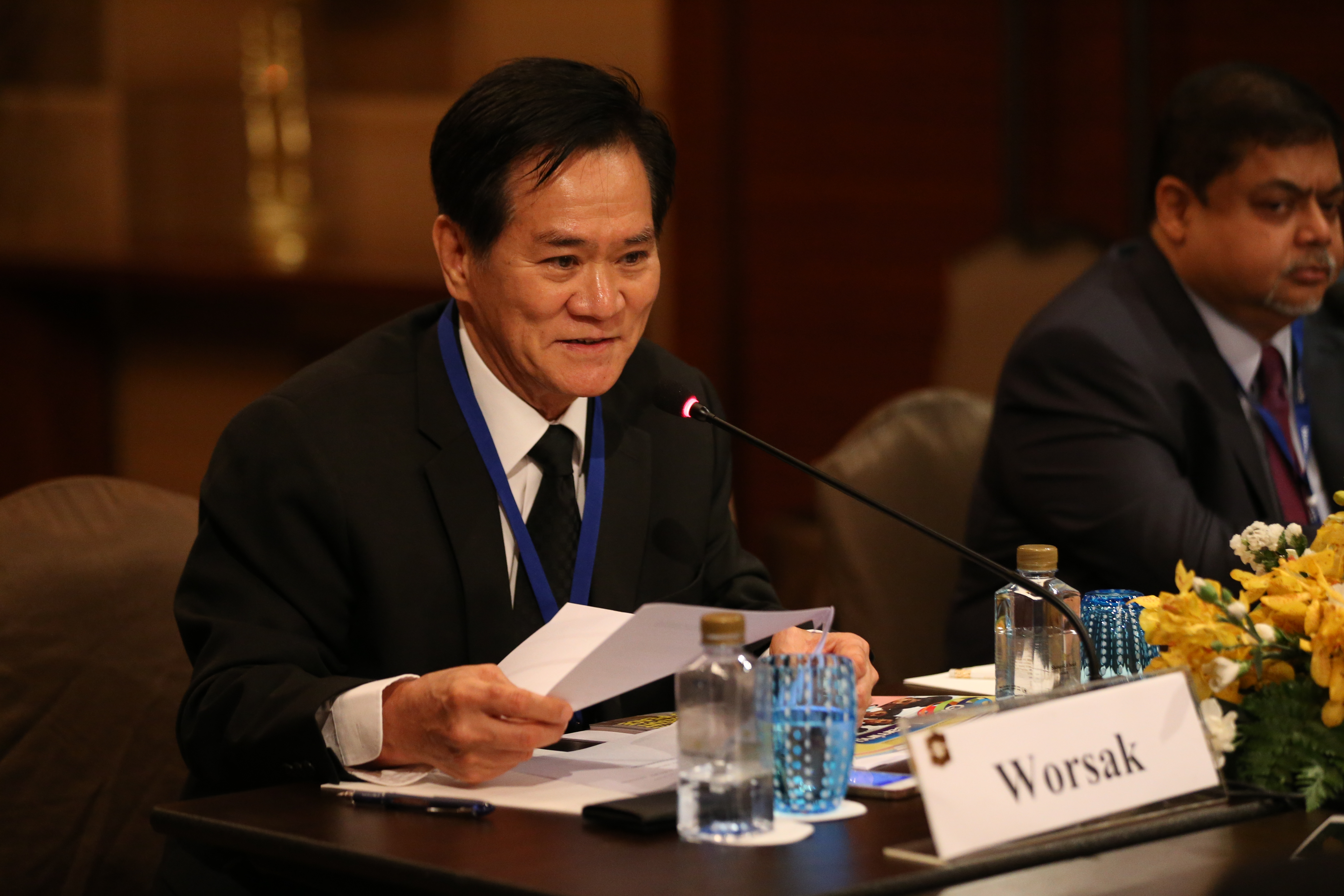

1st Executive Director of the Chulalongkorn School of Integrated Innovation
- Incumbent
- Assumed office 2020

7th President of Asian Institute of Technology
- In office 2014 – September 1, 2018
- Preceded by: Said Irandoust
- Succeeded by: Eden Woon

Personal details
- Born: 17 February 1948 (age 78)
- Education: Chulalongkorn University (BEng); Asian Institute of Technology (MEng); University of California, Berkeley (PhD)

Worsak Kanok-Nukulchai (Thai: วรศักดิ์ กนกนุกุลชัย, RTGS: Worasak Kanoknukunchai; born 17 February 1948) is a Thai structural engineer, university administrator and Professor Emeritus at the Asian Institute of Technology. He is currently the founding Executive Director of the AIT School of Professional Intelligence (AITSPIN), and has previously served as Founding Executive Director of the Chulalongkorn School of Integrated Innovation at Chulalongkorn University, and President of the Asian Institute of Technology (AIT) from 2014 to 2018, becoming the first Thai national and alumnus to become AIT's president.

Professor Worsak was inducted into the Royal Society of Thailand’s Academy of Science in 2016, the AIT Hall of Fame in 2019 and Chulalongkorn Engineers Hall of Fame in 2022. He is a Royal Scholar of the Royal Society of Thailand.

== Academic career ==
Prof. Worsak Kanok-Nukulchai earned his Bachelor of Engineering degree from Chulalongkorn University in 1971, followed by a Master of Engineering from the Asian Institute of Technology (AIT) in 1973. He later completed his Ph.D. in Structural Engineering and Mechanics at the University of California, Berkeley in 1978, where he was a Fulbright Scholar.

In 1979, Prof. Worsak joined the faculty of the Asian Institute of Technology (AIT) and rose to the position of Professor in Structural Engineering and Mechanics by 1987. Between 1984 and 1985, he served as Associate Professor at the University of Tokyo. From 1998 to 2004, he held the position of Dean of the School of Civil Engineering at AIT, and subsequently served as Dean of the School of Engineering and Technology at the same institute. He was Vice President at AIT from 2009-2013.

From 2014 to 2018, he served as the President of AIT, becoming the first Thai national and AIT alumnus to hold this position. He was appointed Professor Emeritus by AIT in 2018. From 2020-2024, he served as the Founding Executive Director of the Chulalongkorn School of Integrated Innovation at Chulalongkorn University.

== Awards and honors ==
Professor Worsak’s contributions to engineering and academia have been widely recognized. His notable accolades include:

• National Distinguished Researcher of Thailand (1999)

• Fellow of the International Association for Computational Mechanics (IACM, 2006)

• Recipient of the Fumio Nishino Medal (2008)

• Induction into the Royal Society of Thailand’s Academy of Science (2016)

• Induction into the AIT Hall of Fame (2019)

• Induction into the Chulalongkorn Engineers Hall of Fame (2022)

== Selected publications ==
- A simple and efficient finite element for plate bending International Journal for Numerical Methods in Engineering (1977)
- A finite element method for a class of contact-impact problems Computer methods in applied mechanics and engineering (1976)
- Book: An Introduction to Matrix Methods of Structural Analysis published by CRC Press (2024)
