= Yu Xiaogang =

Chinese environmentalist

- Education: Asian Institute of Technology
- Awards: Goldman Environmental Prize (2006); Ramon Magsaysay Award (2009)

Yu Xiaogang (Chinese: 于晓刚; pinyin: Yú Xiǎogāng) is a Chinese environmentalist. He was awarded the Goldman Environmental Prize in 2006 for his efforts in "creating groundbreaking watershed management programs while researching and documenting the socioeconomic impact dams had on local Chinese communities". He is among the six winners of the 2009 Ramon Magsaysay Awards, considered by many to be the Asian equivalent of the Nobel prize. He completed his Master's from the Asian Institute of Technology (AIT) in Thailand and his award citation says:

His (Yu Xiaogang) interest in the environment was cultivated during a stint in the Yunnan Academy of Social Sciences, and was further deepened when he attended the Asian Institute of Technology, where he earned a master's degree in watershed management.
