= Character limit =

Limit on the number of characters in a message

A character limit is a limit on the number of characters in a message which is used in SMS messaging and on text-based social media platforms.

Character limits usually lead to messages being shorter and users being forced to shorten messages through the use of abbreviations, emojis and acronyms.

The character limit originated with SMS messages which had a limit of 160 characters. This character limit was invented by Friedhelm Hillebrand in 1984, who determined that it was sufficient for most communications.

== On Twitter ==
The 160-character limit was adopted by Twitter when the site launched in 2006, 20 characters were reserved for the username, with 140 characters for the tweet. The original limit was seen as an iconic fixture of the platform, encouraging "speed and brevity".

In March 2017, the character limit on Twitter was changed so that media attachments or mentions in replies would not increase the character limit. In November 2017, Twitter increased its character limit from 140 to 280 characters.

In 2023, Twitter boosted the character limit for Twitter Blue subscribers. In February, it was increased to 4000. In April, it was again increased to 10,000, and in June, to 25,000.

== See also ==
- Characters per line
- Line length
- Tweet (social media)
