= Asian Institute of Technology =

University north of Bangkok, Thailand

Coordinates: 14°04′44.82″N 100°36′40.88″E

- สถาบันเทคโนโลยีแห่งเอเชีย
- Other name: AIT
- Former name: SEATO Graduate School of Engineering
- Motto: 'Social Impact with Innovation'
- Established: 1959; 67 years ago
- Affiliations: IAU, ASAIHL, GMSARN, ProSPER.Net, ACTU, ANSO
- President: Pai-Chi Li
- Faculty: About 100
- Students: 1,700+
- Location: 58 Moo 9, Km42, Paholyothin Highway, Khlong Luang, Pathum Thani, Thailand
- Website: www.ait.ac.th

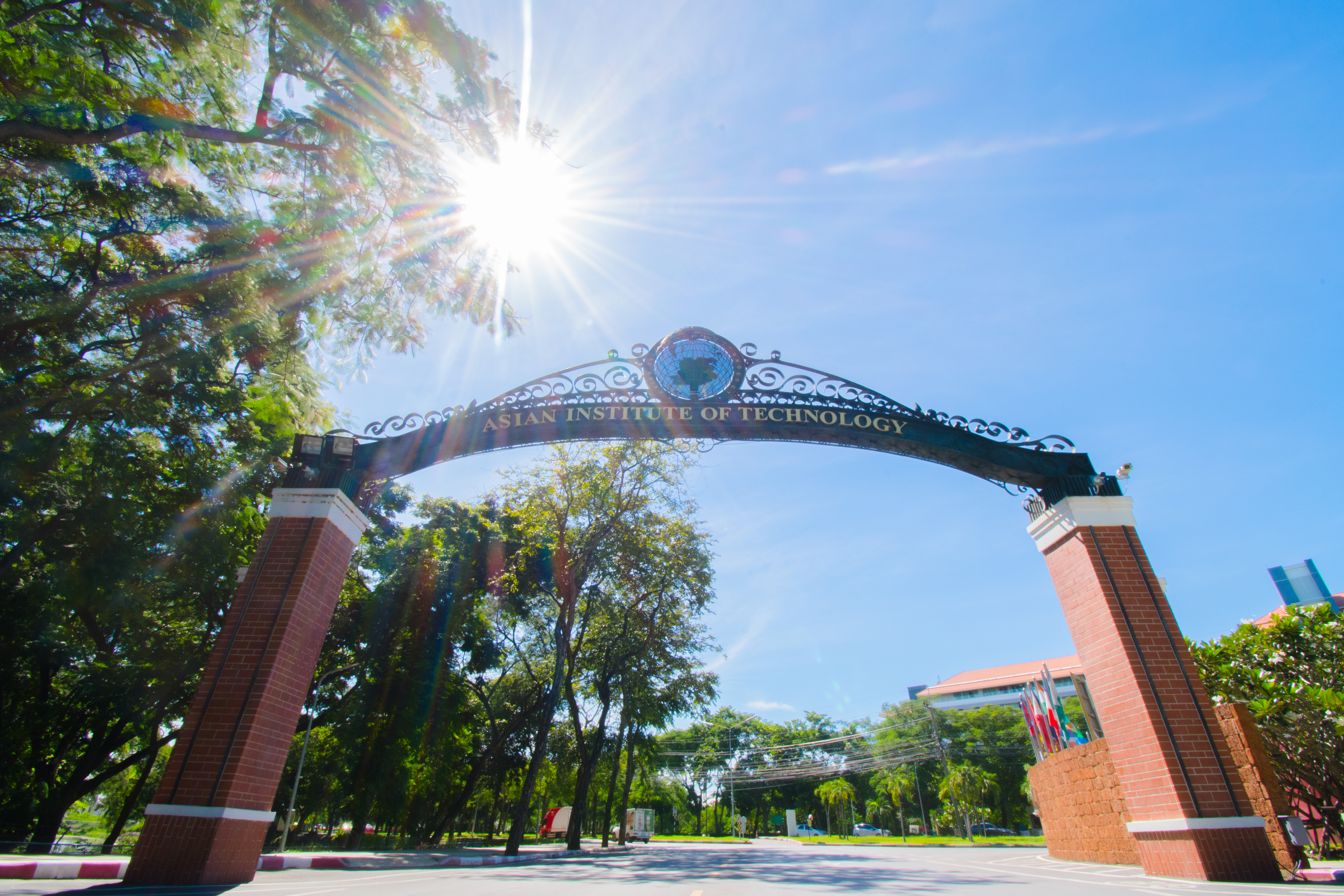
Asian Institute of Technology

The Asian Institute of Technology, formerly known as the SEATO Graduate School of Engineering, was founded in 1959. It is an international organization for higher education situated 40 km north of Bangkok, Thailand. It specializes in engineering, advanced technologies, sustainable development, and management and planning. It aims to promote technological change and sustainable development in the Asia-Pacific region, through higher education, research, and outreach.

== History ==
Founded in 1959 as SEATO Graduate School of Engineering, it receives funding from organizations and governments around the world.

In 1967, The Constituent Assembly of Thailand approved legislation for the Charter of the newly named Asian Institute of Technology in October. The Asian Institute of Technology Enabling Act was published in the Royal Thai Government Gazette in November the same year. AIT became independent of SEATO as an institution of higher learning empowered to grant degrees.

On 21 October 2011, AIT's campus was inundated by two-meter-high floodwaters. Since then, it has resumed operations.

AIT celebrated its 60th anniversary on 23–25 October 2019. Her Royal Highness Princess Maha Chakri Sirindhorn, the first royal alumna, presided over the celebrations on 24 October 2019.

In November 2019, AIT inaugurated the Belt & Road Research Centre.

== Governance ==
AIT has been governed by a board of governors since its beginning. Traditionally a high-ranking Thai citizen has been the chairman of its board of trustees. At present the chairman of the AIT Board of Trustees is Anat Arbhabirama.

Ambassadors of 14 countries – Bangladesh, Cambodia, Canada, China, France, India, Indonesia, Lao, Malaysia, Mongolia, Nepal, Pakistan, Sri Lanka, and Vietnam – are members of the AIT Board of Trustees. The ambassador of Japan and the ambassador to the delegation of the European Union to Thailand have observer status on the AIT Board.

== Ranking ==
In the 2021 Times Higher Education Impact Rankings (THE Impact Rankings), AIT ranked globally:

- 15th for SDG#1 No Poverty
- 58th for SDG#17 Partnerships for the Goals
- 64th for SDG#14 Life Below Water
- 67th for SDG#2 Zero Hunger
- 80th for SDG#15 Life on Land
- 100 - 200th for SDG#6 Clean Water and Sanitation
- 100 - 200th for SDG#11 Sustainable Cities and Communities
- 100 - 200th for Overall Impact

In the 2020 THE Impact Rankings, AIT ranked globally:

- 19th for SDG#1 No Poverty
- 86th for SDG#2 Zero Hunger
- 100 - 200th for SDG#6 Clean Water and Sanitation
- 100 - 200th for SDG#14 Life Below Water
- 100 - 200th for SDG#15 Life on Land
- 300 - 400th for Overall Impact

In 2020 QS Global MBA Rankings, AIT Master of Business Administration (MBA) program ranked 14th in Asia and 1st in Thailand. It also ranked 7th in Asia for Diversity and 18th in the world for Return on Investment.

In the QS World University Rankings by Subject 2020, AIT ranked 2nd in Thailand in Engineering and Technology, 151-200th in the world in Environmental Studies and in Architecture & Built Environment, and 201-250th in the world in Civil and Structural Engineering and in Agricultural and Forestry.

== Location ==
AIT operates as a self-contained international community at its campus in Pathumthani Province, some 40 kilometres (25 mi) north of Bangkok, Thailand. Besides laboratories and academic buildings, the main campus includes housing, sports, and medical facilities, a conference center, and a library with over 230,000 volumes and 830 print and online periodicals.

AIT was hosted by the Faculty of Engineering, Chulalongkorn University, Thailand, before it moved to its present campus in November 1973. Currently, it is located in the Rangsit area next to Thammasat University (Rangsit Campus), about 65 kilometers from the Suvarnabhumi Airport.

AIT has a remote campus called AIT Center in Vietnam. It was established in 1993 under the memorandum of understanding between the Vietnam Ministry of Education and Training and the AIT. At that time AITCV was the first international institution in Vietnam and the first AIT campus outside Thailand.

== Student body ==
AIT's student body comes from more than 50 countries, with Thailand contributing to about one-third. It has always been international, with international donors offering scholarships to AIT students for capacity building.

== Scholarships ==
Full Scholarships

- Royal Thai Government Scholarships (RTG)
- Loom Nam Khong Pijai Scholarships (GMSARN)
- Asian Development Bank - Japan Scholarship Program (ADB-JSP)
- Japanese Government Scholarships for Doctoral Degree in Remote Sensing & Geographic Information Systems and Mechatronics
- China Scholarship Council Government Scholarships (CSC)
- German Academic Exchange Service Scholarship (DAAD)
- INDEX International Group Public Co., Ltd. Scholarships
- BRIDGEX Scholarship for Structural Engineering
- WE Consultant Scholarships
- Joint Japan/World Bank Graduate Scholarship Program (JJ/WBGSP)

and others.

== Transition to intergovernmental organization status ==
=== Approval of new charter ===
In August 2010, a new "Charter of the Asian Institute of Technology (AIT)" was adopted and signed by the Ministry of Foreign Affairs of Thailand. Signatories to the new charter included Seychelles, Cambodia, Japan, Sri Lanka, Nepal, Pakistan, Sweden, Timor-Leste, Bangladesh, Philippines, India, and UNIFEM. The new charter came into force on 30 January 2012 as Sweden, Japan, India, Sri Lanka, Pakistan, Bangladesh, and Nepal deposited their instruments of ratification with the Ministry of Foreign Affairs of Thailand.

=== Difficulties and return to old charter ===
In 2012, Thailand declined to ratify the new charter, with the effect that the operations of AIT under the new intergovernmental charter resulted in the issuance of potentially invalid degrees. In December 2012, AIT opted to return to its previous national charter and ceased operating as an intergovernmental university. The degrees issued by AIT under the new charter were reissued under the old charter to avoid the risk of being unrecognized under Thai law. However, it seems that the "Charter of the Asian Institute of Technology (AIT)" remains legally in force without Thailand's participation and is in dormant status.

=== Listed among International Organizations by Thai Government ===
AIT is listed among international organizations by the Ministry of Foreign Affairs, Royal Thai Government.

== Host to international organizations ==
The campus of Asian Institute of Technology is host to several international and non-governmental organizations including the Regional Resource Center in Asia and the Pacific (UNEP RRC.AP) (www.rrcap.unep.org), and the Regional Integrated Multi-Hazard Early Warning System for Africa and Asia (RIMES) (www.rimes.int).

It also hosts the global secretariat of the International Partnership for Expanding Waste Management Services of Local Authorities (IPLA), while the regional secretariat is hosted by UN HABITAT. Four UN agencies, three international donors and five national governments are part of IPLA.

AIT has collaborated with Nobel laureate Muhammad Yunus to create a Yunus Center at AIT with an objective "to contribute to poverty alleviation by enabling rural people to handle and be in control of improving their own livelihoods". The Yunus Center at AIT was launched on 8 September 2009. Likewise, AIT hosts Ostrom Center for the Advanced Studies in Natural Resource Governance (OCeAN).

== Academic programs ==
Asian Institute of Technology offers Master's, Doctoral, and Certificate courses. Among the programs offered include regular Master's and Doctoral programs, Flexible Degree options, One-Year Master's programs, Professional Master's programs, Unified International Bachelor-Master programs, Capacity-Building PhD Partnership programs, Erasmus Programs, Exchange Programs, Joint Degree Programs and Dual Degree programs.

== Schools and Faculties ==
Beginning January 2026, AIT shifted to five Faculties and two Schools. The five Faculties are Faculty of Climate Change and Sustainability, Faculty of Civil and Environmental Engineering, Faculty of Public Policy and Sustainable Development, Faculty of Food, Agriculture, and Natural Resources, and Faculty of Advanced Science and Technology. The previous Schools, namely, School of Engineering and Technology, and School of Environment, Resources and Development have been converted into five Faculties. The two Schools are the School of Management and the AIT School of Professional Intelligence (AITSPIN).

== Former School of Engineering and Technology (SET) ==
The former School of Engineering and Technology (SET) was the combination of the two former Schools, namely, the School of Civil Engineering (SCE) and the School of Advanced Technologies (SAT), which merged in November 2005. Historically, the two schools came into existence only in January 1993 when the Institute reorganized the need to reform its academic structure from smaller-sized units called “Divisions” to larger bodies named “Schools”.

Since its inception, SET's mission was to develop highly qualified engineers and technologists who played leading roles in promoting the region's industrial competitiveness in its integration into the global economy.

Department of Civil and Infrastructure Engineering	Department of Industrial Systems Engineering	Department of Information and Communication Technologies
Construction, Engineering and Infrastructure Management	Bio-Nano Material Science and Engineering	Computer Science
Geotechnical and Earth Resources Engineering	Industrial and Manufacturing Engineering	Information Management
Geosystem Exploration and Petroleum Geoengineering	Mechatronics	Internet of Things (IoT) Systems Engineering
Structural Engineering	Microelectronics and Embedded Systems	Remote Sensing and Geographic Information Systems
Transportation Engineering		Telecommunications
Water Engineering and Management		Information and Communication Technologies
Disaster Preparedness, Mitigation and Management		Data Science and Artificial Intelligence

== Former School of Environment, Resources, and Development (SERD) ==
The former School of Environment, Resources and Development (SERD) was established by amalgamating the four Divisions, namely: (1) Environmental Engineering Division (2) Human Settlements Development Division (3) Agriculture and Food Engineering Division, and (4) Energy Division, in 1993. The name SERD was adopted after the EARTH Summit in Rio in 1992, emphasizing the important co-existence of environment and development.

SERD responded to regional needs by mobilizing and enhancing capacities for socially, economically, and environmentally sound development in partnership with public and private sectors. The School's interdisciplinary approach integrated technological, natural, and social sciences.

Department of Development and Sustainability	Department of Energy and Climate Change	Department of Food, Agriculture and Natural Resources
Development and Sustainability; Development Planning Management and Innovation; Gender and Development Studies; Urban Innovation and Sustainability	Climate Change and Sustainable Development; Sustainable Energy Transition	Agribusiness Management; Agricultural Systems and Engineering; Aquaculture and Aquatic Resources Management; Food Engineering and Bioprocess Technology; Food Innovation, Nutrition and Health; Natural Resources Management

== The AIT School of Professional Intelligence (AITSPIN) ==
In early 2026, AIT unveiled a new school, the AIT School of Professional Intelligence (AITSPIN) targeted professionals and focusing on applications of AIT in various professions. AITSPIN was officially inaugurated on 12 May 2026 by Thailand's Vice Minister of Foreign Affairs, H.E. Mr. Vijavat Isarabhakdi. AITSPIN is currently offering only one academic program called the Master of Science (Professional) in Professional Intelligence, a 36-credit professional master's degree aimed at working professionals, recent graduates, and employer-sponsored learners under the Shared HyFlew classroom model. The school is headed by former AIT President, Professor Worsak Kanok-Nukulchai.

== School of Management (SOM) ==
The School of Management was established in 1987 to meet the growing needs in Asia for graduate management education. Its goals are to impact the quality of management education and practices in the Asia-Pacific region and around the world, and to promote sustainable development, technological leadership, entrepreneurial spirit, wealth creation, and pride.

Students of SOM have the options of either studying at its campus located in Bangkok or on its self-contained international main campus located 40 km (25 miles) north of the city.

Programs under SOM
Business Administration
Business Risk and Resilience
Business Analytics and Digital Transformation
International Finance
Banking and Finance
Social Business and Entrepreneurship

== Inter-School Program ==
- Open Master of Engineering/Science in Interdisciplinary Studies (All Schools)

== Awards ==
=== Ramon Magsaysay Award ===
In 1989, AIT received a Ramon Magsaysay Award for Peace and International Understanding "for shaping a new generation of engineers and managers committed to Asia, in an atmosphere of academic excellence and regional camaraderie."

In 2009, an alumnus of AIT, Yu Xiaogang was also awarded the Ramon Magsaysay Award. The citation credited AIT and it said,

"Yu fell in love with nature early on, having been raised in Yunnan, a province of amazing beauty and home to three of the largest rivers in the world: Nu, Yangtze, and Mekong. His interest in the environment was cultivated during a stint in the Yunnan Academy of Social Sciences, and was further deepened when he attended the Asian Institute of Technology, where he earned a master's degree in watershed management."

=== Friendship Order of Vietnam ===
The Government of Vietnam awarded the Friendship Order to AIT in 2006. It is the highest award given in the area of international relations and is presented to foreign institutions and persons that have contributed to human resource training for Vietnam, and to the development of friendly relations between Vietnam and other countries.

=== Other Awards ===
AIT received the Science and Technology for Development Award from USAID and National Research Council in 1987. In 1994, it won the Development Management Award from the Asian Management Awards, while in 1996, it was awarded by the Danube Adria Association and Manufacturing (DAAM) International Vienna, Austria. In 2016, AIT won the gold medal from the Thai Research Fund (TRF) for bagging the most perfect scores (seven scores of '5' each) among all universities in Thailand.

== Sports ==
The AIT Grounds was host to World Women's T20 Cricket Tournament held in 2015 where eight countries played 10 matches. It is one of the three cricket fields in Thailand where Thailand's Premier League matches are played. The AIT Cricket Team has won the Bangkok Cricket League 'A' Division two times during the past three years.

It has a nine-hole golf course and a swimming pool. The campus offers facilities for badminton, takraw, table tennis, tennis, basketball, and volleyball.

== Memberships ==
1. International Association of Universities (IAU)
2. Greater Mekong Sub-region Academic and Research Network (GMSARN)
3. Association of Southeast Asian Institutions of Higher Learning (ASAIHL)
4. Promotion of Sustainability in Postgraduate Education and Research (ProSPER.Net)
5. China Education Association for International Exchange (CEAIE)
6. Alliance of International Science Organizations (ANSO)

== People ==
=== Students ===
70% of the students come from outside of Thailand. As an institute that prides in its international orientation, students at AIT come from all over the world. In August 2018, it had 1800 students from 45 countries. The Institute admitted students from 25 countries from North America, Europe, Oceania, Asia and Africa. Asian students constitute the majority of the student body, with Southeast Asia (Thailand and Viet Nam) and South Asia (India, Nepal, Pakistan, Sri Lanka) usually contributing the majority of students.

=== Presidents ===
Pai-Chi Li (from Taiwan) is currently the president of AIT, succeeding Kazuo Yamamoto (from Japan) on 1 September 2024. Previous presidents include Eden Y Woon (from Hong Kong), Milton E. Bender Jr. (from USA), Harold E. Hoelscher (from USA), Robert B. Banks (from USA), Alastair M. North (from Scotland), Roger GH Downer (from Ireland/Canada), Jean-Louis Armand (from France), Said Irandoust (from Sweden), and Worsak Kanok-Nukulchai (from Thailand). Prior to the institute becoming AIT, its predecessor, the SEATO Graduate School of Engineering had three Deans: Thomas H. Evans, Robert Holcomb, and Milton E. Bender Jr. (who also became the first President of AIT).

=== Faculty Members ===
AIT has 56 regular faculty members, with 27 in the School of Environment, Resources and Development; 30 in School of Engineering and Technology; and six in the School of Management.

In the School of Environment, Resources, and Development; 13 faculty members worked in Food, Agriculture, & Natural Resources, seven in Development and Sustainability, and five in Energy and Climate Change.

In the School of Engineering and Technology, 14 worked in Civil and Infrastructure Engineering, seven in Industrial Systems Engineering, and nine in Information and Communication Technologies.

=== Alumni ===
Prominent alumni in Thailand include Dr. Prasarn Trairatvorakul, former Governor of Bank of Thailand; Gen. Boonsrang Niumpradit, former Thai Army Chief; Dr. Somchet Tinnapong, managing director of Dawei Development Company; Dr. Prasert Patramai, Chairman of Board of TEAM GROUP, Mr. Chaiwat Kovavisarach, President and chief executive officer of Bangchak Corporation,; Somprasong Boonyachai, Director, Intouch Holdings, and Vice Chairman of Board of Advanced Info Service; Sumate Tanthuwanit, CEO, Ngow Hock Group, TIPS Co Ltd. Thai Prosperity Terminal Co., ltd., and Sintanachote Co.Ltd; Chaovalit Ekabut, Former President, SCG Investment and CFO Siam Cement Public Company Limited; Dr. Chainarong Na Lamphun, President and CEO, INDEX International Group; Preecha Ekkunagul, President and CEO of Central Pattana Public Company Limited; Vichai Bhucharoen, chairman, Board of Directors, GMS Corporation Ltd.; and Dr. Yanyong Phataralaoha, managing director, Thai Pipe Industry Company Limited;

International alumni include Mao Chi-kuo, Premier of Taiwan, Yu Xiaogang, winner of Ramon Magsaysay Award), Imtiaz Gilani, Provisional Minister of Education for the Government of Khyber Pakhtunkhwa; Rafiul Ahad, Vice President, Software Development, Oracle Corporation; Huỳnh Ngọc Phiên, President, AMATA Group; Phạm Lê Thanh, chairman, EVM Vietnam Electricity, Boun Oum Syvanhpheng, CEO, Électricité du Laos; Nadeem Amjad, Member (National Resources) Pakistan Agricultural Research Council (PARC); Muhammad P Aftab, Vice President, National Engineering Services (NESPAK); MALWILA DISSANAYAKE, Malwila Dissanayake, chair, Environmental Science, Lakehead College, Canada; Wachchi Patabendege Ranjith Premalal De Silva; Vice Chancellor, Uva Wellassa University; Dr. Bindu Lohani, former Vice President of Asian Development Bank; and Dr. Tong Ki Woo, Governor of Education, Daegu Metropolitan City, Korea, and former president of Yeungnam University; Nang Phyu Phyu Lin, Burmese women's rights activist.

== Notable alumni ==
Name	Degree	Degree Year	Notability	Notes
Boonsrang Niumpradit	D. Eng.	1978	Former Thai Army chief	
Mao Chi-kuo	M. Eng. (Community & Regional Development)	1975	Former Premier of the Republic of China	
Yu Xiaogang	M.Sc. (Interdisciplinary Natural Resource Development and Management)	1993	Among the six winners of the 2009 Ramon Magsaysay Awards	
Imtiaz Gilani	M. Eng. (Structural Engineering and Construction)	1971	Provisional Minister of Education for the Government of Khyber Pakhtunkhwa	
Bindu Lohani	Ph.D. (Environmental Engineering)	1977	Former Vice President Asian Development Bank	

== DOT th Domain Name ==
AIT administered .th, the country code top-level domain for Thailand until 2007 when the administration was transferred to the Thai Network Information Center Foundation.
