= AC Propulsion =

Automobile manufacturer in US

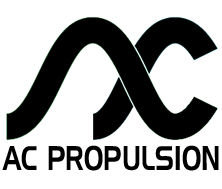
- Type: Privately held company
- Industry: Automotive company
- Founded: 1992
- Founder: Alan Cocconi
- Headquarters: San Dimas, California
- Key people: Wally Rippel and Paul Carosa
- Website: www.acpropulsion.com

AC Propulsion is a San Dimas, California, USA company founded in 1992 by Alan Cocconi, Wally Rippel, and Paul Carosa, that specializes in alternating current-based drivetrain systems for electric vehicles. It offers AC-induction traction motors. The company produces electric vehicle drive systems featuring high performance, high efficiency induction motors and integrated high power battery charging. Previously, they built an electric sports car, the tzero and the eBox, an electric conversion based on the Scion XB.

== History ==
Founder Alan Cocconi designed and built the controller used in the original GM Impact, which later became the GM EV1. ACP introduced the first AC-100 in 1992 and the AC-150 150 kW (200 hp) integrated drive system in 1994. The AC-150 has been used in a variety of applications such as the BMW Mini E, Foton Midi taxi and a USPS LLV demo vehicle. AC Propulsion was a pioneer in Vehicle to grid or V2G systems, with their second generation AC-150 drivetrain offering a bidirectional grid power connection.

The company works with automobile manufacturers such as Changan Automobile.

== Vehicles using an AC Propulsion electric drivetrain ==
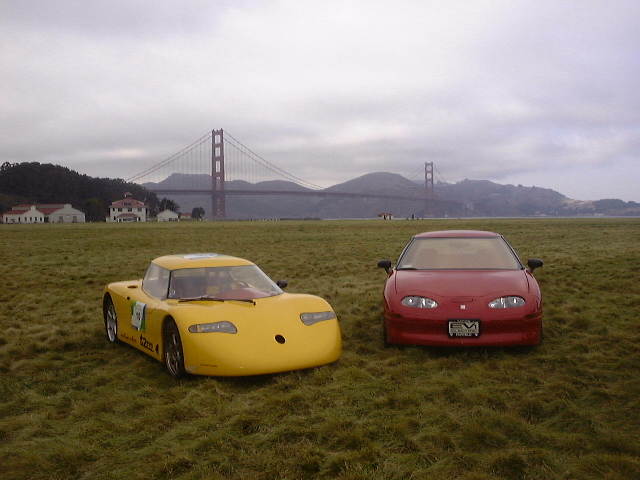
Yellow AC Propulsion tzero and red General Motors EV1

- AC Propulsion tzero
- AC Propulsion eBox
- Volvo 3CC
- Venturi Fetish
- Courreges EXE
- Courreges ZOOOP (with lithium polymer batteries)
- Wrightspeed X1 (based on the Ariel Atom)
- Mini E
- Peraves E-Tracer
- Toyota RAV4 EV
- Tesla Roadster (2008)

== Connection with Tesla Motors ==
Martin Eberhard and Marc Tarpenning had both taken test drives in the lithium-ion battery powered revision of the AC Propulsion tzero before founding Tesla Motors. Martin Eberhard encouraged Tom Gage and Alan Cocconi to move their prototype tzero into production. When they declined, in favor of working on their electrified Scion xB called the eBox, Martin Eberhard and Marc Tarpenning incorporated Tesla Motors to pursue the idea of building an electric roadster in the spirit of the tzero. Elon Musk later test drove the tzero as well, and he also encouraged AC Propulsion to commercialize the vehicle. Tom Gage again deferred, but put Elon Musk in contact with Martin Eberhard which led to Musk becoming Tesla Motors' first major investor through Series A funding.

Before Tesla Motors developed its Roadster's proprietary powertrain, the company licensed AC Propulsion's EV Power System design and Reductive Charging patent which covers integration of the charging electronics with the inverter, thus reducing mass, complexity, and cost. Tesla then designed and built its own power electronics, motor, and other drivetrain components that incorporated this licensed technology from AC Propulsion. Given the extensive redevelopment of the vehicle, Tesla Motors no longer licenses any proprietary technology from AC Propulsion.
