= Zoop (disambiguation) =

Zoop is a puzzle video game, similar to Plotting.

Zoop may also refer to:

- Zoop (social network), an American social media platform
- Zoop (TV), a Dutch soap opera about eight teens involved in nature
- Zoop (Iggy Arbuckle), a fictional character in the animated children's series Iggy Arbuckle
- ZOOP, Titan Industries brand which sells children's watches

== See also ==
- Courreges ZOOOP, an electric car
