= Electric vehicle conversion =

Changing a combustion automobile into an EV

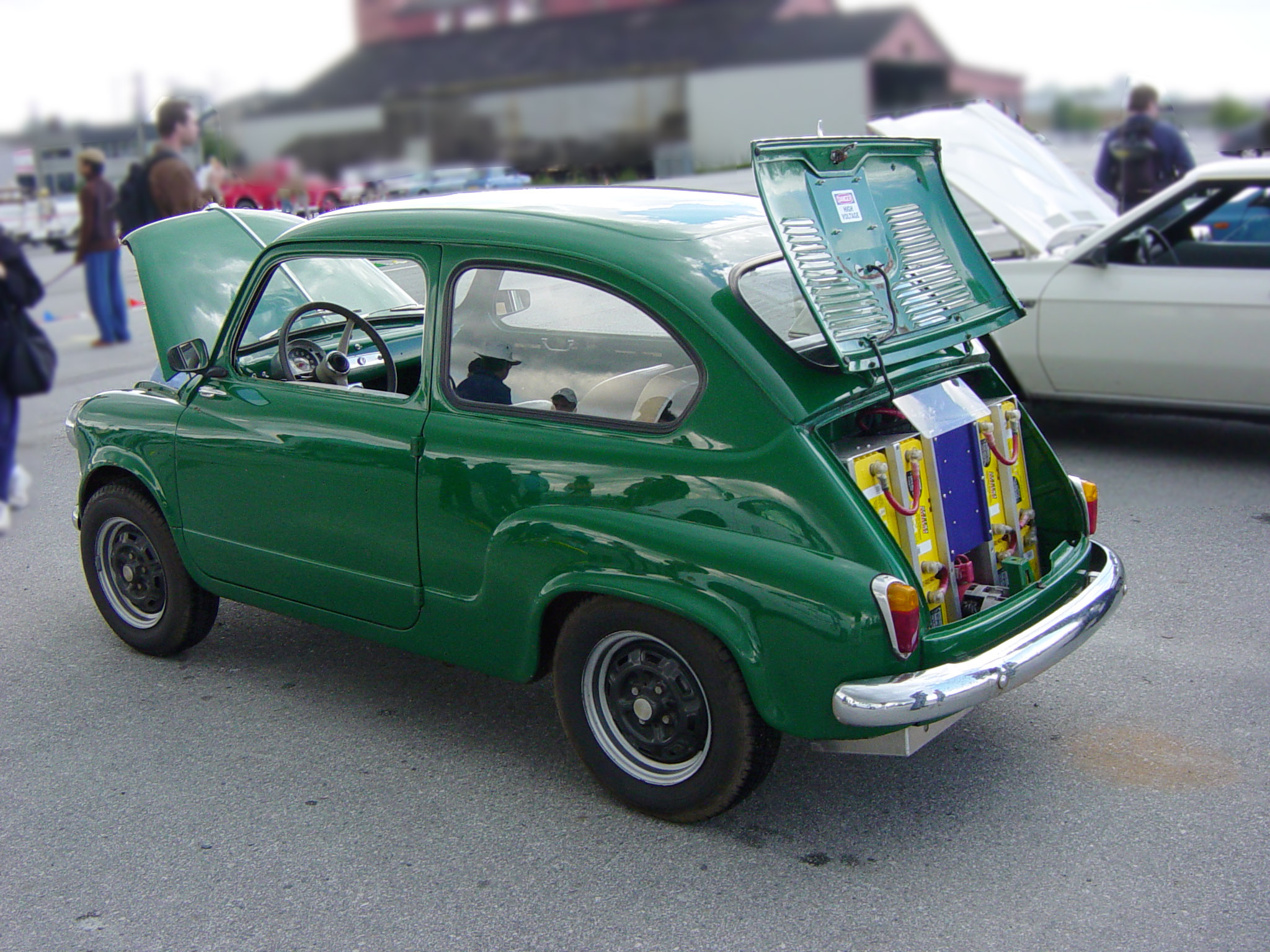
This Fiat 600 employs batteries that can be mounted in any position.

In automobile engineering, electric vehicle conversion is the replacement of a car's combustion engine and connected components with an electric motor and batteries, to create a battery electric vehicle (BEV).

An electromod is a vehicle that has been restored and modified by converting its drivetrain to operate as an electric vehicle (EV). The term is a portmanteau of electrification and restomod, itself a portmanteau of restoration and modification, a process which traditionally has been associated with classic cars. Most electromods are one-off custom vehicles performed by specialty repair shops and hobbyists, but starting in the late 2010s, automobile manufacturers have been building their own electromods, sometimes with the assistance of specialty shops, to publicize their shift to battery electric powertrains and to build interest in crate engine EV drivetrain products.

There are two main aims for converting an internal combustion engine vehicle (aka combustion vehicle) to run as a battery-electric vehicle. The first is to eliminate tailpipe emissions of vehicles that are already on the road, as electric vehicles do not produce any direct emissions.

The second is to reduce the vast amount of waste created when cars reach the end of their life cycle – as older cars or those written off after a road traffic accident are typically scrapped. This creates a considerable amount of metal, plastic and fabric waste, and uses a large amount of energy to recycle discarded parts into useful materials.

Price is another key catalyst for the growing electric car conversion market. The cost of electric car batteries and motors has fallen in recent years, and the cost of conversion is dependent in many factors, including range and batteries used for conversion. Not all conversion companies are equal.

== Elements of a conversion ==
Fuel use in vehicle designs
Vehicle type	Fuel used
Combustion-only vehicle (ICE)	Exclusively uses petroleum or other fuel.
Micro hybrid electric vehicle (μHEV)	Exclusively uses petroleum or other fuel, but can shut off engine to consume less.
Mild hybrid electric vehicle (MHEV, BAHV)	Exclusively uses petroleum or other fuel, but has electric battery to consume less.
Plug-in hybrid vehicle (PHEV)	Uses mixture of petroleum or other fuel and electricity from power grid.
All-electric vehicle (BEV, AEV)	Exclusively uses electricity from power grid.
Fuel cell vehicle (FCV, FCEV)	Exclusively uses hydrogen or other fuel to generate electricity.

Almost any vehicle can be converted to electric. Many people prefer to pick a vehicle that is light and aerodynamic in order to maximize distance traveled per battery charge. There must also be adequate room and load capacity for batteries.

The battery pack provides a source of electrical power. The most commonly available and affordable batteries are lead-acid flooded type, followed by AGM (absorption glass mat) sealed maintenance-free batteries, Ni-MH and Li-ion.

The charger which restores energy to the batteries (which may be mounted within the vehicle or at a special charging station at some fixed location). The power controller, which regulates the flow of energy between the battery and the electric motor(s), controlled by an electronic throttle. One or more electric motors and their mechanical attachment to the driveline. Power conductors connecting the battery, controller, and motor(s). Accessory equipment to power auxiliary equipment such as power brakes and heating system. Control circuitry and equipment to allow control and interlocking of the various components. Instrumentation specific to the operation and maintenance of the conversion.

An EV conversion typically involves 10 main components: the battery pack, the battery management system (BMS), the motor controller, the electric motor, the onboard charger, the DC-DC converter, the contactor and high-voltage junction box, the Hall-effect throttle, the thermal management system, and the wiring harness with high-voltage cabling.

== Electric car conversion industry ==
Electric car conversion has gone from being exclusively conducted by hobbyists and enthusiasts, to a rapidly growing industry. U.S. Electricar was one of the first commercial electric car conversion companies, founded in the 1970s to sell converted versions of conventional cars in the United States using lead-acid battery storage systems. Solectria was another notable early converter, offering the Force, which was equipped with lead-acid batteries alongside premium variants with longer range using nickel metal-hydride batteries.

Spurred on by the climate crisis, electric vehicle conversions address the shortfall in new EV availability and also offer a more affordable route for many, as new electric vehicles remain more expensive than their internal combustion engine counterparts. This has also seen the EV conversion industry diverge away from only converting classic and high-end cars.

As of early 2021, it is now possible to convert a petrol, diesel or hybrid vehicle to run as a battery electric car for around £6,000 ($8,300).

The industry has worked closely with regulators across a number of countries to establish safety protocols and to ensure that annual vehicle inspection tests on electric conversions are conducted in the same way that any other electric vehicle would be.

The biggest barrier to the widespread success of the EV conversion industry is the availability of batteries and motors, as vehicle manufacturers are not eager to sell their technology for this purpose. However, an open source community has grown alongside the electric vehicle conversion industry to enable batteries and motors from different manufacturers to work in unison in order to lower costs and overcome availability issues.

To meet the growing demand for trained mechanics who can carry out electric vehicle conversion, organizations such as New Electric Ireland have developed training programmes to educate mechanics and hobbyists in how to carry out conversions.

== Hobbyist conversions ==
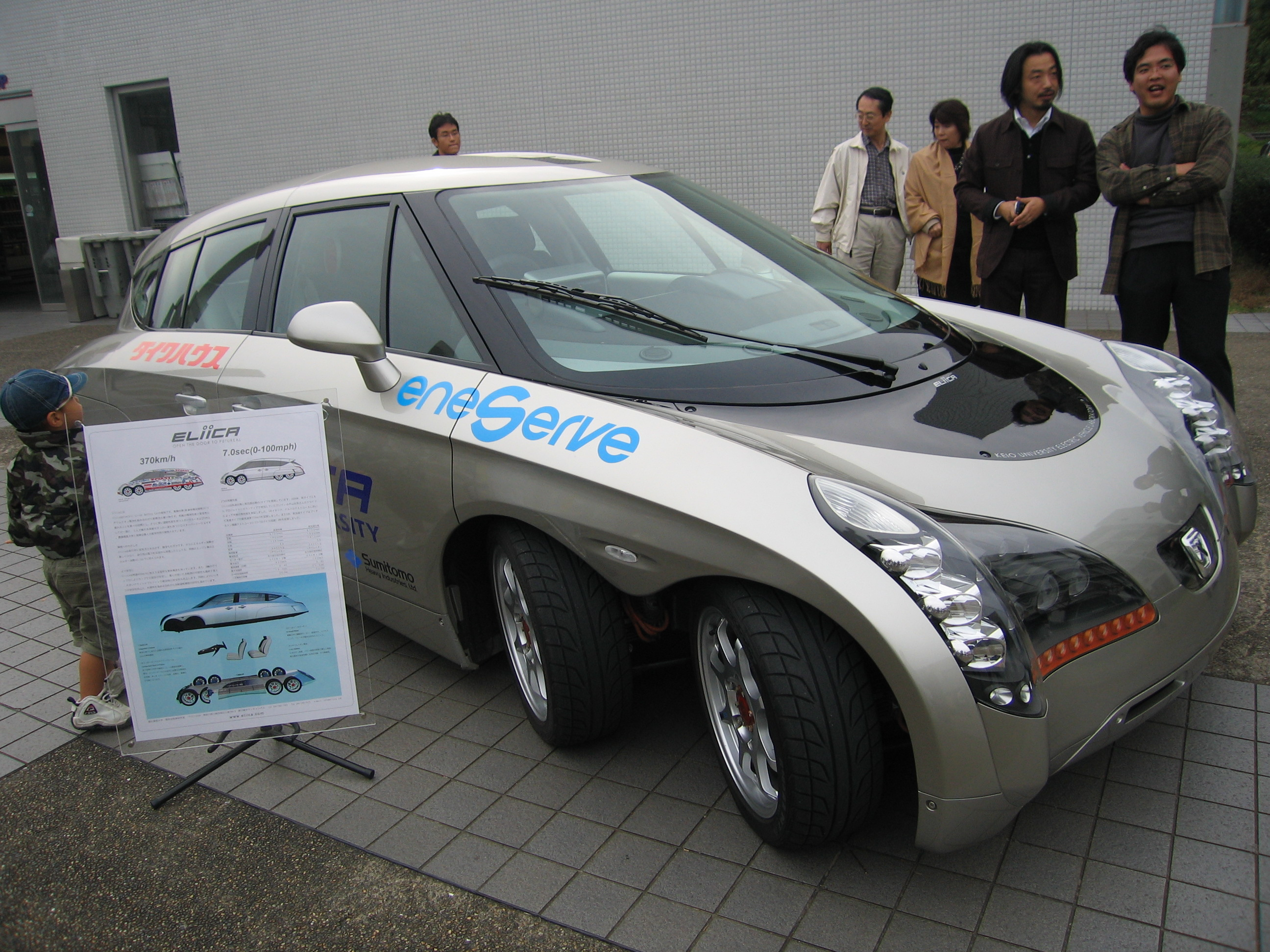
Eliica prototype

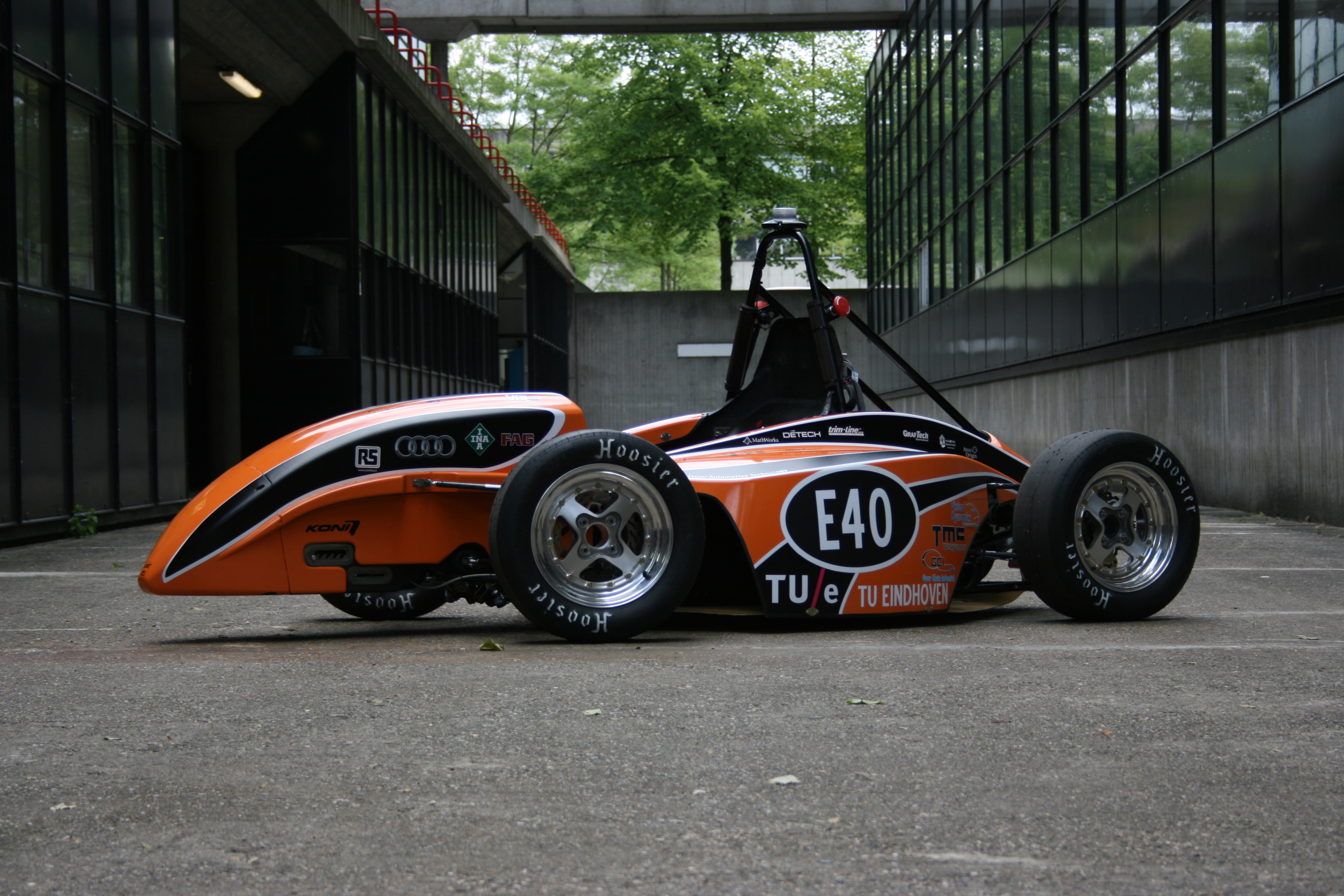
The full electric Formula Student car of the Eindhoven University of Technology

Hobbyists often build their own EVs by converting existing production cars to run solely on electricity. There is a cottage industry supporting the conversion and construction of BEVs by hobbyists. Universities such as the University of California, Irvine even build their own custom electric or hybrid-electric cars from scratch.

Short-range battery electric vehicles can offer the hobbyist comfort, utility, and quickness, sacrificing only range. Short-range EVs may be built using high-performance lead–acid batteries, using about half the mass needed for a 100–130 km (60–80 miles) range. The result is a vehicle with about a 50 km (30 miles) range, which, when designed with appropriate weight distribution (40/60 front to rear), does not require power steering, offers exceptional acceleration in the lower end of its operating range, and is freeway capable and legal. But their EVs are expensive due to the higher cost for these higher-performance batteries. By including a manual transmission, short-range EVs can obtain both better performance and greater efficiency than the single-speed EVs developed by major manufacturers. Unlike the converted golf carts used for neighborhood electric vehicles, short-range EVs may be operated on typical suburban throughways (where 60–80 km/h, 35–50 mph speed limits are typical) and can keep up with traffic typical on such roads and the short "slow-lane" on-and-off segments of freeways common in suburban areas.

Faced with chronic fuel shortage on the Gaza Strip, Palestinian electrical engineer Waseem Othman al-Khozendar invented in 2008 a way to convert his car to run on 32 electric batteries. According to al-Khozendar, the batteries can be charged with US$2 worth of electricity to drive from 180–240 km (110–150 mi). After a seven-hour charge, the car should also be able to run up to a speed of 100 km/h (60 mph).

In 2008, several Chinese manufacturers began marketing lithium iron phosphate (LiFePO_{4}) batteries directly to hobbyists and vehicle conversion shops. These batteries offered much better power-to-weight ratios allowing vehicle conversions to typically achieve 120–240 km (75–150 mi) per charge. Prices gradually declined to approximately US$350 per kW·h by mid-2009. As the LiFePO_{4} cells feature life ratings of 3,000 cycles, compared to typical lead acid battery ratings of 300 cycles, the life expectancy of LiFePO_{4} cells is around 10 years. LiFePO_{4} cells require more expensive battery management and charging systems than lead acid batteries.

=== History ===
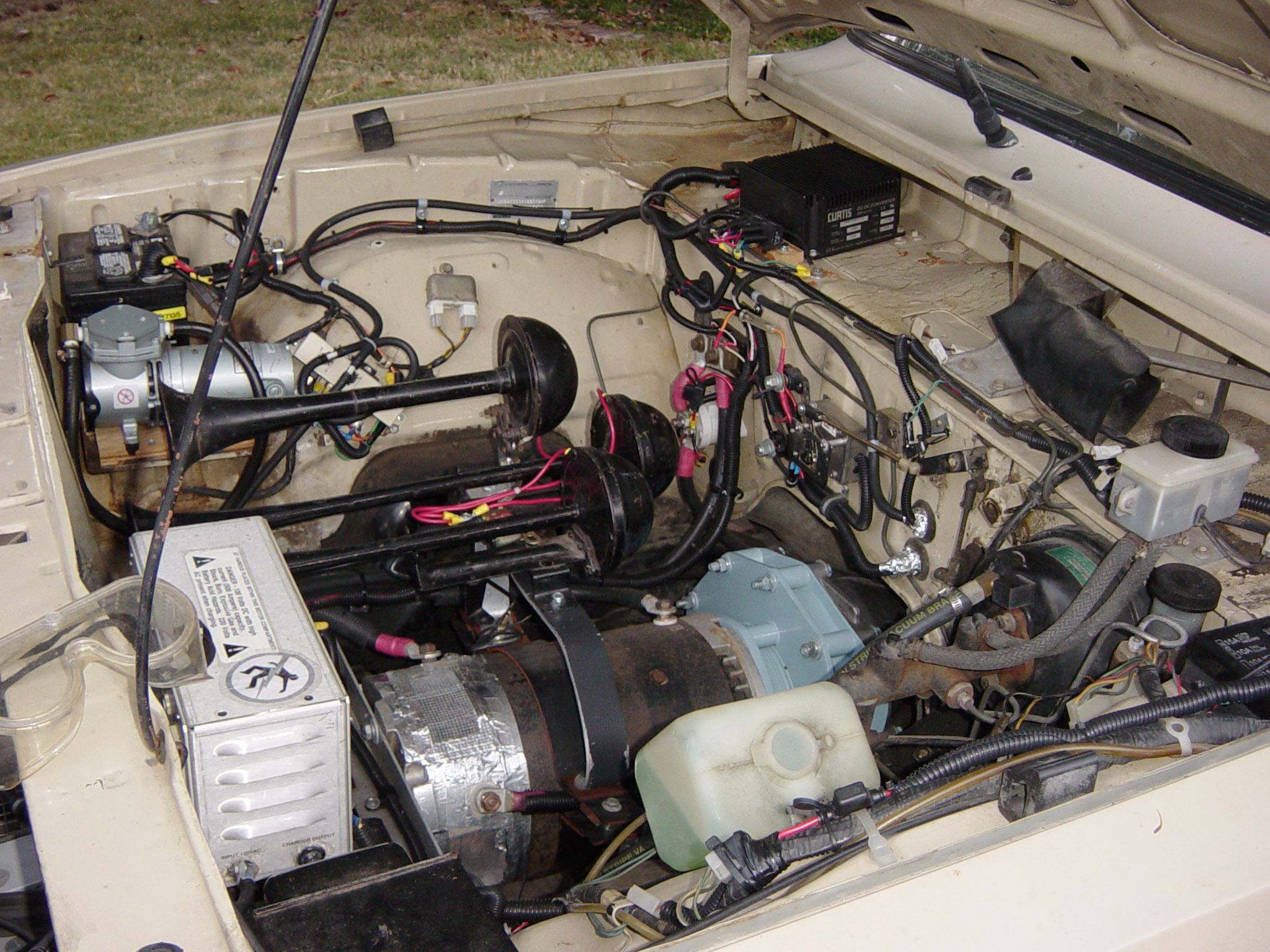
Engine compartment of a converted EV, showing the adapter plate used to couple the traction motor to the existing transmission.

Hobbyists have been converting cars originally powered by internal combustion engines to EVs since at least the 1960s. Historically, these used existing technology such as surplus aircraft starter motors and lead-acid batteries; these efforts were driven by ecological and financial reasons to increase efficiency and avoid using fossil fuels, with renewed interest piqued by the oil crises in 1973 and again in 1979. However, the converted EV powertrain range and power usually suffered compared to the original vehicle. Multiple books were written to document and guide these conversions in the late 1970s and 1980s, including The Complete Book of Electric Vehicles (Shacket, 1979), How to Convert to an Electric Car (Lucas & Riess, 1980), Convert It (Brown & Prange, 1993), and Build Your Own Electric Vehicle (Brant, 1994).

The increasing popularity of hybrid and battery electric vehicles since the 1990s and the turn of the 21st century along with tightening emissions mandates have spurred the development of more powerful electric traction motors and improved battery chemistries giving increased energy storage density, resulting in electric vehicles with still-limited range but with power comparable to conventional automobiles and trucks. In 2012, Rimac Automobili showed off its 1984 BMW E30 that had been restored and repowered with an electric drivetrain by breaking EV acceleration records. With electrified drivetrains now becoming more readily available through recycling crashed EVs, a market has developed for electromod conversions of classic and replica cars. Although some owners have commissioned electromod conversions of sports cars, several automotive journalists have argued the quiet, smooth characteristics of an EV drivetrain are better suited to luxury cars.

Many non-factory electromods are implemented by extracting and adapting the drivetrain or individual components (traction motor(s), battery, controller, and inverter) from an existing mass-produced EV, such as Tesla. In October 2019 there were no purpose-built crate engine EV kits available commercially, but such projects were in development by companies such as Swindon Powertrain. For example, EV West announced their Revolt Tesla Crate Motor in 2020, which married an electric traction motor from a Tesla with a gear reduction unit and ended in a universal joint yoke, a suitable interface for a driveshaft. Mechanically, the motor is fitted with mounts compatible with Chevrolet small-block engines to take advantage of numerous small-block repower kits.

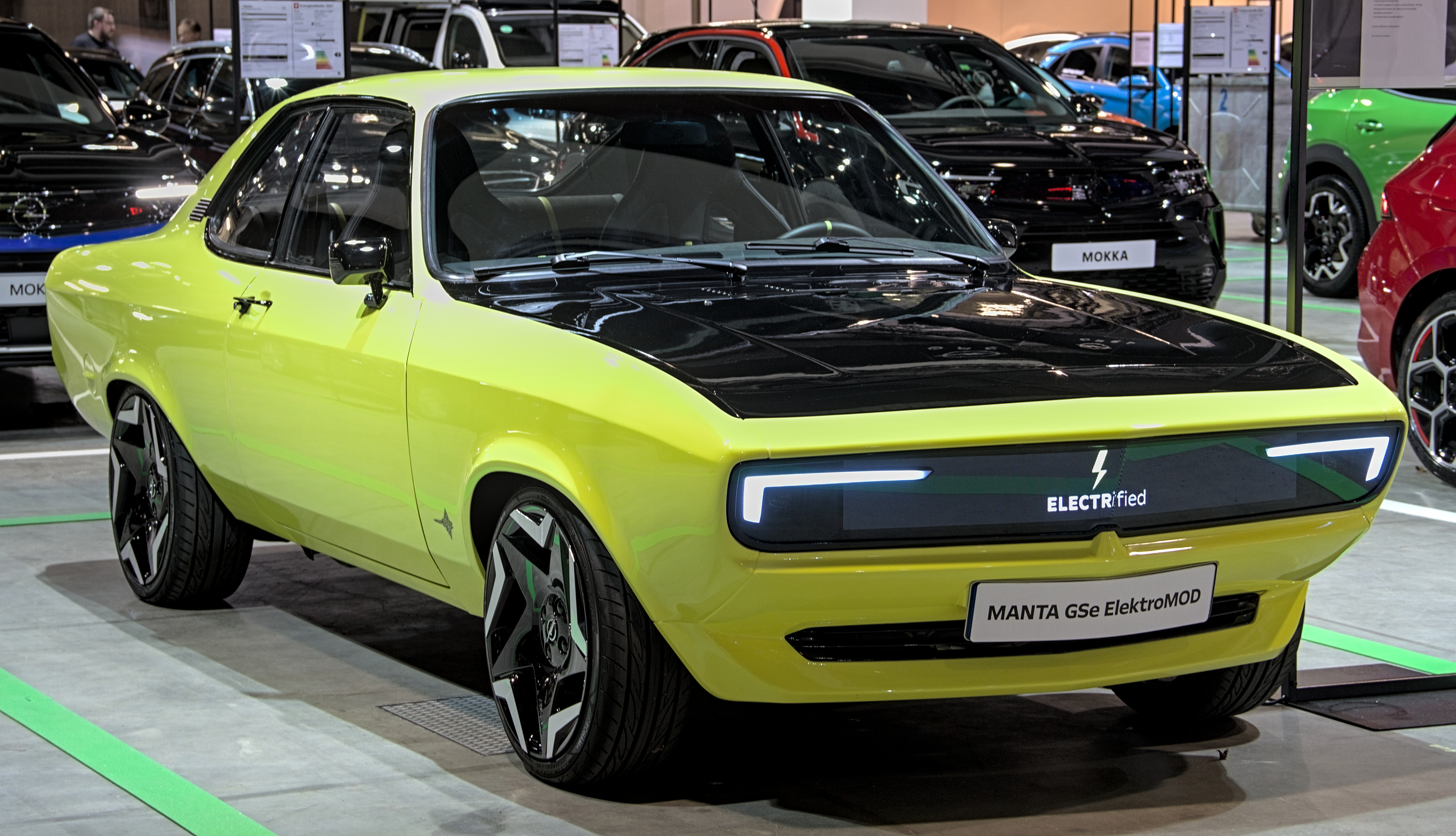
Opel Manta GSe ElektroMOD at Auto Zürich 2021

The term electromod was coined around 2020 and serves a generic trademark for the restomod and electrification process. In 2021, the Opel Manta GSe ElektroMOD was unveiled by Opel as an electrified restomod of the Manta A; Opel stated the name was meant both to recall the Opel Elektro GT sports EV of 1971 and to describe the modern drivetrain and restomod of the original Manta. The resulting electromod attracted significant press attention and was used to publicize the electrification of Opel's lineup.

=== Examples ===
==== Early conversions ====
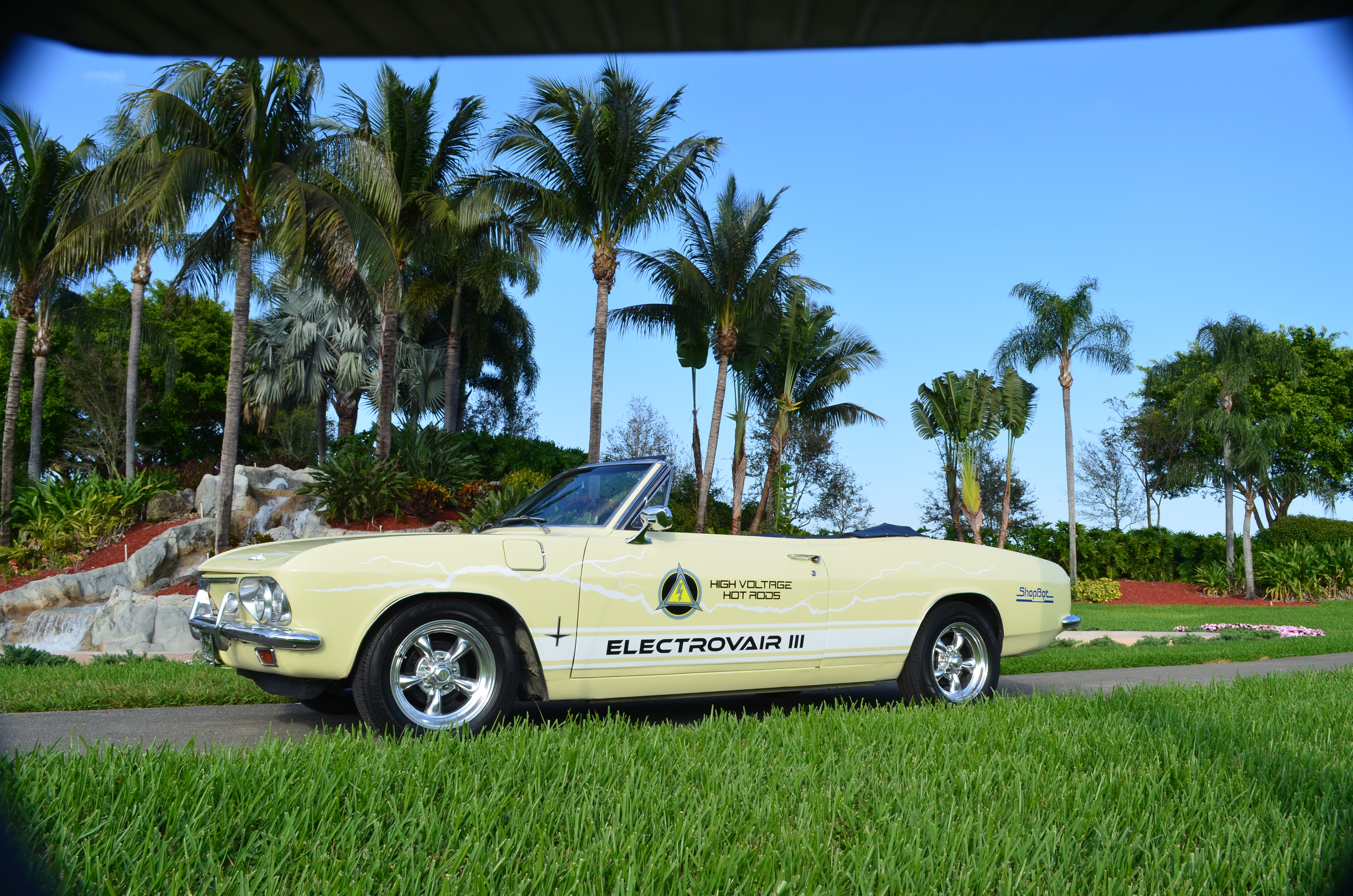
The ElectroVair III was built in 2011 by High Voltage Hot Rods as an homage to the ElectroVair II

In the mid-1960s, General Motors demonstrated vehicles that had been repowered with AC induction traction motors, including the ElectroVair I and II, using 1964 and 1966 Chevrolet Corvair chassis, respectively, and the ElectroVan, built on a 1966 GMC HandiVan. The ElectroVair used a 680 lb (310 kg) traction battery with silver-zinc chemistry, providing a range of 80 mi (130 km) but with a low number of charging cycles and at a high cost (estimated at US$15,000 (equivalent to $145,000 in 2025) in 1967). The ElectroVan used a hydrogen fuel cell to supply its motor and had an estimated range of 125 mi (201 km).

In August 1968, students from Caltech and MIT held "The Great Electric Car Race", with an EV-converted 1968 Chevrolet Corvair departing Cambridge for Pasadena while the CalTech "Voltswagen" (a converted 1958 Microbus) raced for Cambridge; the winner was the Voltswagen, which finished the trip in 210 hours and 3 minutes. Although the Voltswagen finished after the MIT Corvair, it was declared the winner when penalties were assessed to the MIT team for towing the Corvair to the finish after accidentally destroying its traction motor. The Caltech Voltswagen, campaigned by its owner Wally Rippel, used batteries costing approximately US$600 (equivalent to $6,000 in 2025), while the MIT Corvair was supplied by General Motors and was carrying US$20,000 (equivalent to $185,000 in 2025) worth of nickel-cadmium batteries from Gulton Industries. Battery heat management during charging stops was an issue for both teams, which resorted to cooling the batteries with ice at each stop.

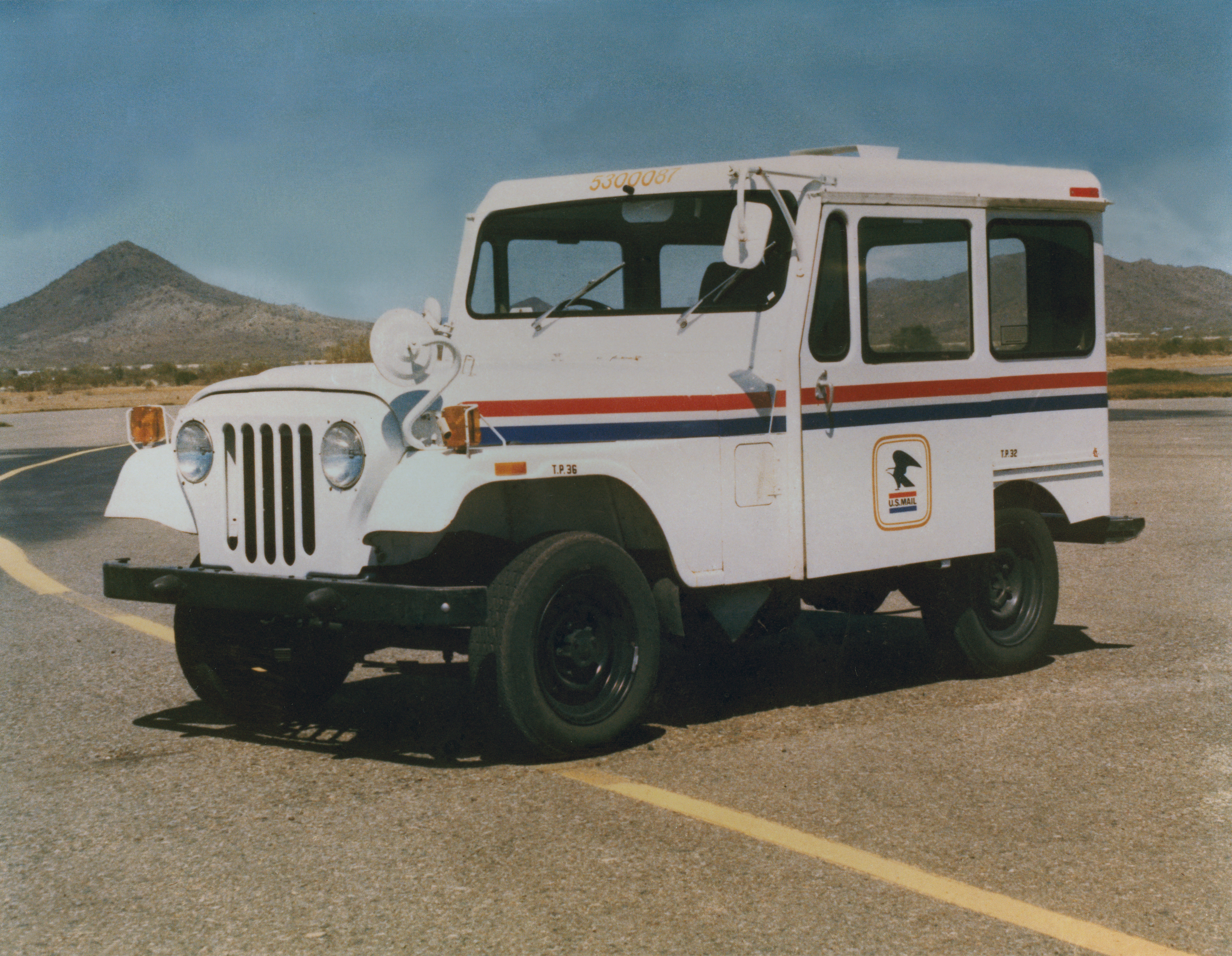
DJ-5E Electruck

AM General converted 350 DJ-5E Electrucks for the United States Postal Service; these delivery vehicles used an EV powertrain to eliminate a mobile source of pollution. 300 were placed into operation in southern California starting in 1975. The DJ-5E had a 30 hp (22 kW) DC motor that gave a top speed of 40 mph (64 km/h) and a range of 29 mi (47 km) using a 17.8 kW-hr lead-acid battery.

GM continued to develop prototype EVs based on conventional cars, including the 1979 Electrovette, a converted Chevette with twenty 12-volt batteries weighing a total of 920 lb (420 kg) providing a range of 30 mi (48 km). The batteries used a zinc-nickel oxide chemistry to increase energy density. At the time, GM President Pete Estes said the new chemistry "will make electric vehicles viable alternatives to gasoline or diesel cars and trucks". The batteries had an estimated life of 300 recharge cycles, with an estimated replacement cost ranging from US$800 to $2000.

U.S. Electricar sold the Lectric Leopard in the late 1970s for US$7,995 (equivalent to $35,500 in 2025); it was a Renault Le Car converted with a DC traction motor and a large traction battery carried in the cargo area. The Prestolite DC motor developed 12 hp (8.9 kW) and the battery consisted of sixteen six-volt cells, connected and switched to provide 24 or 48 volts when discharging to the motor, or 48 volts when charging. Total capacity was 138 A-hr. Estimated driving range was 58 km (36 mi). U.S. Electricar was founded as Solar Electric Engineering, Inc. in 1976.

==== Non-manufacturer ====
Students under the guidance of Pat McCue, the automotive teacher at Bothell High School in a suburb of Seattle, converted a BMW into an electric vehicle in 2011, drawing the attention of foundry10, which gave the program a grant that was used to develop Shock and Awe, an electric drag racing car that set a world record in 2016 by running 8.328 seconds in the 1/4 mi (0.40 km), with a trap speed of 166.29 mph (267.62 km/h). It is built on a Jerry Bickel Pro Stock chassis with the body of a 2003 Pontiac Firebird and is powered by two AMRacing A/C electric traction motors producing approximately 900 hp (670 kW) and 600 lb⋅ft (810 N⋅m) of torque.

East Coast Defender and Electric Classic Cars demonstrated a Tesla EV-sourced powertrain conversion of a 1969–96 Range Rover Classic to Motor Trend in 2021.

==== Manufacturer ====
In 2018, Chevrolet Performance advanced an "electric crate motor" concept with the unveiling of the eCOPO Camaro at that year's SEMA show. The eCOPO Camaro was a 2019 COPO Camaro which was equipped with a pair of BorgWarner HVH250-150 motor assemblies instead of the conventional piston engine. The electric traction motor essentially served as a drop-in replacement with the same bellhousing bolt pattern and crankshaft flange as the LS engine family, so the car retained the same transmission, driveshaft, and axles as the conventional COPO Camaro. It was developed in partnership with Hancock and Lane Racing and Pat McCue.

At the 2019 SEMA show, Chevrolet continued to develop the EV crate motor idea, following up with the E-10 Concept, which used the powertrains from two Bolt EVs repackaged into in a restored 1962 C-10 pickup truck.

For SEMA 2020, Chevrolet showcased the "Electric Connect and Cruise" eCrate package, which included the main drivetrain components of a single Bolt EV (motor, battery, controller, and inverter), and was demonstrated as a retrofit to a restored 1977 K5 Blazer. The kit was scheduled to go on sale in the second half of 2021. In this application, the Bolt motor was modified by removing the differential and reduction gear unit, then fitting an adapter plate and crank flange, allowing it to bolt to a conventional transmission. Together with the controller and inverter, the motor occupies approximately the same space as the small-block V8 it replaced; the 900 lb (410 kg) battery was bolted into the cargo area. In general, the battery presents a greater challenge for packaging, which is why the initial development has focused on trucks. As of July 2022, the eCrate package was still being explored as a "future business opportunity", according to Chevrolet Vice President Scott Bell. Chevrolet plans to release the Ultium eCrate Package in mid-2023.

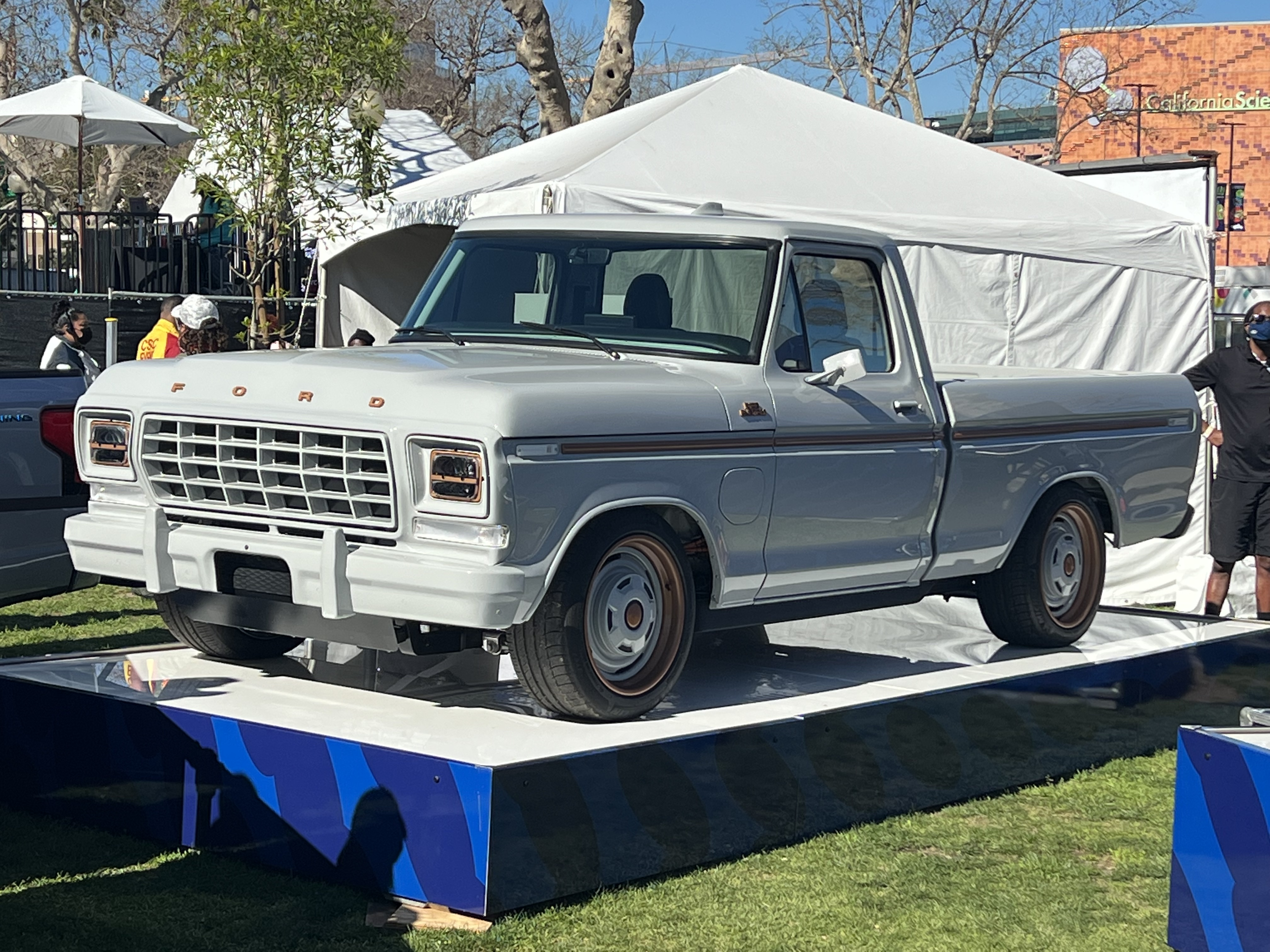
1978 F-100 Eluminator "electromod" truck, displayed at the Los Angeles Memorial Coliseum (Feb 2022)

In November 2021, Ford Performance released the "Eluminator" 210 kW (281 hp) crate EV motor, which was the same traction motor used in the Ford Mustang Mach-E GT Performance Edition and used to power the 1978 F-100 Eluminator restomod pickup truck. As of 3 November 2021, the crate motor was available for pre-order but not yet shipping. Final assembly and integration of the F-100 Eluminator was performed by McCue-Lane electric Race Cars (MLe), a shop operated as a partnership between Pat McCue and racer Jeff Lane.

Hyundai Motor Corporation won praise from the press for its Heritage Series electromods presented in 2021, which include a Pony and Grandeur, both restored and repowered as EVs and carrying that brand's "Parametric Pixel" design language applied to its Ioniq sub-brand. Powertrain details were not supplied. Additional factory electromods shown recently include conversions of a Maserati Shamal (November 2020), the Manta A previously mentioned (May 2021), and Renault 5 Diamant and Turbo 3E one-offs (2022).

At the 2023 Tokyo Auto Salon, Toyota demonstrated two AE86-based electromod concepts: the BEV Concept, which is a Corolla Levin equipped with the electric motor from the Tundra i-Force Max hybrid coupled to the original manual transmission, drawing from a storage battery taken from the plug-in version of the Prius hybrid; and the H2 Concept, which is a Sprinter Trueno that retains its internal combustion 4A-GE engine, modified to run on hydrogen fuel instead of gasoline.

== Solar power ==
On-board solar cells can be used to power an electric vehicle. The small power generated by solar cells mounted on a vehicle means that the other components in the system must be special to compensate for this.

== Conversion process ==
The conversion process starts with the selection of a donor car, which can be powered by fuel (petrol, diesel or hybrid). The engine, fuel tank and gearbox are then removed and replaced with an electric motor, batteries and an inverter.

If the donor vehicle is a hybrid, the driveshaft can be retained also, as it has already been designed to work with electric car batteries and power delivery systems. It is common for the batteries used in electric car conversions to be recycled from new electric vehicles which have been involved in a traffic accident. In Europe, the curb weight of the donor car will need to be retained once it is converted.

Once the car has been converted, it will need to be assessed by a vehicle safety engineer before it can be used on the road.

In some countries, the user can choose to buy a converted vehicle of any model in the automaker dealerships only paying the cost of the batteries and motor, with no installation costs (it is called pre-conversion or previous conversion).

== Industry ==
The electric vehicle conversion industry has grown to include conversion car garages, aftermarket kits and vehicle components. Some companies focus specifically on certain classic cars (i.e. VW Beetle, Rolls-Royce, Jaguar, Citroën H Van, etc.)

The work of these companies has been highlighted by publications including Autocar Fully Charged, and Auto Express as prices have fallen and demand has increased for affordable conversions alongside high-end options.

== Vehicle types ==
=== Electric bicycle ===
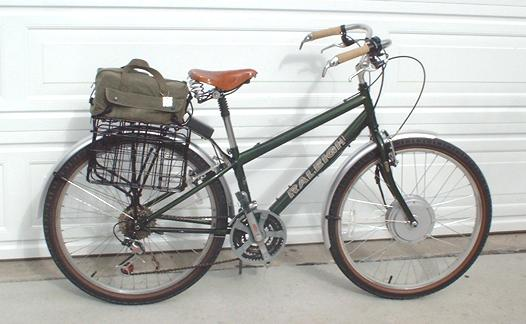
A bicycle with an aftermarket hub-motor in the front wheel

An electric bicycle is a conventional bicycle that has been fitted with an electric motor. Most often electric bicycles or e-bikes are powered by rechargeable batteries however some experimental electric bicycles run directly on or recharge their batteries via solar panels, fuel cells, gas generators or other alternative energy sources. Using an on-board generator may impact the legal jurisdictional definition of an electric bicycle. A few types of electric bicycles are able to re-capture a small amount of energy from braking and can re-charge the batteries while braking or traveling down hills (regenerative braking).

Some electric bikes have features where the motor can move the bicycle by itself (immediate start) if the rider chooses not to pedal with a button or throttle controller, while others require the rider to pedal at all times (pedal assist). This latter type may in some jurisdictions allow the vehicle to be used on bicycle trails that otherwise prohibit motorized vehicles of any kind (see motorized bicycle).

Many battery technologies are available for powering electric bikes. The most common and least expensive battery technology is sealed lead acid but LiFePO_{4} is fast becoming the battery of choice for the e-bike.

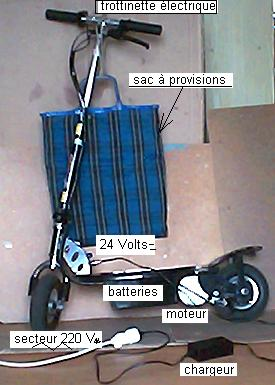
Electric scooter

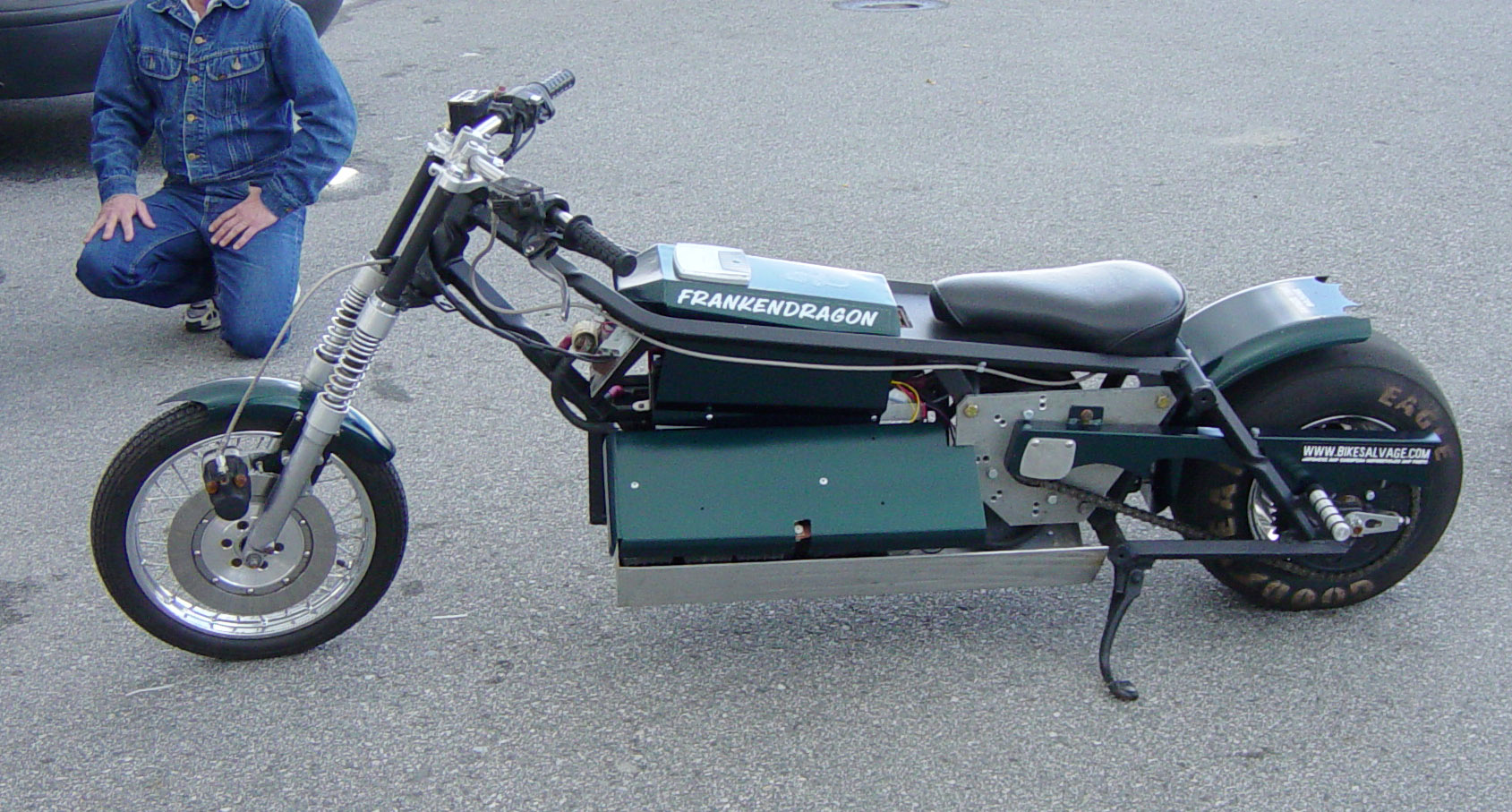
Custom drag bike

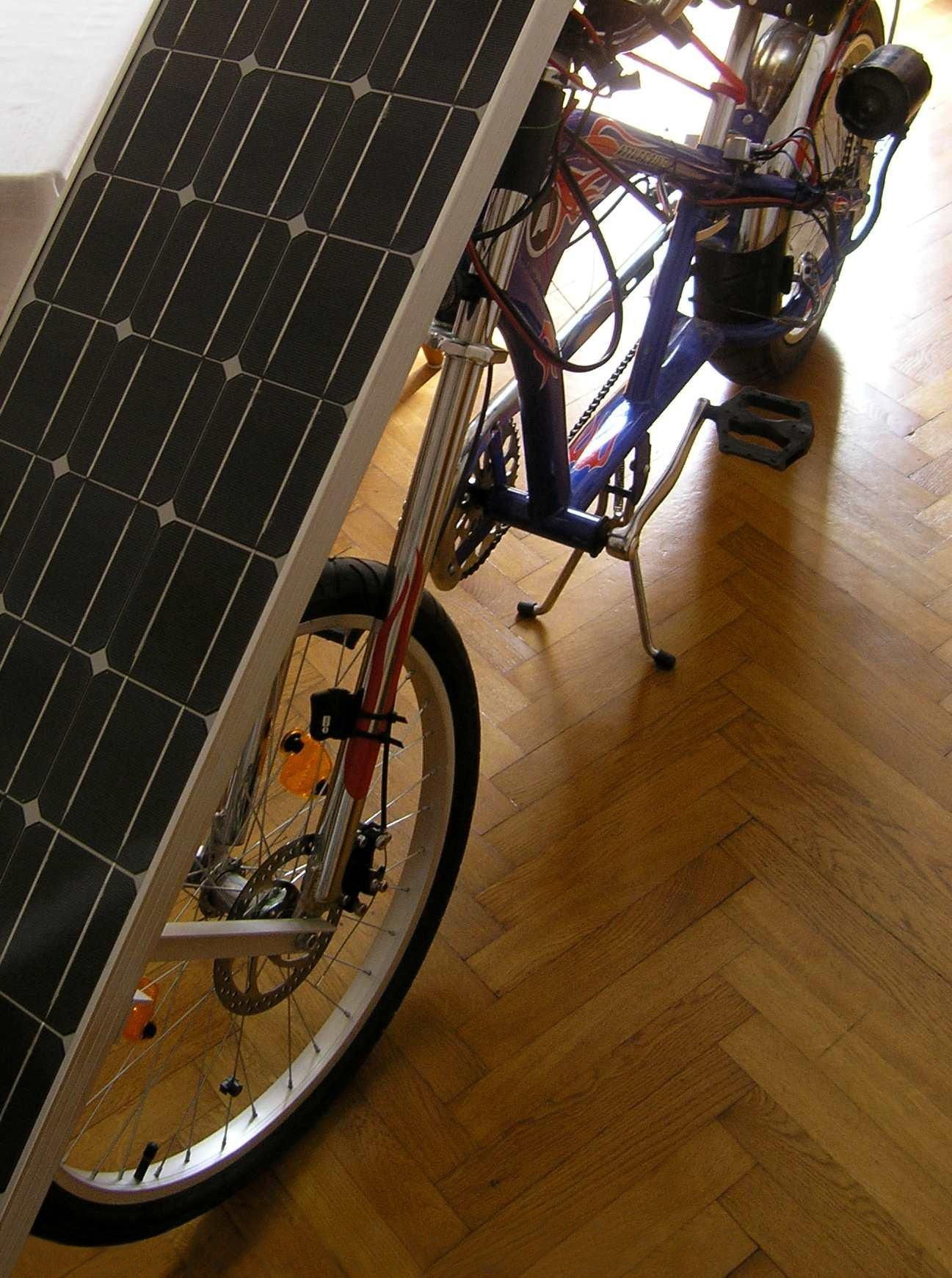
Solar cruiser

== Registration of converted and newly constructed vehicles ==
=== United States ===
The ease of registration will vary by state. Some states require safety inspections, usually to ensure body integrity in areas subject to severe corrosion from winter road de-icing materials. In any case, for general registration all functional safety equipment should be operating – turn signals, brake lights, headlights, horn, etc. The windshield should have no running cracks (small stone chips and "stars" may be acceptable if not in the driver's principal line of vision). If the vehicle has been reconstructed from a salvage vehicle (a vehicle whose registration has been forfeited) inspection may be more severe to ensure compliance and the legitimacy of sources of salvage components by presentation of proper purchase receipts.

Registration procedures will vary by state and will usually be more difficult in states with strict emissions requirements.

On the other hand, changing the registration allows a conversion to qualify for tax incentives available in some states, such as Oregon, for either the vehicle, the charging system, or both.

==== California (US) conversion registration and taxation ====
The State of California makes provisions to inspect electric vehicle conversions. Electric vehicles are exempted from emissions control inspections. A vehicle may either a substantially new build, or a conversion of an existing vehicle.

=== Spain ===
In Spain, the conversion (called transformation) is regulated by Real Decreto 866/2010, de 2 de julio, por el que se regula la tramitación de las reformas de vehículos.

== See also ==
- Automobile engine replacement § EV crate engines
- Automotive aftermarket, automotive industry concerned with secondary parts
- CalCars, former non-profit organization (2002-2010)
- Conversion to sleeper car, a car with unassuming exterior that has high performance
- Electric car, automobile propelled by an electric motor
- Electromod
- Engine swap, replacing a car's engine
- Green tuning, tuning of cars to reduce energy consumption
- Kit car, automobile that the buyer assembles into a functioning car
- Maker culture, community interested in technical pursuits
- Plug-in hybrid (PHEV), vehicle with both internal combustion engine and an electric engine whose battery can be recharged externally
- Vehicle glider, vehicle without a powertrain
