= Hybrids Plus =

American company

- Type: Privately held company
- Industry: Automotive industry
- Founded: 2006
- Founder: Carl Lawrence, Davide Andrea
- Defunct: 2009
- Headquarters: Boulder, Colorado, United States
- Products: PHEV conversions
- Number of employees: 20

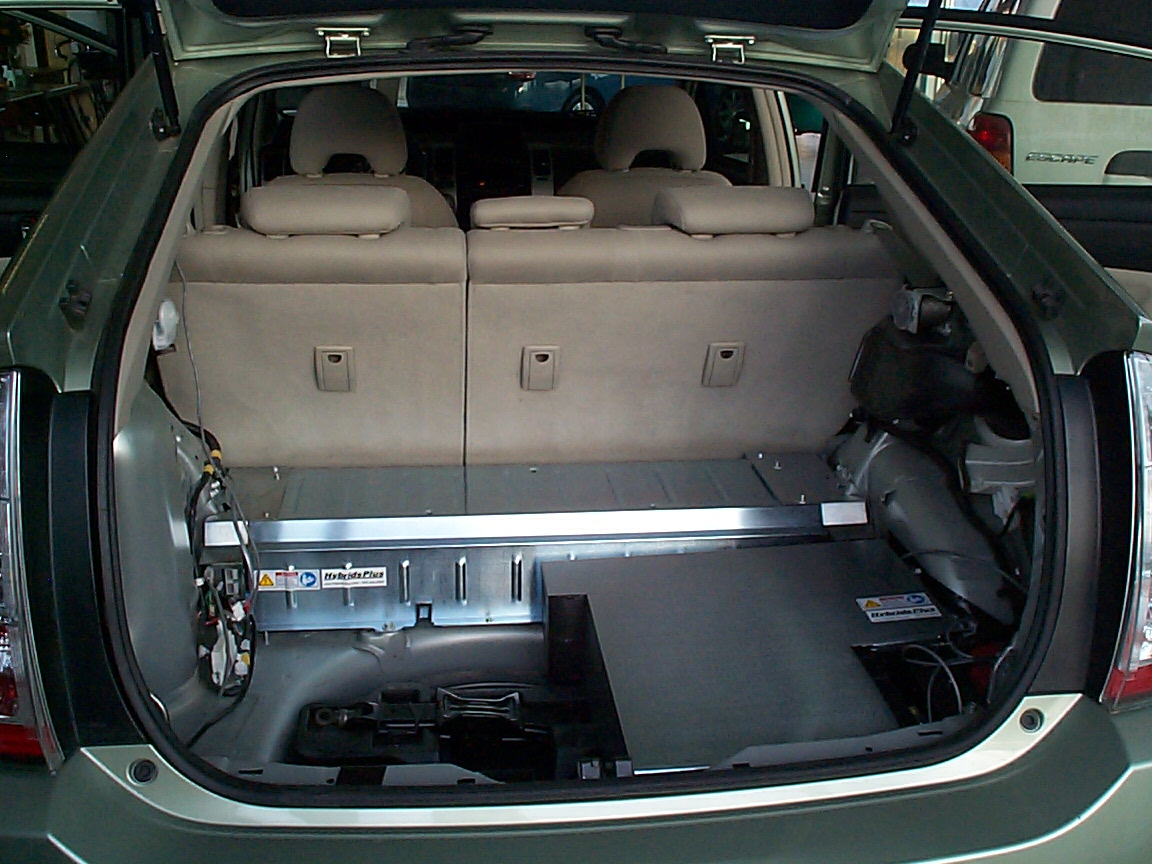
Hybrids Plus plug-in hybrid Toyota Prius conversion with PHEV-30 (30 mile or 48 km all-electric range) battery packs

Hybrids Plus was a company operating from 2006 to 2009 that was devoted to converting hybrid electric vehicles (HEVs) to plug-in hybrids (PHEVs), including vehicle-to-grid capable PHEVs.

== History ==
The company was founded July, 2006 in Boulder, Colorado to convert a Toyota Prius for the State of Colorado. In 2007 Hybrids Plus won a contract with the New York State Energy Research and Development Authority, to convert a Ford Escape, and a contract with Xcel Energy to convert 6 Escapes to V2G capable PHEVs.

In 2007 Hybrids Plus started the development of the "Inverger," a bidirectional charger and inverter for vehicle-to-grid applications, funded in part by a grant from the State of Colorado, Governor's Energy Office.

In the summer of 2008, a malfunction due to a manufacturing error in one of its Prius PHEVs conversions resulted in a fire that destroyed the vehicle. As a consequence, the company started a program to examine and upgrade each of the PHEV conversions it had manufactured. After this, only one more Prius PHEV conversion was completed and then that product line was discontinued.

Towards the end of its existence, it converted Ford Escape HEVs to PHEVs by replacing the stock battery with a PHEV battery in the original location (as opposed to augmenting the stock battery with an additional battery, as normally done by other PHEV conversions), and adding a charger and a plug.

In fall 2008, A123 Systems contracted Hybrids Plus to recall all of the vehicles it converted, and remove A123's Li-Ion cells.

In April 2009, Hybrids Plus ceased operations. Its assets were absorbed by Eetrex, a company whose owners include some of the former shareholders of Hybrids Plus.
