= AC Propulsion tZero =

t_{zero}
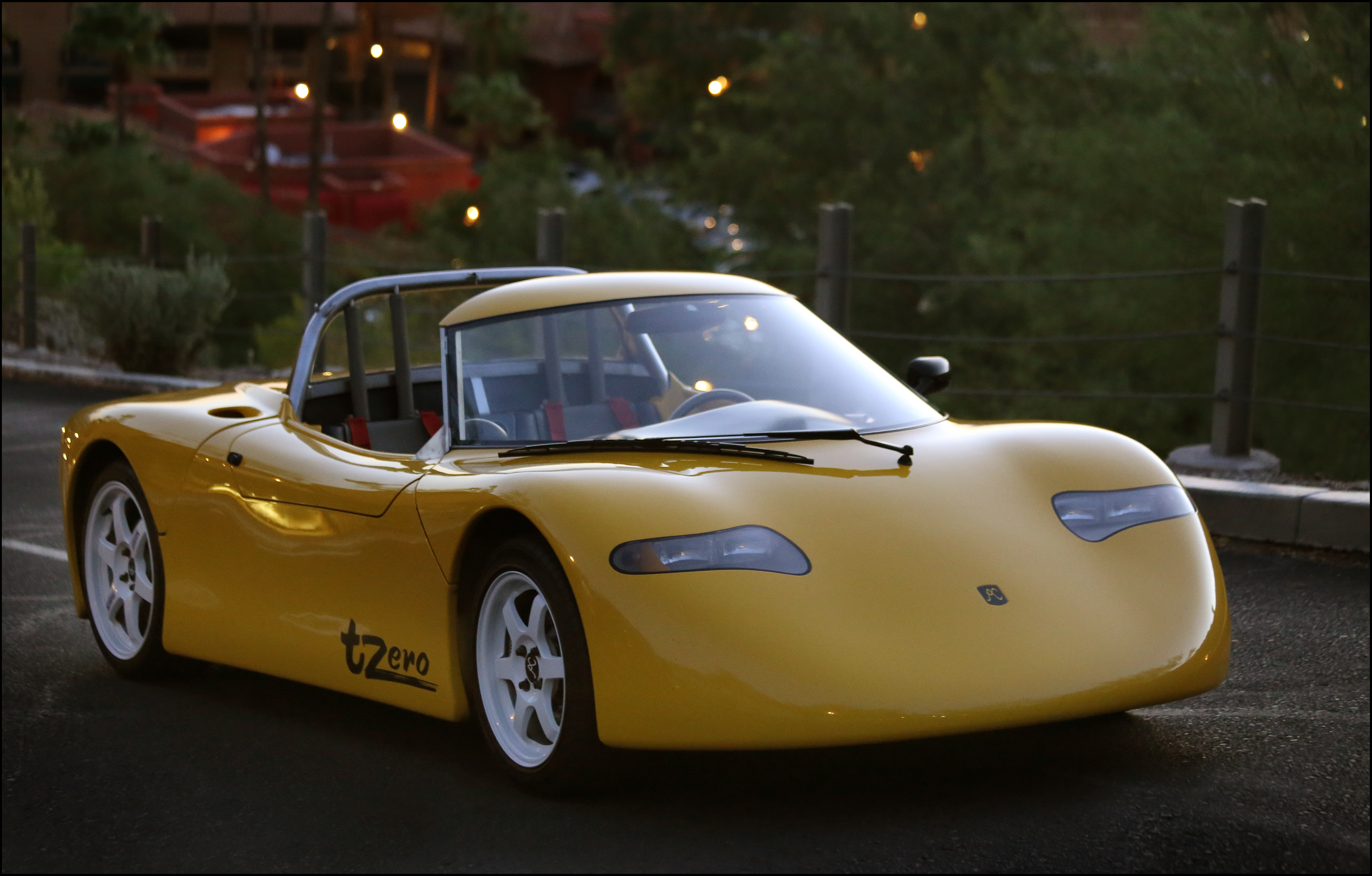
- The AC Propulsion tZero with the top off

Overview
- Manufacturer: AC Propulsion

Body and chassis
- Class: Sports car
- Body style: 2 passenger coupe
- Layout: Rear mid-engine, rear-wheel drive
- Platform: AC Propulsion AC150
- Related: Lotus Elise; Tesla Roadster (2008); Piontek Sportech

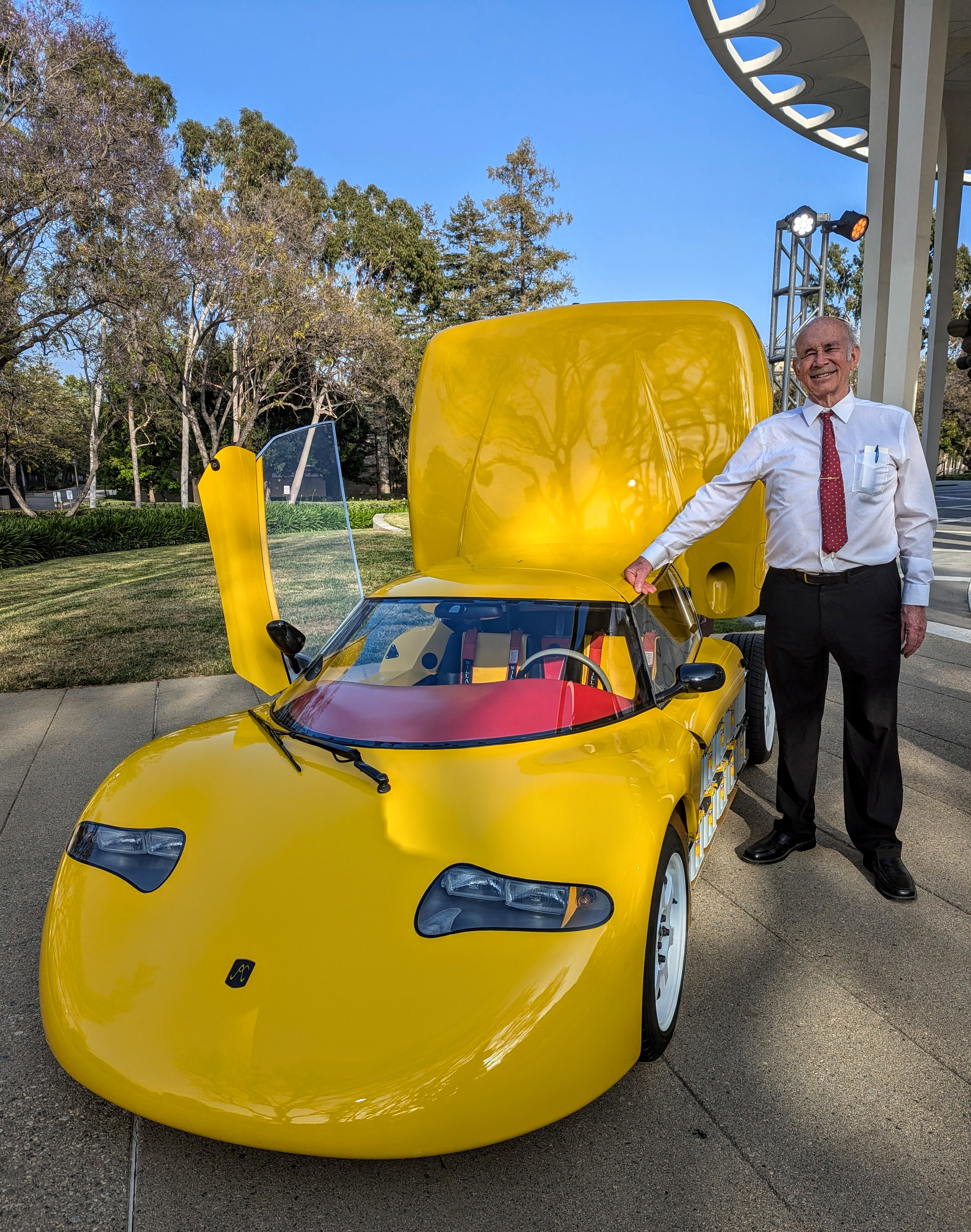
Wally Rippel showing his tZero prototype at Caltech in 2024

The tZero (a mathematical symbol meaning, 'time from a standing start in sequence') is a hand-built electric sports car designed and built in very limited numbers by the U.S. pioneering company AC Propulsion in the mid 1990s. It was the inspiration and direct predecessor of the Tesla line of electric cars. The only part of the tZero that was not proprietary was the body that was based on the Piontek Sportech sports car, yet many parts of the body and interior were extensively modified. It consists of a Kevlar & Carbon Fiber reinforced body built over a custom hand-built reinforced stainless steel fabricated to package batteries space frame with double wishbone independent suspension and rack and pinion steering. AC Propulsion utilized their AC-150 drivetrain, a single-speed electric system with an overall gear ratio of 9:1.

An experimental mule was made in the early 90s, and a complete vehicle was made the following year, launching in January 1996. Only 3 prototypes were built, the last one also being an official VIN production car. Prospect interested buyers included many big celebrities, well known scientists, and Silicon Valley engineers. Plans for a viable commercial production were eventually dropped in mid-2003. The name comes from t_{0}, the mathematical symbol for a starting point in time. Due to high production costs, AC Propulsion ceased to produce the tZero. Only three were built, and as of 2025, only 2 survive. The only remaining examples are owned by the company itself and a private owner. The last tZero vehicle built used an advanced/updated ACP Gen 2 system that was capable of V2G (vehicle-to-grid & vehicle-to-vehicle charging system). The tZero vehicles were extensively tested. Even including a cross country USA trip.

== Original lead–acid battery powered tZero ==
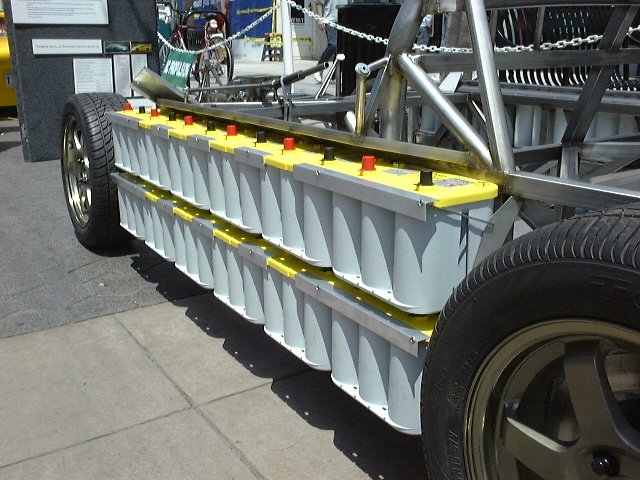
Original lead–acid battery pack

The original version of the tZero roadster ran on 28 Johnson Controls Optima Yellow Top spiral wound AGM deep cycle lead–acid batteries in series, which produced 150 & 165 kW (220 horsepower) and 177 lbs·ft (240 N·m) of torque at 336 volts and accelerated the 1,040 kg (2,290 lb) car from a standstill to 60 mph (97 km/h) in 4.07 seconds. The single gear ratio limited the car's maximum speed to 90 mph (140 km/h) at 12,000 rpm, although it is said that early prototypes fitted with multiple gear ratios could hit 170 miles per hour (270 km/h). Even with the single ratio, lead–acid models are capable of completing a quarter mile (400 m) drag race in 13.24 seconds. The expected range per charge of the tZero with the lead–acid batteries is 90 to 120 mi (140 to 190 km) as a result of consuming only 180 watt hours (DC) per mile (112 Wh/km) on the highway and due to regenerative braking. The car could be charged from 0 to 95% within an hour. The initial base price of this version was to have been US$90,000. but later exceeded $150,000. Because the car recharges its batteries when the throttle is released – slowing sharply as energy is recaptured – It can be driven hard using only the accelerator pedal. Also, if the car detects a turn with more than half a g-force (5 m/s²), it eases the rear-wheel regenerative braking to prevent slides.

== Lithium-ion battery conversion ==
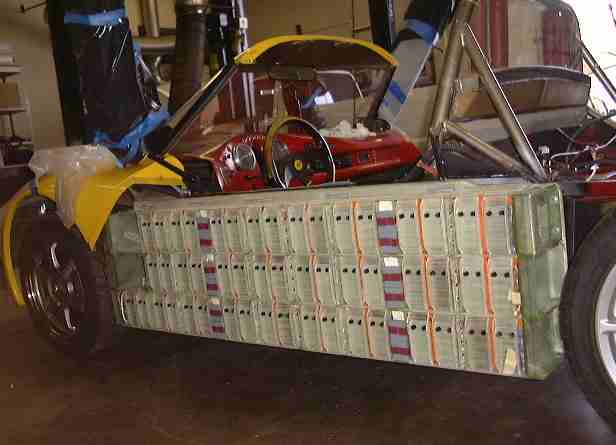
New lithium-ion battery pack

Tom Gage was contacted by Martin Eberhard about the tZero car which Gage had built, and was currently converting to lithium batteries, similar to those that make up the battery packs of laptop computers. Gage stated that Eberhard had multiple "schemes" and that he had to explain to Eberhard how unfeasible most of his concepts were. The conversion was done over six months from March through September, 2003 and gave the tZero a 300-mile (480 km) range. Lighter than the original version by 500 lb (230 kg), the lithium-ion conversion goes from 0–60 mph (0–97 km/h) in 3.6 seconds. The single gear ratio limits the car's maximum speed to just over 140 mph (230 km/h) at 13,000 rpm with proper gearing, though it has never been tested at greater than the electronic limit of 105 mph (169 km/h). The base price of the car was US$220,000. Elon Musk and Martin Eberhard encouraged Tom Gage and Alan Cocconi to move the lithium-ion powered prototype into production. Eberhard then borrowed the converted tZero for three months and used it as a daily driver. The 2003 Li-ion tZero version achieved over 320 miles range per charge.

JB Straubel then told Elon Musk about the newly converted, now lithium-ion powered tZero and arranged a test drive. Musk also encouraged AC Propulsion to commercialize the vehicle. Tom Gage, however, again deferred in favor of working on their electrified Scion xB called the eBox. But he put Elon Musk in contact with Martin Eberhard which led to Elon Musk's Series A funding of Tesla Motors in April, 2004 and their hiring JB Straubel.

== Long Ranger genset trailer ==
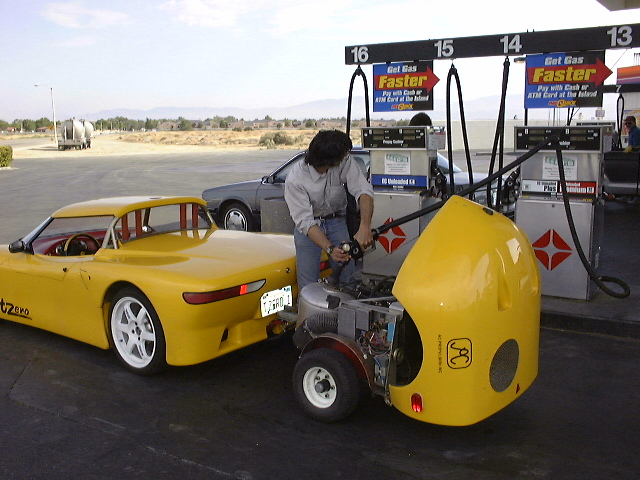
ACP backtracking genset trailer

AC Propulsion also built a range extender for the tZero. Known as the Long Ranger, it was a portable internal combustion powered generator mounted on a trailer that could be towed behind the car and feed power to the batteries during travel. A tZero with Long Ranger was a series hybrid. The trailer used a 500 cc Kawasaki engine with a 9.5 US gallons (36 L) fuel tank and achieved 30 mpg_{‑US} (7.8 L/100 km) in highway driving over at least 20,000 miles (32,000 km). It was rated at 20 kW (27 hp) DC output and could maintain 60–80 mph (97–129 km/h). The trailer incorporated a novel "backtracking" feature that automatically steered the trailer wheels allowing even novice drivers to easily back a trailer through complex maneuvers; the company published a video demonstrating the ease with which the trailer could be backed through a set of slalom cones.

== Production ==
As of August 2023, only 2 of the 3 tZero production models remain, since Gruber Motor Company's car was destroyed in a building fire in May 2017. The surviving two models are displayed at the Petersen Automotive Museum.

== See also ==
- La Jamais Contente
- Keio University Eliica
- Lightning GT
- Think Global AS
- Venturi Fétish
- Wrightspeed X1
- Aptera Motors
- Tesla Roadster
