= AC Propulsion eBox =

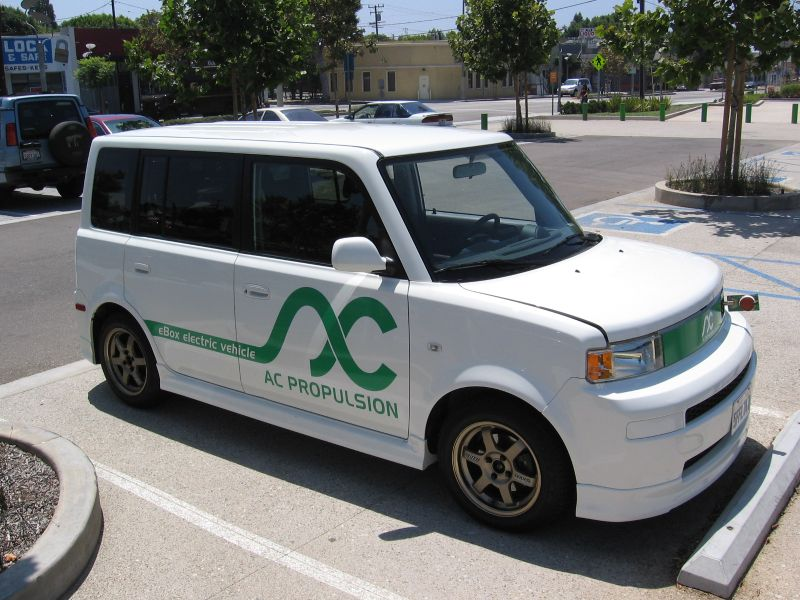

Overview
- Manufacturer: AC Propulsion
- Production: 2007-2009
- Designer: AC Propulsion, Toyota

Body and chassis
- Class: Mini MPV
- Body style: 5-door hatchback
- Layout: Front-engine, Front-wheel drive
- Platform: Toyota Scion xB
- Related: AC Propulsion tzero Tesla Roadster

Powertrain
- Electric motor: 3-phase, 4-pole AC induction

Dimensions
- Wheelbase: 2,499 millimetres (98.4 in)
- Length: 3,944 millimetres (155.3 in)
- Width: 1,689 millimetres (66.5 in)
- Height: 1,641 millimetres (64.6 in)
- Curb weight: 1,383 kilograms (3,049 lb)

Chronology
- Predecessor: AC Propulsion tzero

The eBox is a conversion of a Scion xB hatchback into a battery electric vehicle produced by the American company AC Propulsion.

== History ==
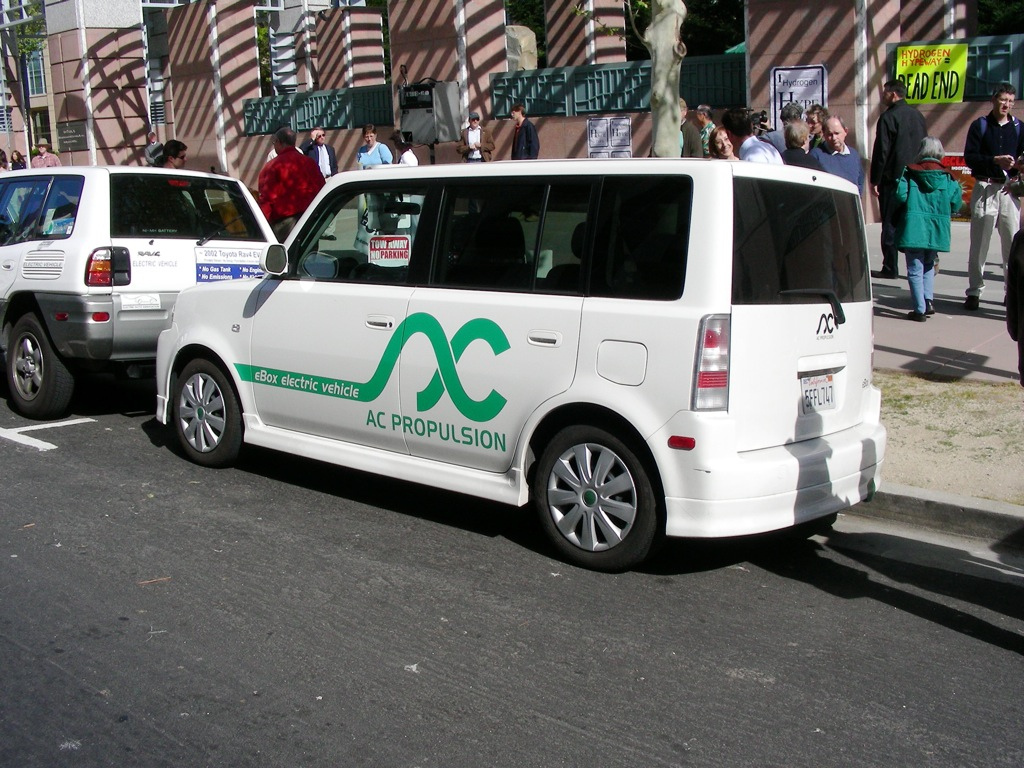
Lateral view of the AC Propulsion eBox

AC Propulsion executives announced their intention to convert Scion xBs to battery electric vehicles in October, 2003. Company executives stated that the Scion xB was chosen in part due to its boxy shape which allows for good placement and installation of a battery pack. The availability of a suitable battery was said to be an important step in allowing for the announcement of the program. Suitability requirements included that the battery be widely available ("off the shelf"), in volume, without danger that supply would be cut off or be overly limited. Thousands of lithium-ion batteries, of the 18650 variant, were proposed as suitable for the rechargeable battery system.

The prototype eBox was unveiled in Santa Monica, California on August 18, 2006. The prototype used a battery pack consisting of 5,300 Li-ion cells arranged into 100 blocks of 53 cells each.

The first production eBox was delivered to actor Tom Hanks on February 15, 2007.

== Pricing ==
Estimated cost of this conversion exceeds US$50,000 in addition to the base vehicle cost (excluding the cost of the gasoline engine, that is replaced in the conversion), while high-volume OEM additional cost is projected at about $10,000. It appears that high-volume production by original vehicle manufacturers using AC production components is a goal, with the low-volume production being an intermediate step.

AC Propulsion offered the conversion for US$55,000.

== Specifications ==
- Acceleration: 0 to 60 mph in 7.0 seconds.
- Top Speed: 95 mph (153 km/h)
- Range: 140–180 miles (230–290 km)
- Motor: 150 kW (200 hp) AC induction motor
- Battery pack: 5,088 Li-Ion cells, 355V nominal, 35kWh, 600 lb (270 kg)
- Battery charger: On board, 100-250VAC, 50/60 Hz, includes Vehicle to Grid (V2G) and UPS (generator mode) capability
  - Charge rate: up to 20 kW; 30 minutes for 20–50 miles
  - Full Charge: 2 hours (fast), 5 hours (normal)
- Energy Efficiency: 180 AC Wh/km in typical driving (648 kJ/km)
