= Revo Powertrains =

Revo Powertrains is an electric vehicle powertrain company based in Alameda, California. It was created by Tesla co-founder Ian Wright.

== Products ==
The Wrightspeed Route is a plug and play repower kit for commercial trucks. It is a high-power medium-duty vehicle powertrain that uses electric drive with an onboard power station for efficiency and range. This is a series hybrid retrofit kit for trucks. The kit includes controls, 200 kW inverter, electric motors, gearbox with clutchless shifting, battery pack, battery management system, and LCD user interface.

Medium-duty trucks in the US are defined as vehicles with gross vehicle weights of 4,500–11,800 kg (10,001–26,000 lb).

Founder Ian Wright discusses motivations for building truck powertrains in a TedX Talk and Unfiltered interview.

=== Wrightspeed X1 ===
X1 Prototype
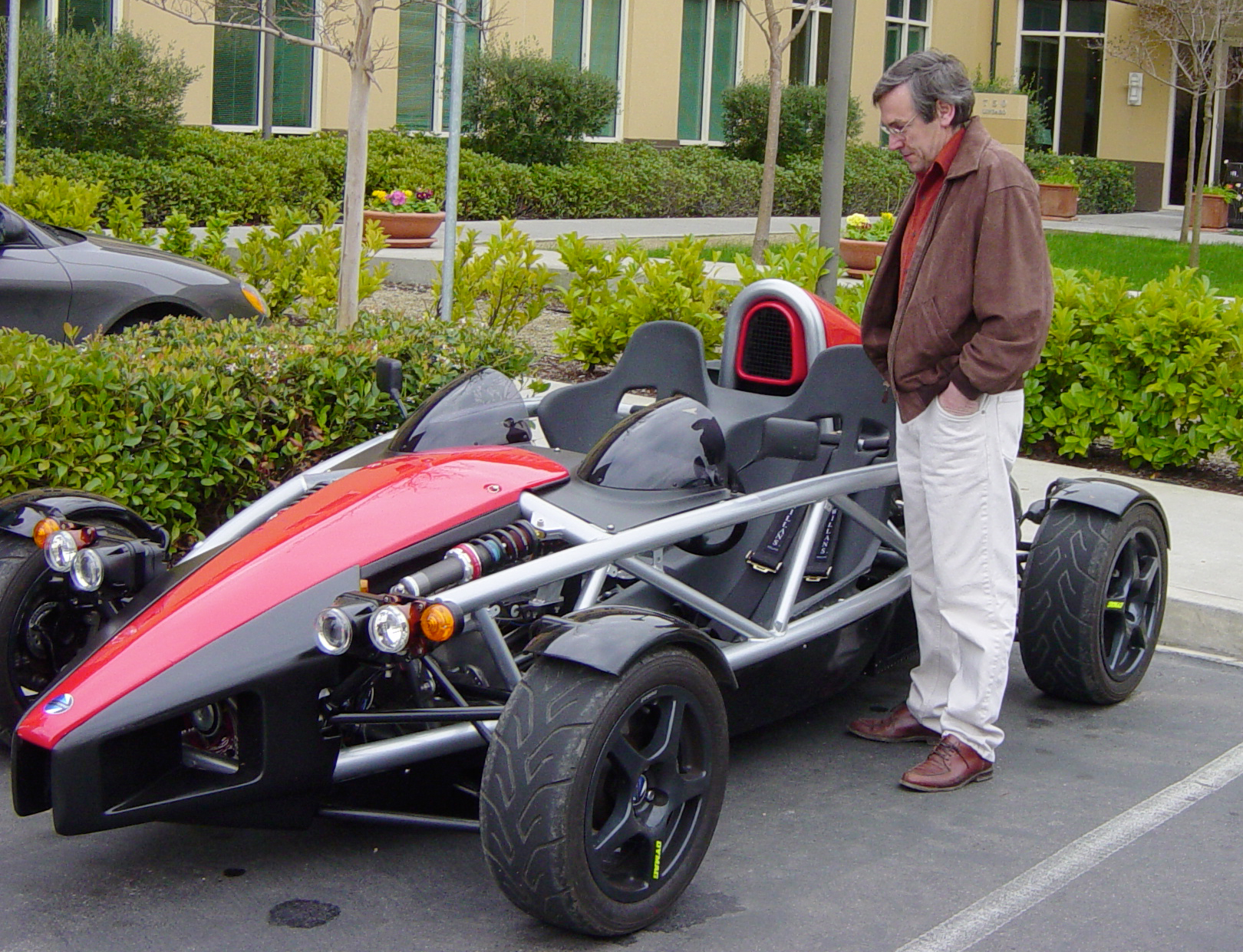

Overview
- Manufacturer: Wrightspeed
- Production: None, prototype only
- Designer: Ian Wright

Body and chassis
- Class: Roadster
- Body style: Open wheel roadster
- Layout: Rear mid-motor, rear-wheel drive
- Platform: Ariel Atom
- Related: Ariel Atom, tzero

Powertrain
- Electric motor: 3-phase, 4-pole AC Induction
- Transmission: Single gear ratio 8.25:1 (no clutch)

Dimensions
- Wheelbase: 2345 mm / 92.3 in
- Length: 3410 mm / 134.25 in
- Width: 1798 mm / 70.8 in
- Height: 1195 mm / 47.0 in
- Curb weight: 697 kg / 1536 lb

The Wrightspeed X1 is a one-off Ariel Atom heavily modified to use an all-electric powertrain. The Atom was chosen for its light weight and efficient design. The electric motor and inverter are sourced from AC Propulsion, makers of the TZero concept car, while the batteries are low weight, high energy density lithium ion provided from A123 Systems. As with the Atom the transmission is a Honda unit, but stripped of its shifting mechanism and other parts to provide only the second gear speed, allowed by the wide speed and torque range available from the electric motor.

Built by San Francisco-based New Zealand engineer Ian Wright, the X1 created a stir when it bested several sports cars in a drag race, including a Carrera GT (even with a rolling start, an advantage for the gas burning vehicles), all while being filmed by local news station KRON 4. Despite the impressive performance, the vehicle is intended only as a proof of concept. Future production is planned; however, according to the website, "... the production car will be quite different, since it will meet the safety standards, which the prototype does not. It will, however, be at least as quick as the prototype.". Mr. Wright was a co-founder of electric-car company Tesla Motors, but has since left to pursue his own ideas.

==== Performance ====
- 0–97 km/h (0–60 mph) 2.9 seconds
- Standing 400 m (1/4 mile) 11.6 seconds
- Top speed 167 km/h (104 mph) (electronically limited)
- Range greater than 160 km (100 miles) in urban use
- Charger: onboard conductive. Input 100–250 V 50 or 60 Hz
- Current: user adjustable up to 80 A
- Energy consumption 120 W⋅h/km (200 W⋅h/mi) in urban use, equivalent to 170 mpg_{‑US} (1.4 L/100 km; 200 mpg_{‑imp}) or 33,705 W⋅h/US gal (8,905 W⋅h/L; 40,480 W⋅h/imp gal)

==== The X1 prototype (various technical images) ====
Most of these images are applicable to the Ariel Atom

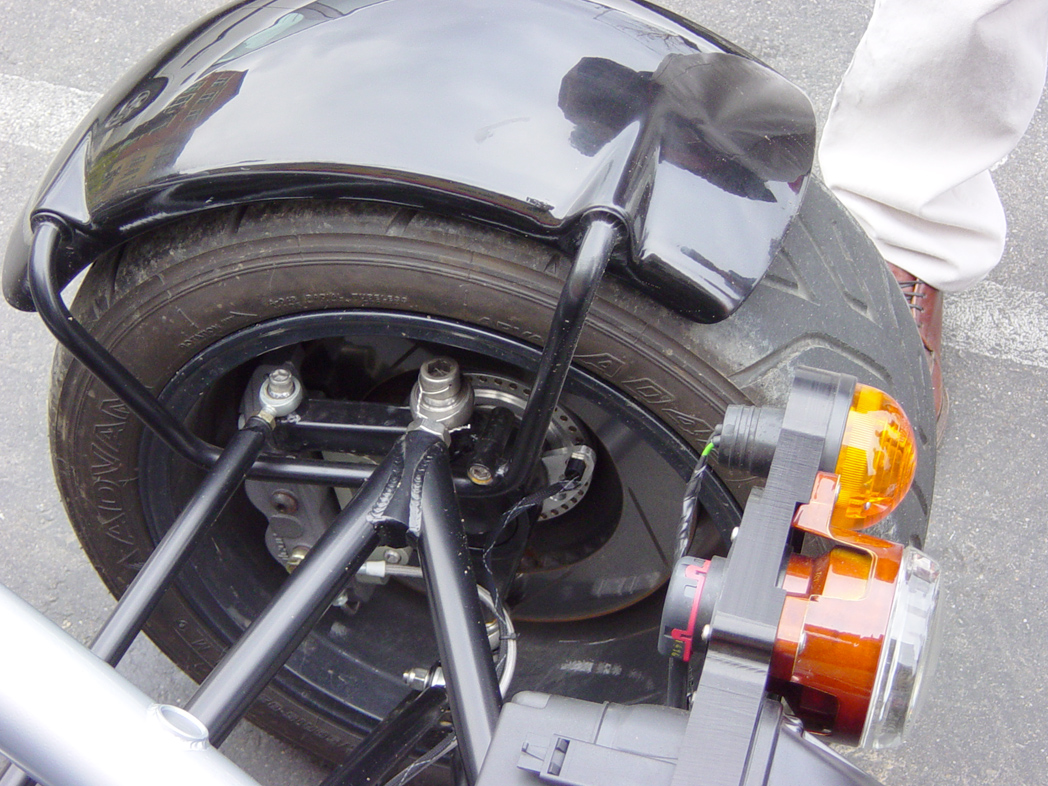
Front wheel and brake

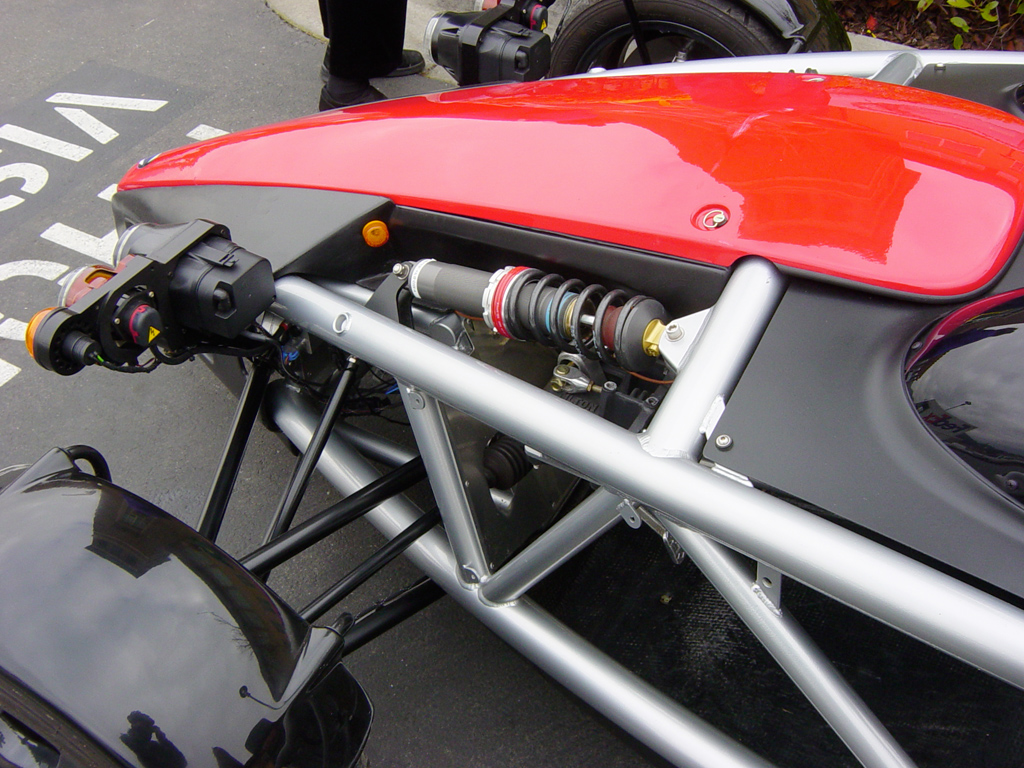
Springs and shock absorber

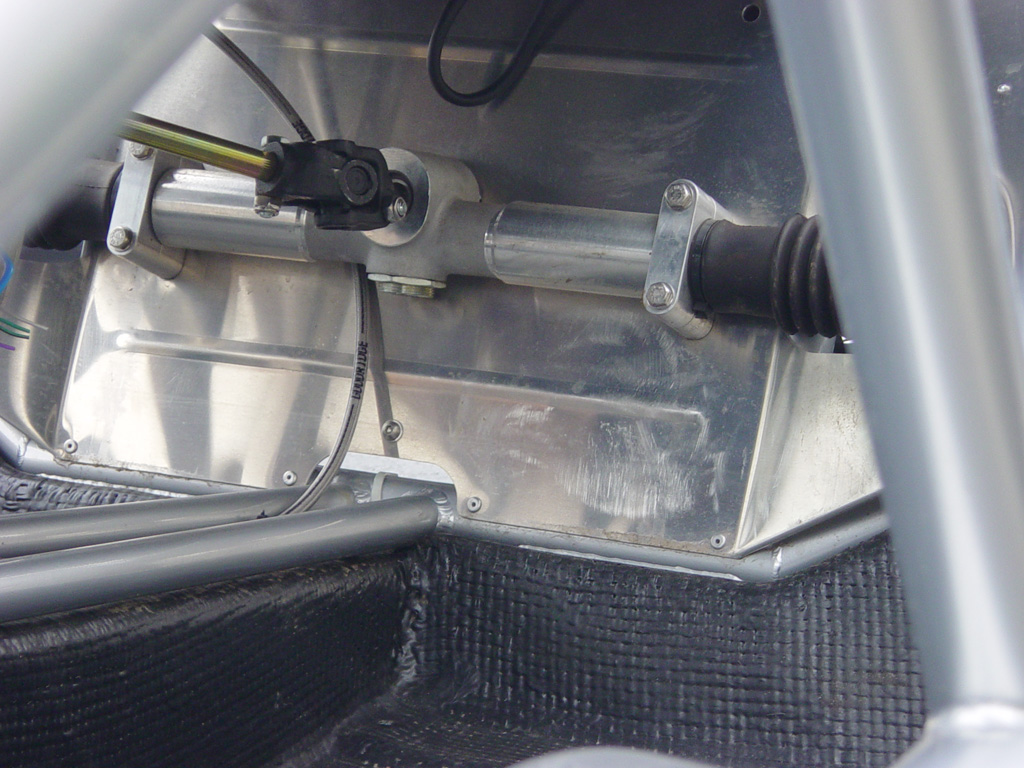
Steering rack

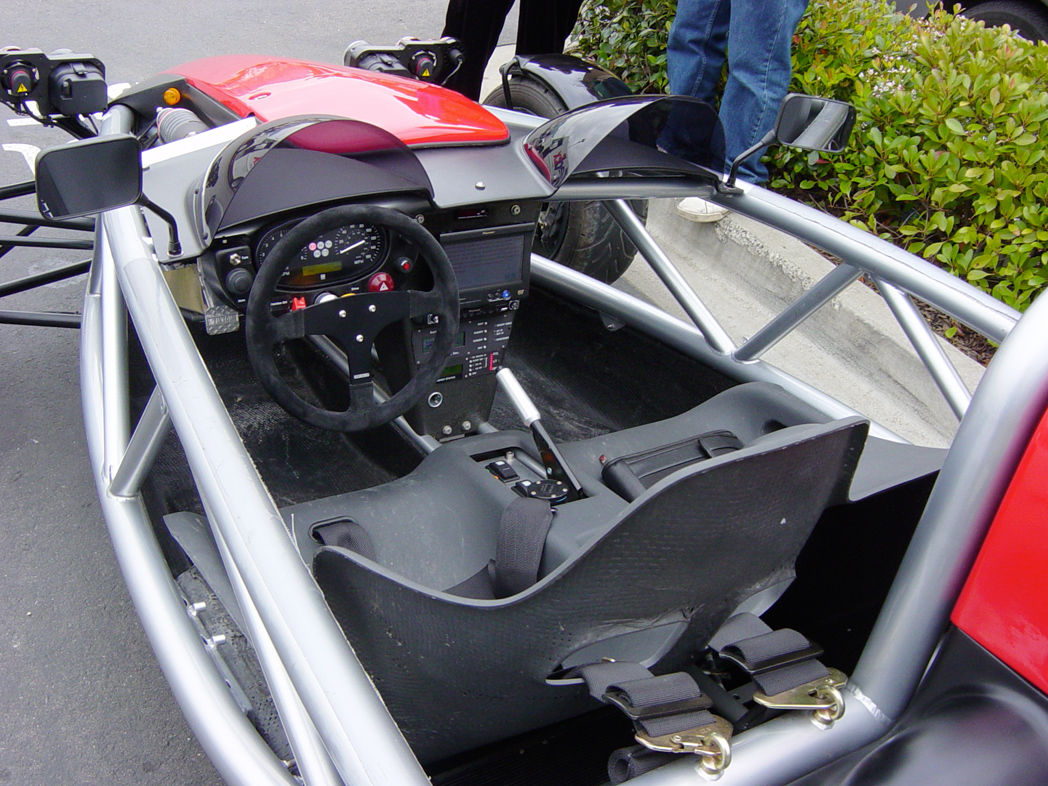
Cockpit

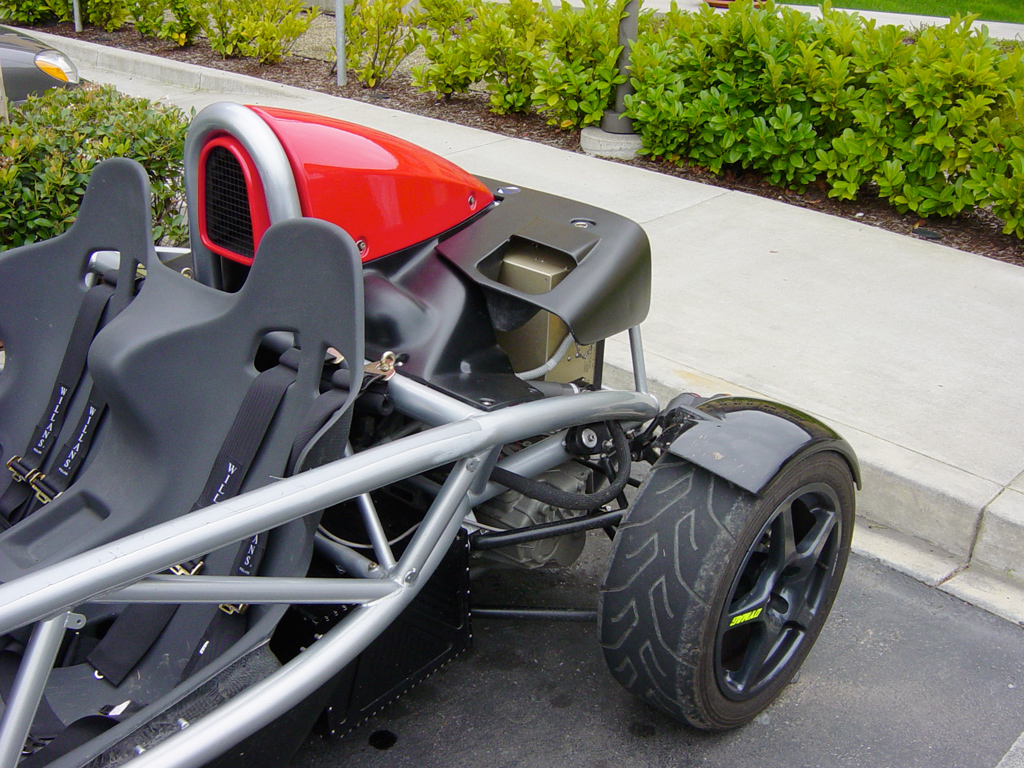
Rear suspension

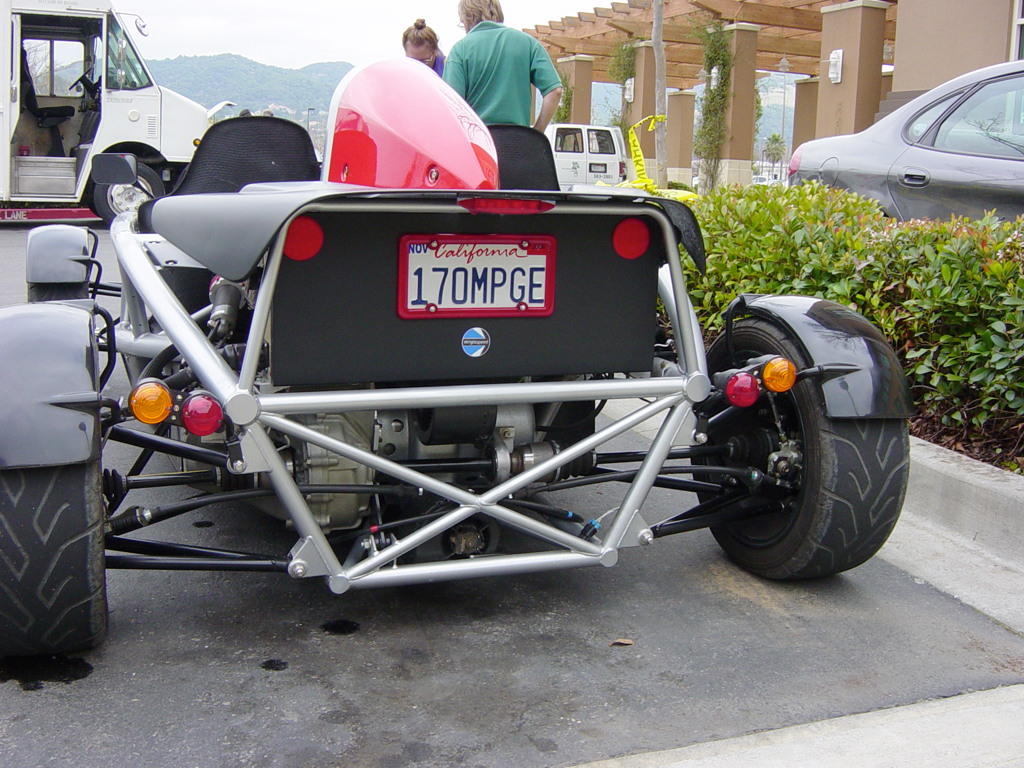
Rear view

== Energy Efficiency ==
Central to Revo Powertrains' ethos is energy efficiency.

== Clients ==
- FedEx
- NZ Bus

== See also ==
- Battery electric vehicle
- Electric truck
- Fleet operator
- Garbage truck
- Isuzu NPR
- Tesla Motors
- Vehicle manufacturer
- Wrightspeed X1, a one-off Ariel Atom heavily modified to use an all-electric powertrain, made by Wrightspeed.
