= Zoop (social network) =

American social media platform

- Website type: Social networking service
- Available in: Multilingual
- Area served: Worldwide
- Founders: Tim Stokely; RJ Phillips
- Website: zoop.com
- Launched: April 23, 2026; 6 months ago

Zoop (stylized in all caps) is an American social media platform.

== Launch ==
Zoop was founded in 2020 by RJ Phillips and Tim Stokely, co-founders of OnlyFans. The platform was originally meant to serve as a way to facilitate digital fan interactions through digital avatars, as well as way to trade NFTs. However, following the failiures of Meta's Metaverse and NFTs, they switched to content creation. The platform launched on 23 April 2026 with two upcoming partnerships: the 2026 Enhanced Games and the Eurovision Song Contest Asia 2026.

== Monetisation ==
The app is reportedly meant to pay out up to 80% of earned revenue to the users that generate it.

== Content ==
The platform contains an "AI filter" to block content generated using artificial intelligence upon user request.

== Business ==
In 2025, Zoop made an offer to buy TikTok.
