= Great Transcontinental Electric Car Race =

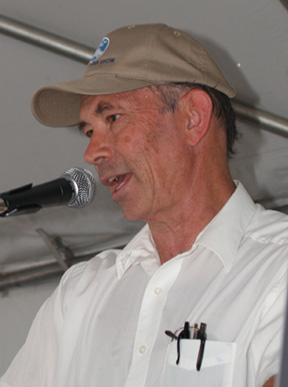
Race winner Wally Rippel at the Clean Car Show, 2007

In 1968, the Great Transcontinental Electric Car Race was held between student groups at Caltech and MIT.

The Caltech team, led by EV pioneer Wally Rippel, converted a 1958 VW Microbus powered by lead cobalt batteries from Electric Fuel Propulsion Corporation of Detroit. The MIT team converted a 1968 Chevrolet Corvair powered by NiCad batteries. The MIT team raced from Cambridge, Massachusetts, to Pasadena, California, while the Caltech team raced the opposite direction. A network of 54 charging locations were set up along the 3,311-mile route, spaced 21 to 95 miles apart.

The race began on August 26, 1968, and ended on September 4. Although the MIT team reached Pasadena first, they were towed part of the way. After assessing penalty points, Caltech was declared the winner with a corrected time of 210 hours 3 minutes.
