= Tesla Roadster =

Tesla Roadster may refer to:

- Tesla Roadster (first generation), an electric sports car produced by Tesla Motors between 2008 and 2012
  - Elon Musk's Tesla Roadster, a first generation Tesla Roadster that was launched into space in February 2018
- Tesla Roadster (second generation), an upcoming sports car in development by Tesla, Inc.
