= Wally Rippel =

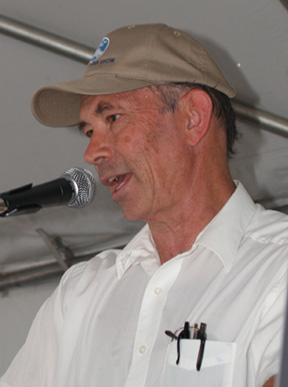
Wally Rippel at the Clean Car Show, 7-22-2007

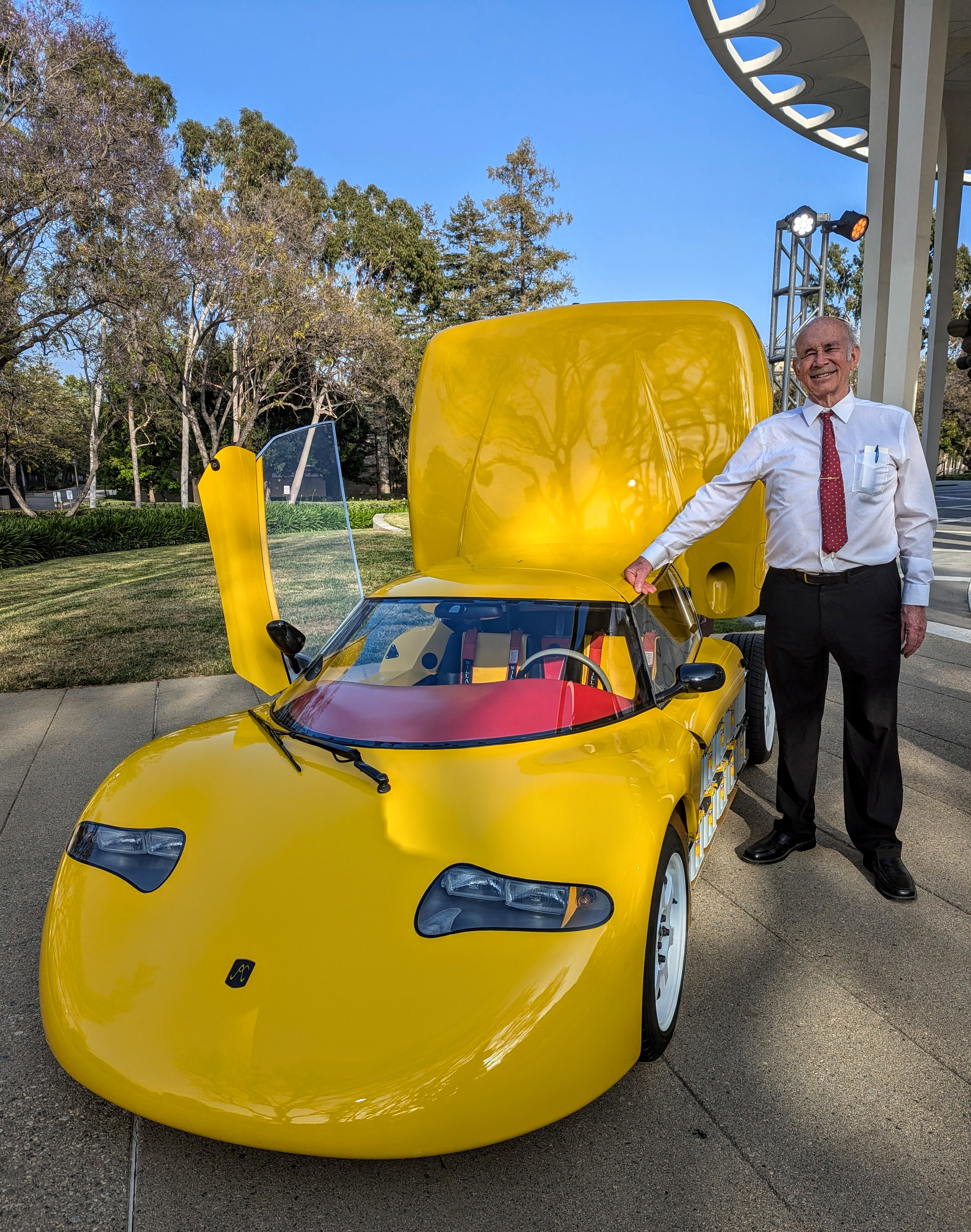
Rippel showing his AC Propulsion tzero prototype at Caltech in 2024

Wally E. Rippel is a long-time developer and advocate of battery electric vehicles.

Wally has a prominent role, labeled as himself, "Research Engineer, AeroVironment," in the 2006 documentary movie Who Killed the Electric Car?, including two brief scenes in the official trailer.

In 1968, as an undergraduate student, he built the Caltech electric car (a converted 1958 VW microbus) and won the Great Transcontinental Electric Car Race against MIT.

In the 1970s and 1980s, Rippel worked for the Jet Propulsion Laboratory on electric vehicle battery research, among other things.

Around 1990, Rippel joined AeroVironment and helped to design the GM Impact, later named the EV1; he had worked on the induction motor for the car before joining AeroVironment. In 2003, he was one of the participants in the mock funeral for the EV1 as GM prepared to collect the last few for crushing.

Rippel left AeroVironment in 2006 and joined Tesla Motors, where he continued his lifelong work on the battery electric car. He left Tesla in 2008.

== See also ==
- Battery electric vehicle (BEV)
- Who Killed the Electric Car?
- Tesla Roadster (2008)
