= Courreges ZOOOP =

Electric concept car

The Courreges Zooop was a three-seat electric concept car built in 2006 by the Paris-based fashion house Maison de Courrèges.

The Zooop's electric powertrain produced 150 kW (201 hp) and reportedly had a range of 450 km (280 mi), with a curb weight of 690 kg (1,521 lb). The car was not produced for a car manufacturer, but by the fashion design house Maison de Courrèges, which did not promote the car outside of France.
