= Customised buses =

Bus modified for decorative purposes

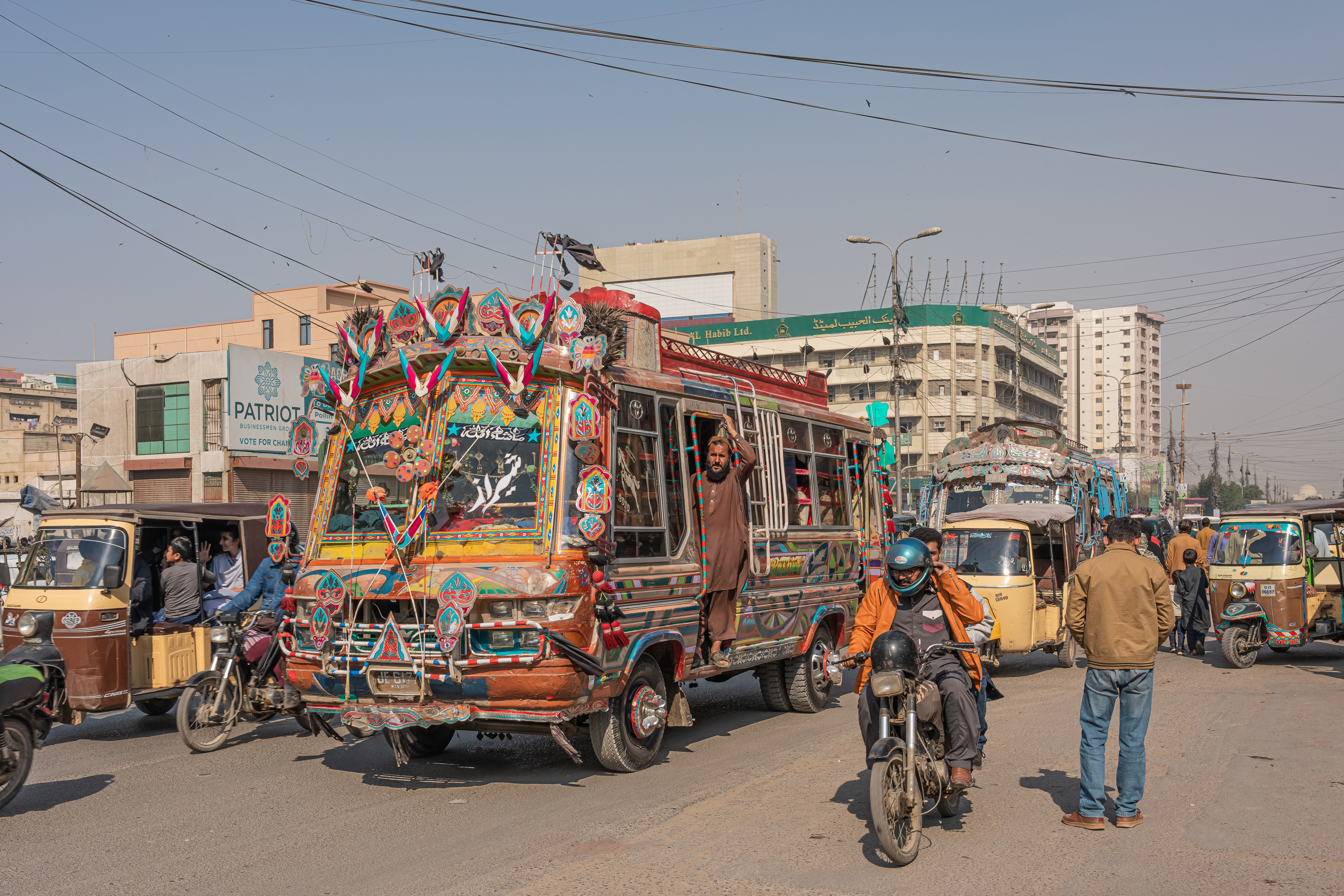
Customised bus in Pakistan

Customised buses are buses that have been modified for decorative purposes. The customisation is unrelated to performing their job or work, usually as public transport buses. Customised buses are also sometimes not used for a job or work, and are decorated as personal projects for exhibition, although this is rare compared to other types of art vehicle such as cars, bikes and customised trucks.

== Customisation detail ==
The customisation usually involves:

- Custom exterior and interior paint schemes, including phrases and proverbs and people, such as religious icons.
- Extra decorative visual elements, such as extra lights and reflectors, flags, banners and bunting or religious symbols and artefacts.
- Modified body parts such more elaborate grilles, wheel arches, exhausts

== Incidences of customisation ==
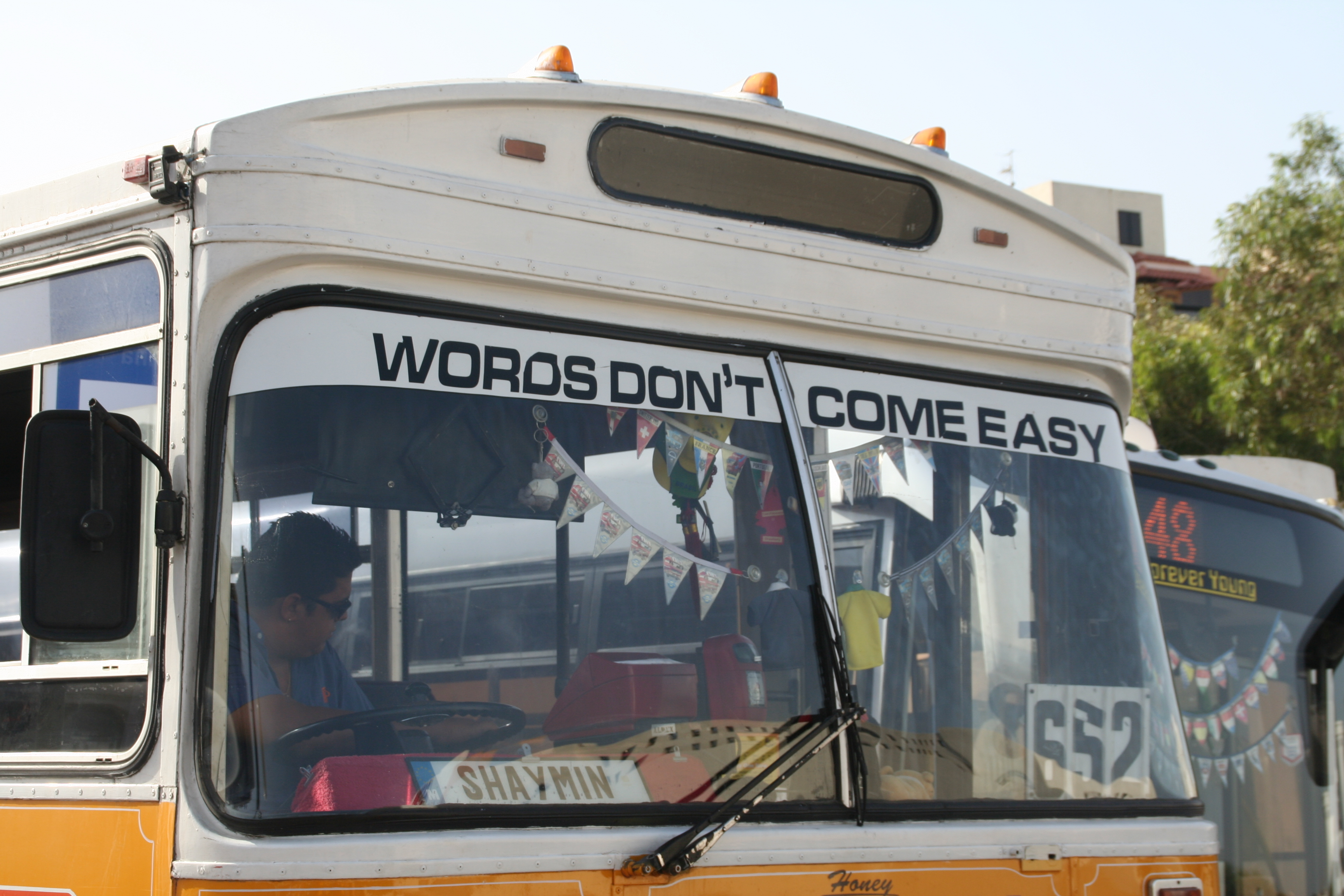
Slogan on a Malta bus

The island of Malta has had a long tradition of customising their buses used for public transport, due to the variety of models imported, and the small nature of garage facilities. The customisation in Malta is understated compared to other countries. In the 2000s a drive was initiated to update the fleet with more modern buses, but historic examples remain, and the tradition of customisation has continued for the modern models.

The Colectivo urban buses of Argentina, particularly Buenos Aires, were historically highly-customised with a technique called fileteado, dating back to the 1920s. The practice of customisation continued until the adoption of more modern public transport buses which saw the practice fade out. Historic customised Colectivos are now prized museum exhibits, or have been restored as private vehicles.

The Chiva Buses of Colombia are hand-built on truck chassis, used as both public transport and for private hire for parties, including as a novelty attraction in New York City.

The jeep derived "Jeepney" share taxis of the Philippines have grown in capacity to the size of minibuses and are still being built by small scale manufacturers, although are facing calls for their reduction in number and competition with regular public transport.

Pakistan has a long tradition of highly customising buses (and trucks).

El Salvador has a history of highly customized buses used for public transport. These are typically owned by the gangs, and thus are not operated by a government agency.

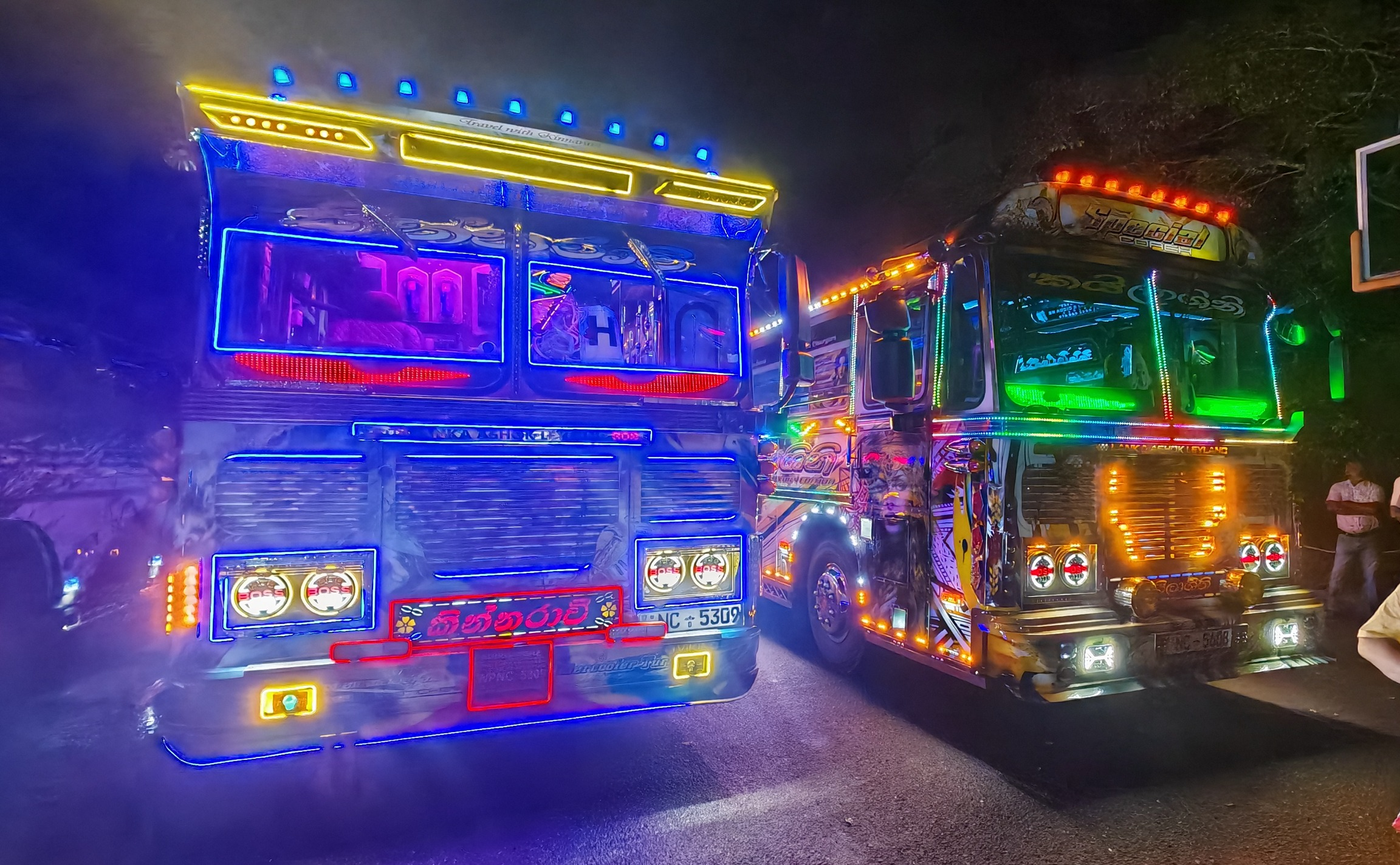
Modified Sri Lankan trip buses at night

Sri Lanka has a prominent 'trip bus' subculture, in which chartered private buses are transformed into mobile party venues for trips and pilgrimages. These buses feature extreme vehicle customization, including vibrant exterior vinyl wraps, complex LED or neon lighting setups, massive high-wattage sound systems, and outdoor DJs. Each bus is typically given a unique, highly stylized name, and individual vehicles often earn a massive following on social media platforms.

== Other types of customised buses ==
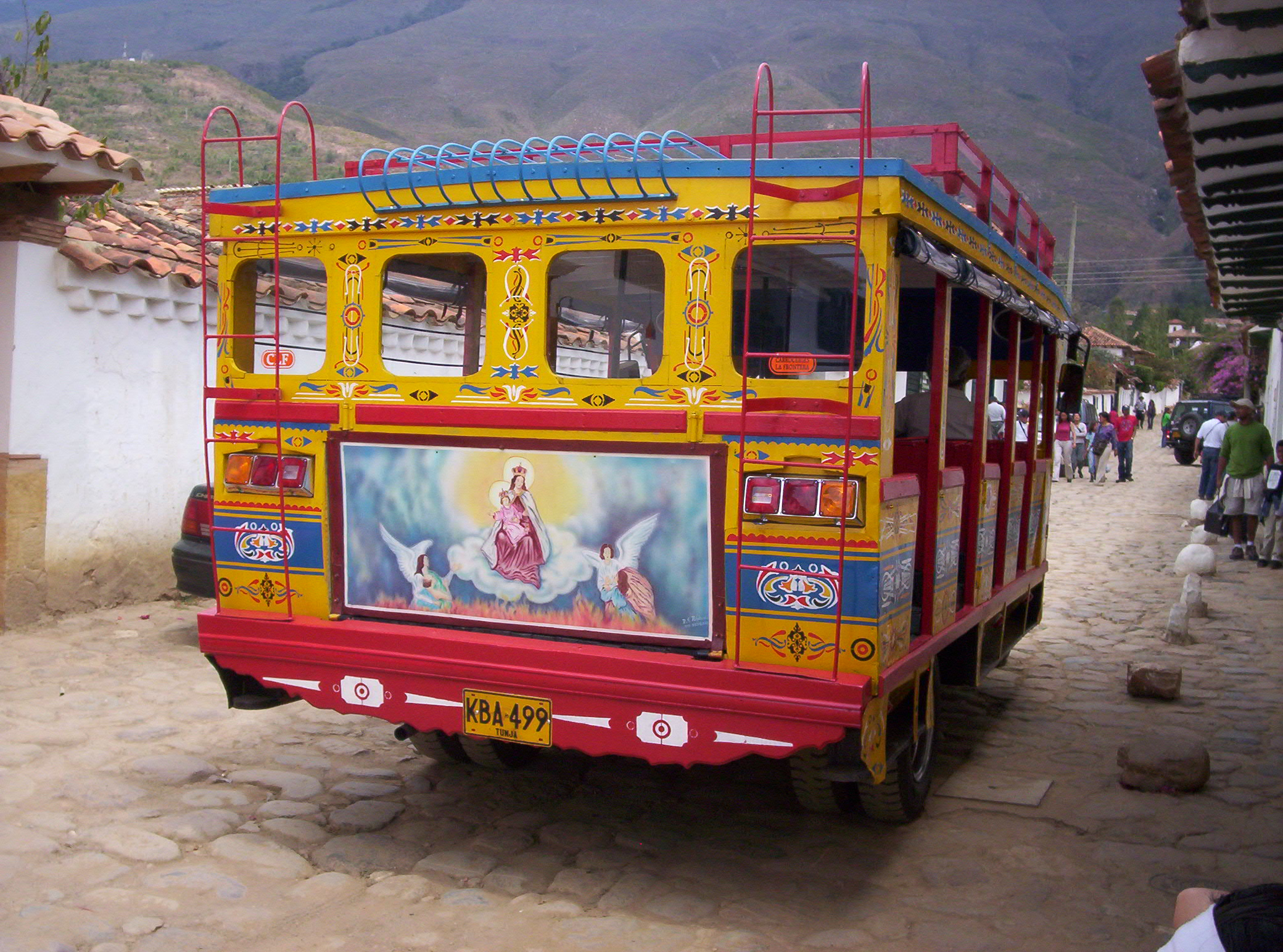
Mural on a Chiva bus

Advert buses, party buses, sleeper buses and tour buses are all types of buses that may feature a degree of decorative customisation as part of their primary function, and not just for personalisation.

== See also ==
- Jingle truck – U.S. army slang for decorated trucks in Asia
- Dekotora – Japanese decorated trucks
- Tap-Tap – Haitian decorated buses
- Jeepney – Philippine decorated buses
- Chicken bus – Central American decorated buses
- Chiva bus – Colombian decorated buses
- Fileteado – Argentine and Uruguayan decorative style widely employed on buses
- Diablos Rojos – Panamanian decorated buses
- Skoolies – school buses converted into recreational vehicles
