= Transportainment =

Transportainment (R) (sometimes misspelled transpotainment) is a tregistered trademark of Historic Tours of America, Inc. The term is a hybrid mixing of the words 'transportation' and 'entertainment'. Transportainment (R) is refers to historic sightseeing tours offered by the company through its subsidiaries, including Old Town Trolley Tours (R). It was misappropriated to describe a type of tourist entertainment in which parties ride in large open-air party buses, moving at slow speeds through the main street of a town, with music and drinking amidst a general revelry.

From 2017 to the present, it has been prevalent on weekend nights in the American city of Nashville, Tennessee, usually lasting into the late hours, on the street called Lower Broadway. Vehicles used to ferry partygoers include decommissioned troop transport trucks, buses, tractor-trailers, stretch limousines, and pickup trucks. One estimate from Nashville authorities was that there were forty private companies offering such services to tourists. Vehicles can hold from 10 to 25 persons. One service termed Hell on Wheels allows partygoers to ride through Nashville while some of the proceeds go to Homes for Troops Charity which builds residences for severely wounded veterans.

The growing practice has been criticized for causing traffic congestion and slowdowns, loud noise, and accidents. According to one account, a person fell off of a moving vehicle which subsequently ran over his legs. The industry was largely unregulated, although in fall of 2021 there were proposals to regulate the practice. Nashville in December 2021 banned open containers of alcohol on open-air party buses, forcing operators to enclose them to serve alcohol. In June 2022 the city restricted their hours of operation, issued permits for dozens of vehicles, and rejected applications for dozens more. Pedal taverns are regulated separately.
