= Truck art =

Truck art may refer to:

- Truck art in South Asia
- Dekotora in Japan
