= Bus transport in Central America =

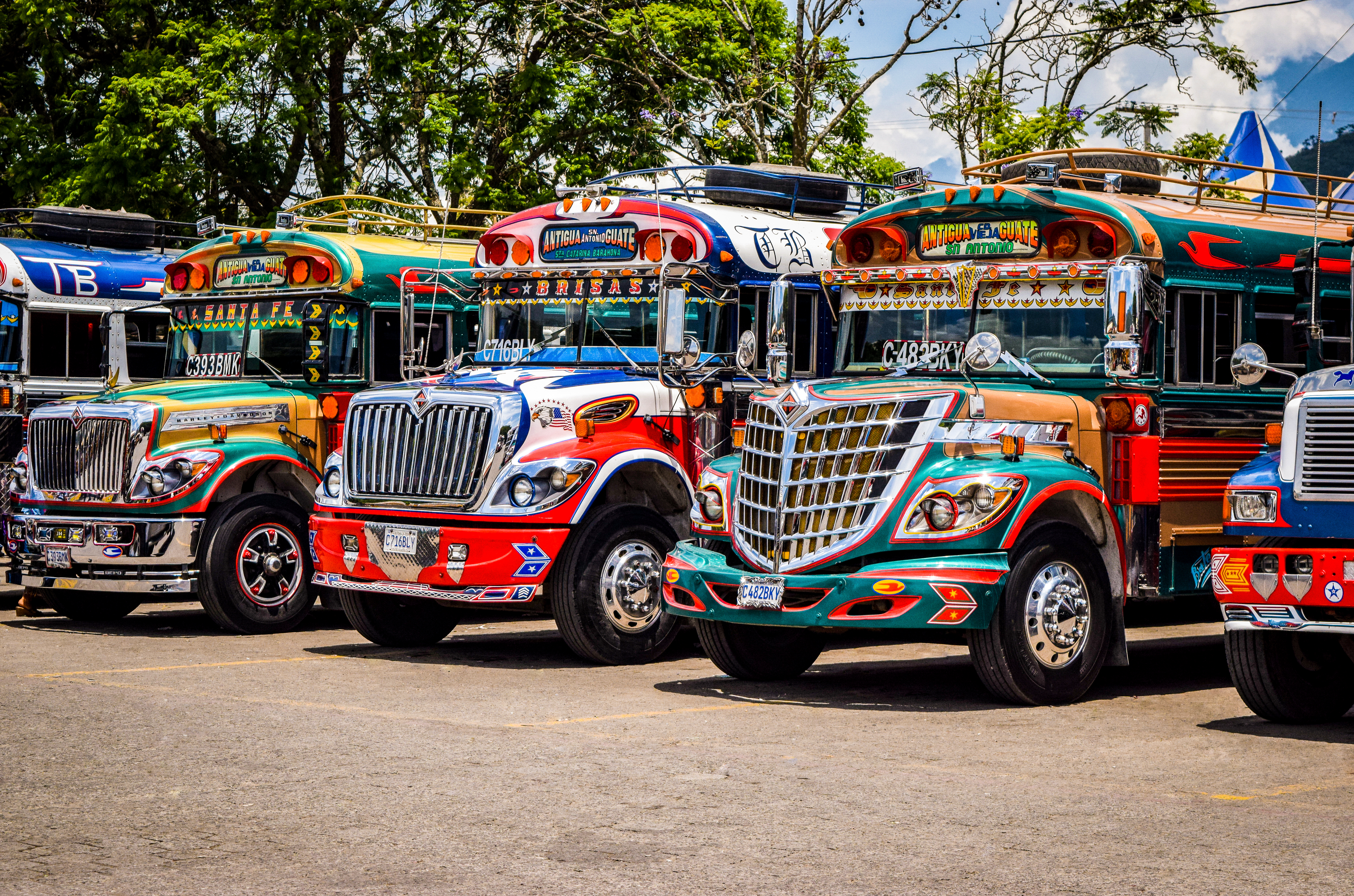
Buses (camionetas) in Antigua, Guatemala.

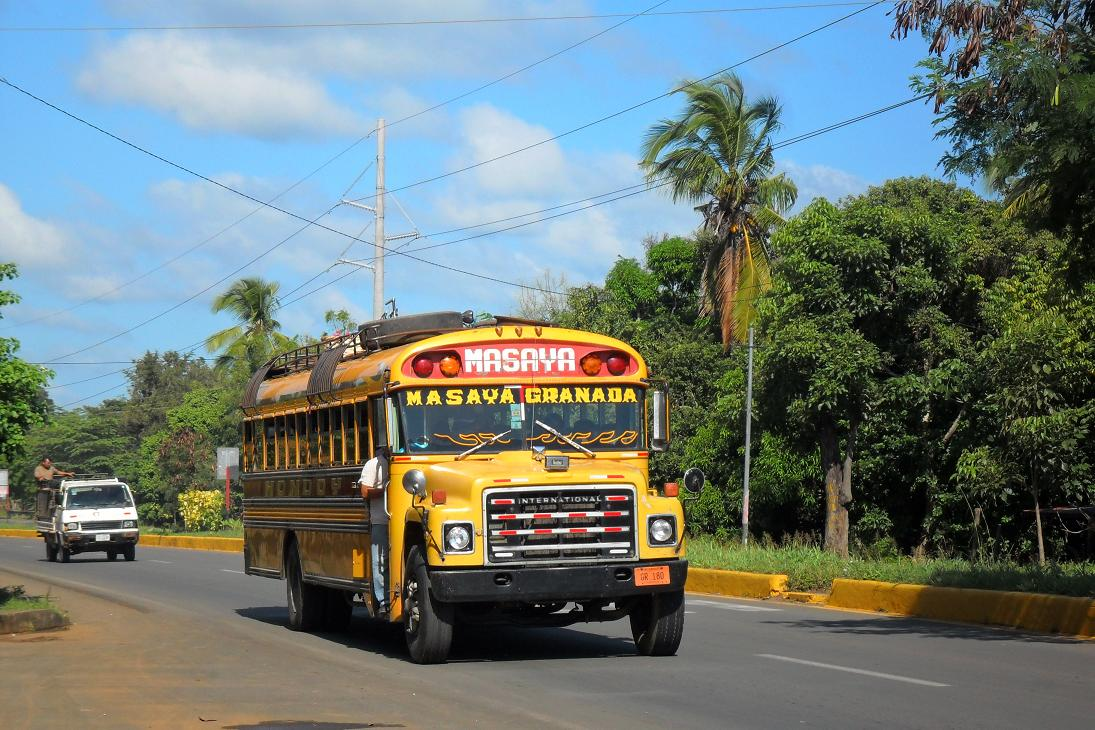
A bus on the Masaya-Granada road, Nicaragua.

Bus transport is a key mode of transportation and plays an important role in commerce across Central America, where personal cars and rail systems are less common compared to wealthier countries.

In the region, these buses are often called "camioneta" or "trambilla" (the latter being a hypercorrection of "tranvía"). They are often modified and brightly decorated to transport both people and goods between communities in countries like Honduras, Guatemala, El Salvador, Nicaragua, Costa Rica, and Panama. In Panama, they are known as Diablos Rojos (Red Devils).

The buses are typically built from retired North American school buses, sometimes with light or medium truck chassis (often Nissan Diesel). In Panama, some are based on Toyota HiAce, Toyota Coaster, or similar passenger vehicles, usually left painted white. When a Toyota Coaster is used, the bus is called a "Chiva," while a Toyota HiAce is referred to as a "busito."

== "Chicken bus" ==
Some English speaking tourists call buses "chicken buses". The word "chicken" may refer to the fact that the buses are often crammed with passengers not unlike a truck load of chickens, or to the fact that Central Americans occasionally transport live animals on such buses—a practice that visitors from other countries often find remarkable. The term "Chicken bus" is not used by locals, and some consider it offensive.

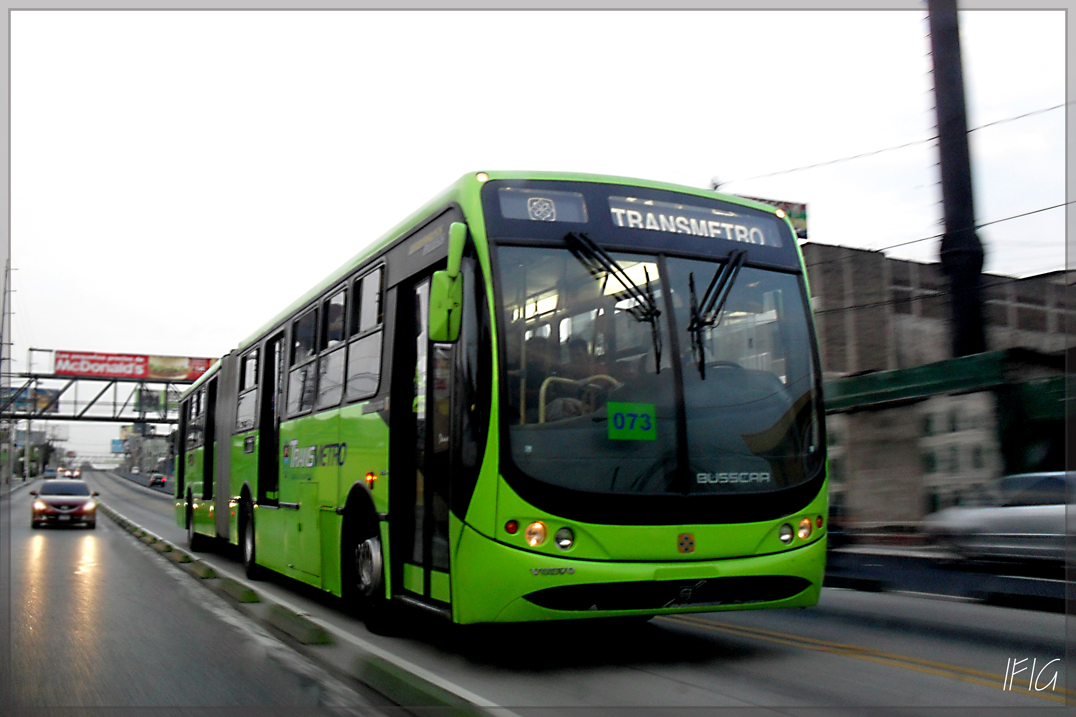
Transmetro bus in Guatemala City

== See also ==
- Chiva bus
- Jeepney
- Tap tap
- Matatu
