= Multicab =

Small light truck used as public transport in the Philippines

A multi cab is a small light truck or kei truck in the Philippines that is usually used as public transport. Like jeepneys, they usually have fixed routes, although there are multicabs that serve as taxicabs to take passengers where they want, as a motorized tricycle might. Aside from being a mode of mass transportation, it can also be customized for other purposes such as a pickup truck or a private van.

Multicabs can be found throughout the Philippines. It can be found in urban areas such as Metro Manila, Metro Cebu, and Metro Davao. A multicab is lightweight, narrow and small and can navigate through narrow streets. With seating capacity of around 11 to 13, the passenger space also tends to be cramped relative to a van. There are also multicabs that have a seating capacity less than 11. Small multicabs typically have three-cylinder engines. In Tacloban, there are plans to convert the multicab engines into rechargeable batteries for sustainable energy.

A multicab is about as comfortable as a jeepney, and usually has a cleaner and less noisy engine. A group travelling by multicab may hire a multicab for a day (e.g., for family use) and pay the daily fee, while optionally buying food and drink for the driver. A multicab is typically assembled in a factory in the Philippines with surplus parts from Japan and South Korea, in contrast to jeepneys, which are usually hand-made. Popular makes are Suzuki models such as the Suzuki Carry, or more its rugged cousin, the Autozam/Mazda Scrum (locally known as "Suzuki" Scrum, due to interchangeability of parts between these two vehicles). Multicab models sometimes also using Daihatsu Hijet and Mitsubishi Minicab.

As part of the Public Utility Vehicle Modernization Program, multicabs operating as public transport must be built according to the Class 1 standard. Such microbuses are often airconditioned, feature a side door (both automatic and manually opened), a much taller ceiling (150 centimeters), and can typically seat 9 to 13 passengers.

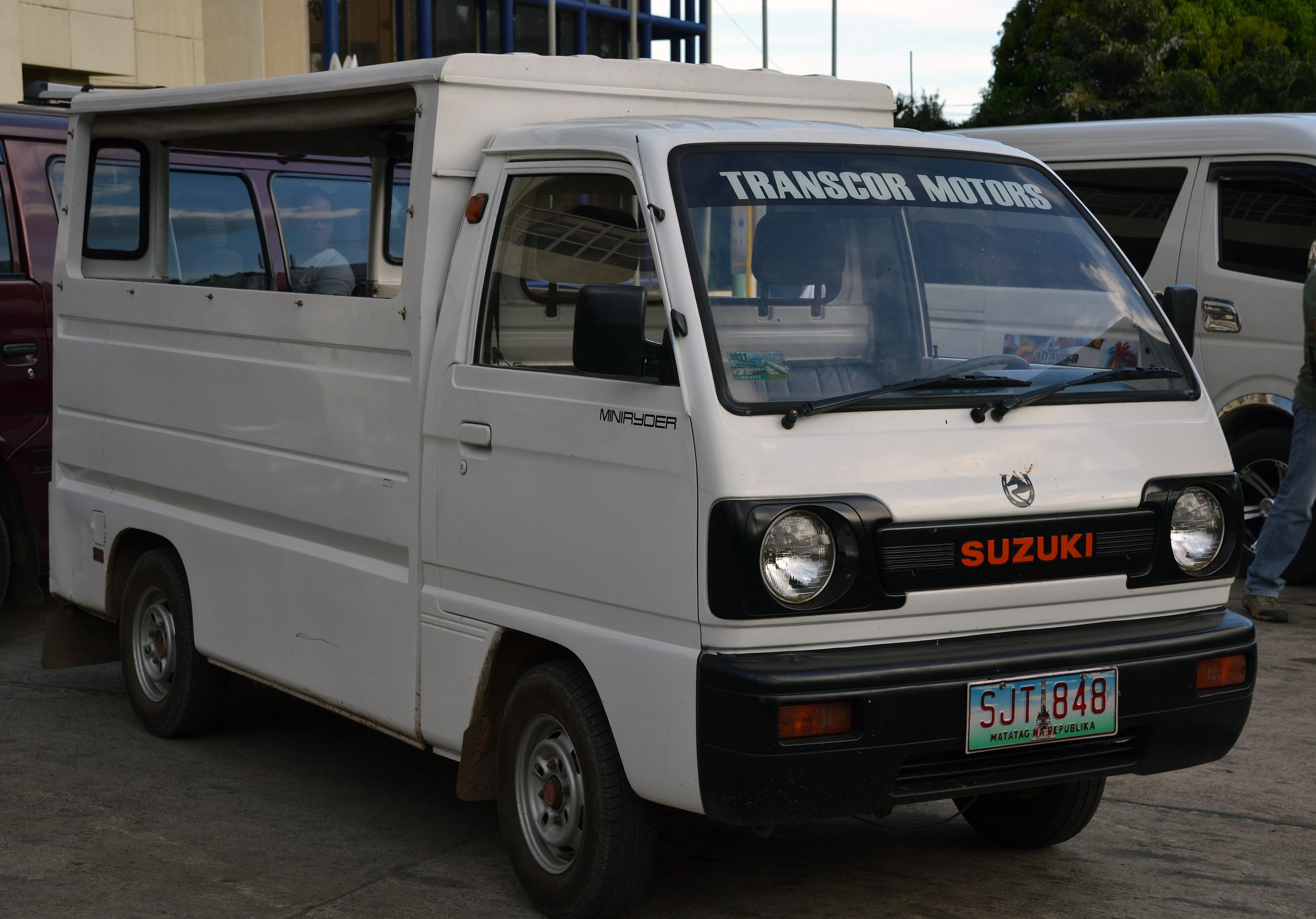
A Suzuki Carry multicab

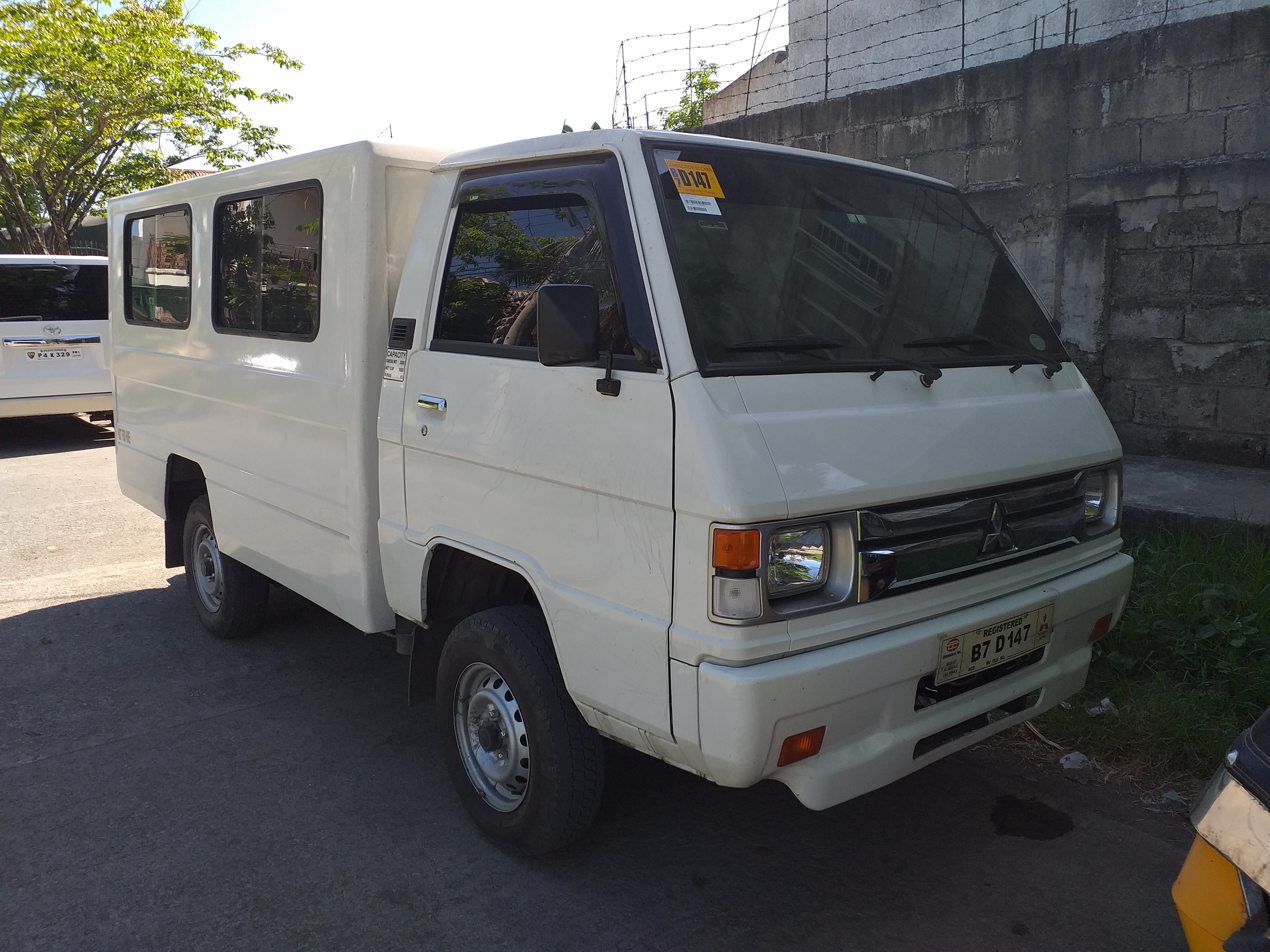
A Mitsubishi L300 multicab

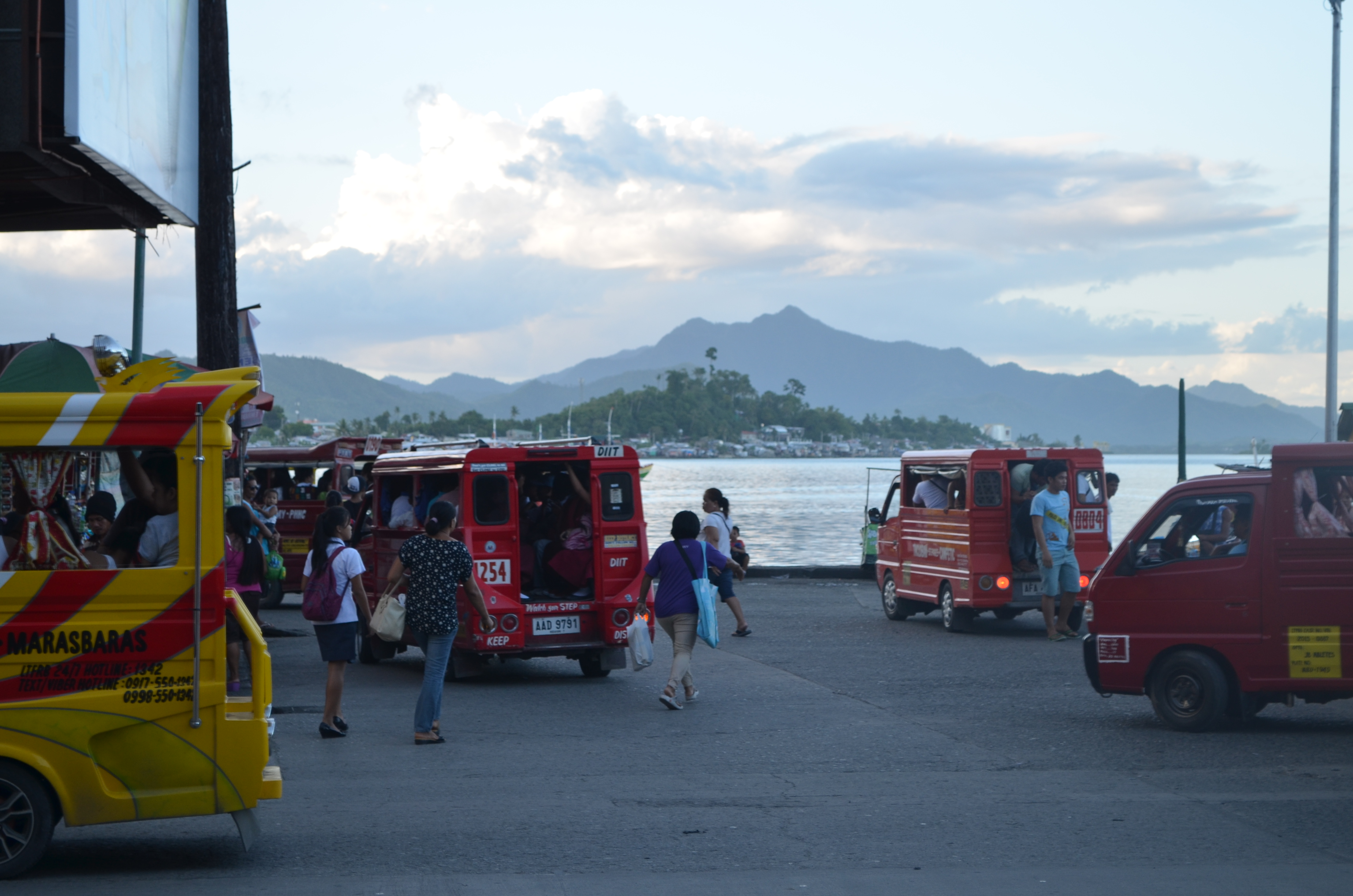
Multicabs plying in Downtown Tacloban, Leyte

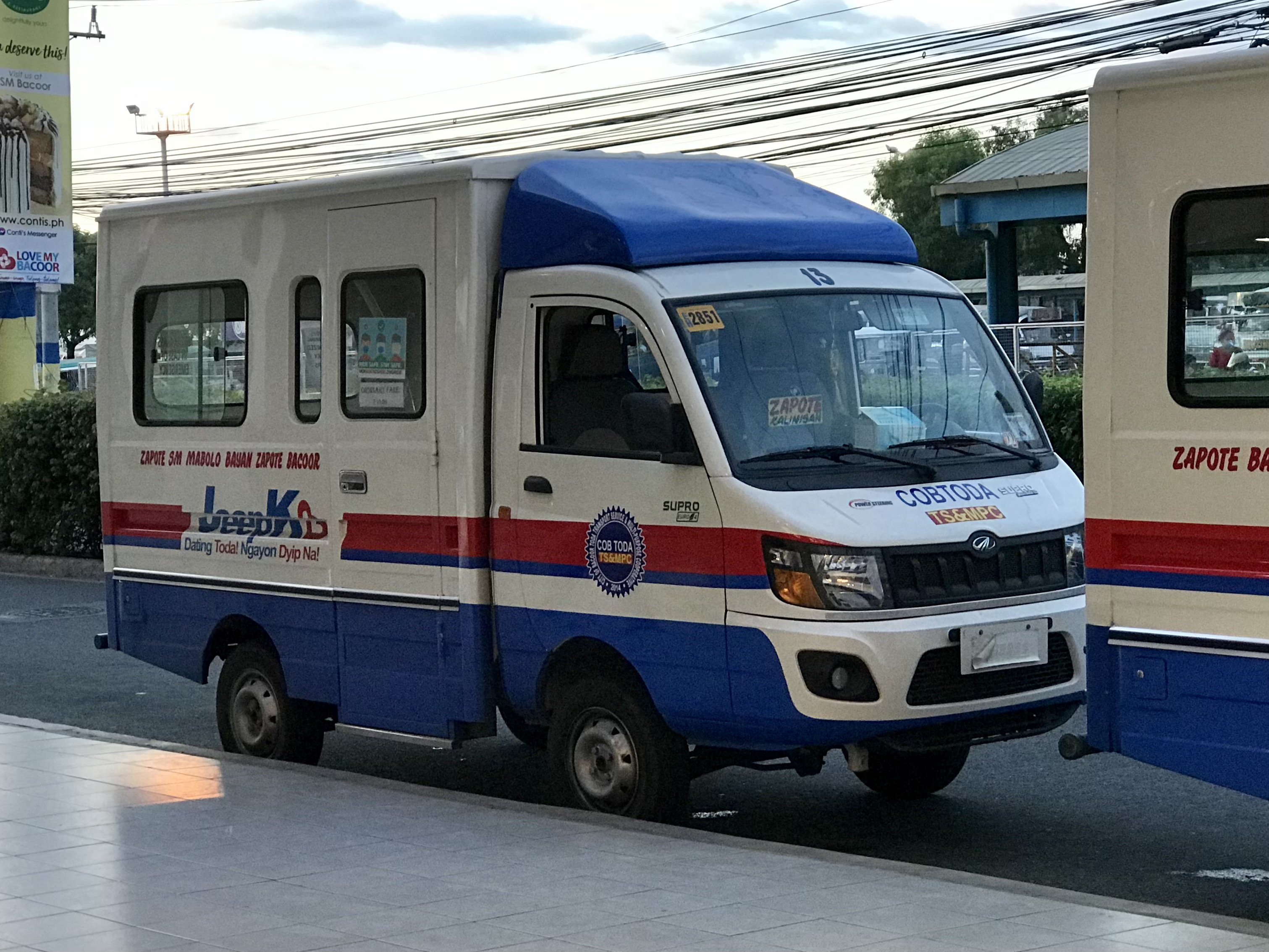
A Modern Mahindra Supro multicab

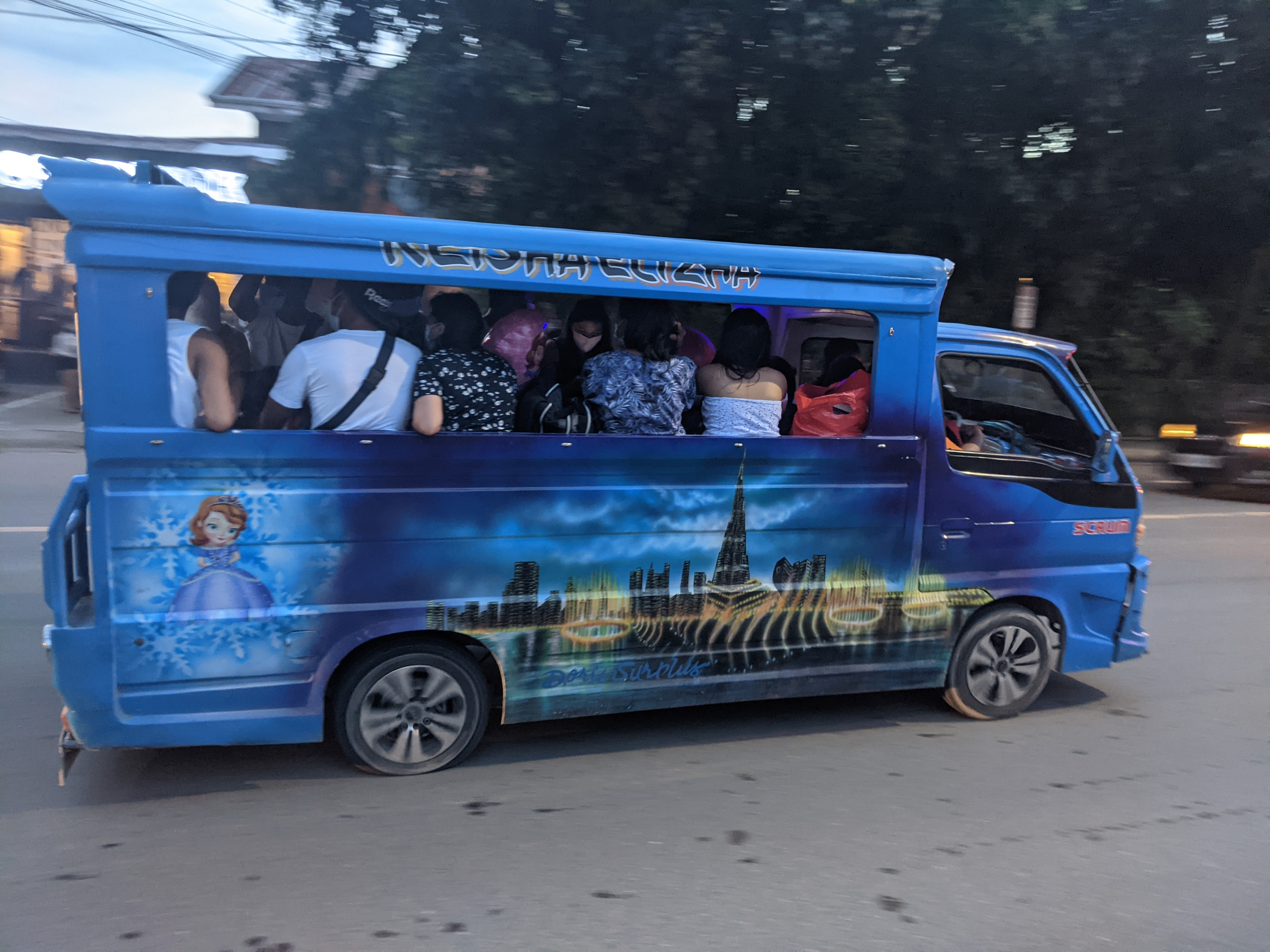
An elaborately decorated multicab in Cebu, used as a Jeepney

== See also ==
- Jeepney
- MKei truck
- Tricycle
- Transportation in the Philippines
