= Dekotora =

Extravagantly decorated trucks in Japan

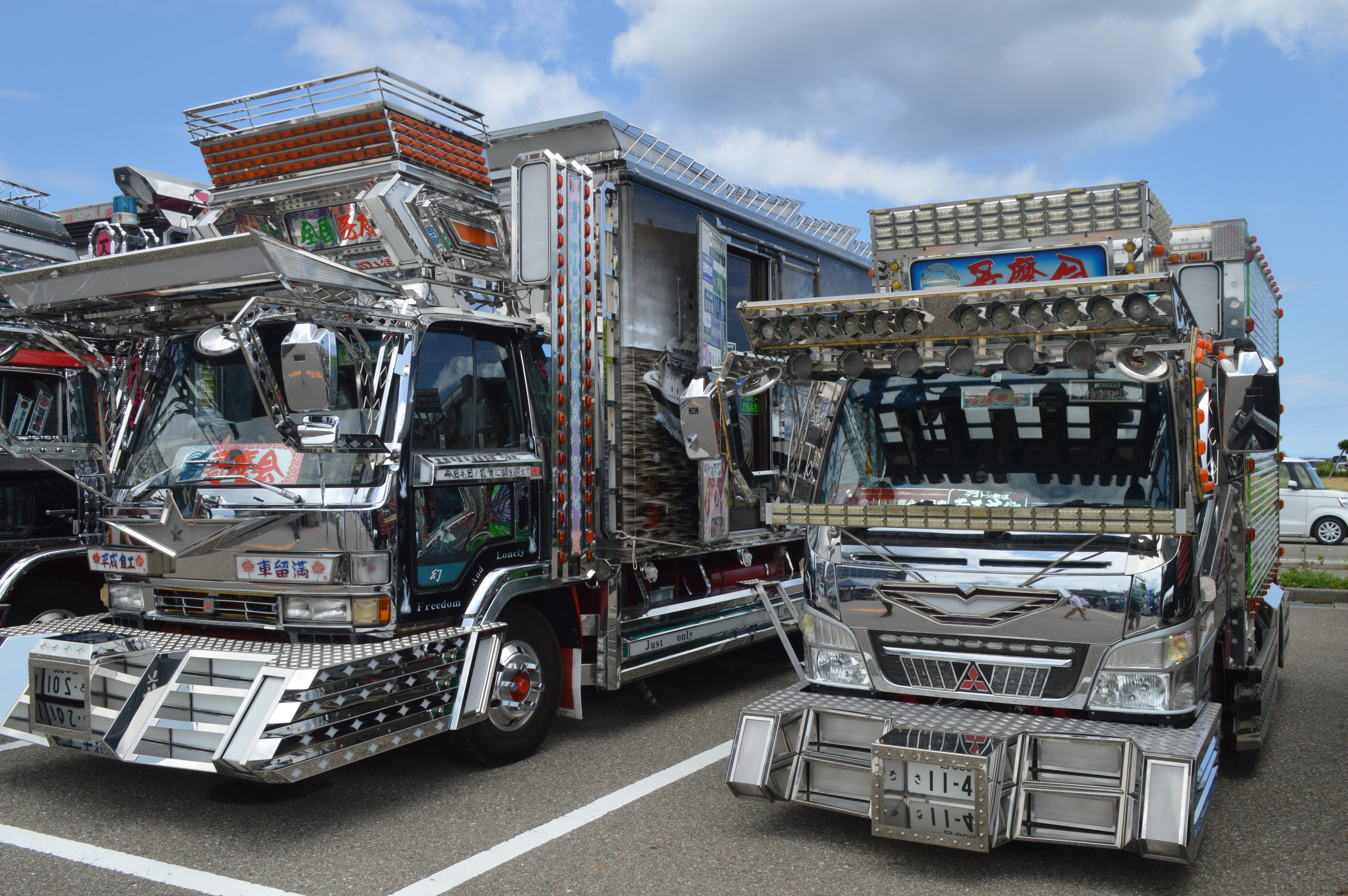
Two Dekotora trucks

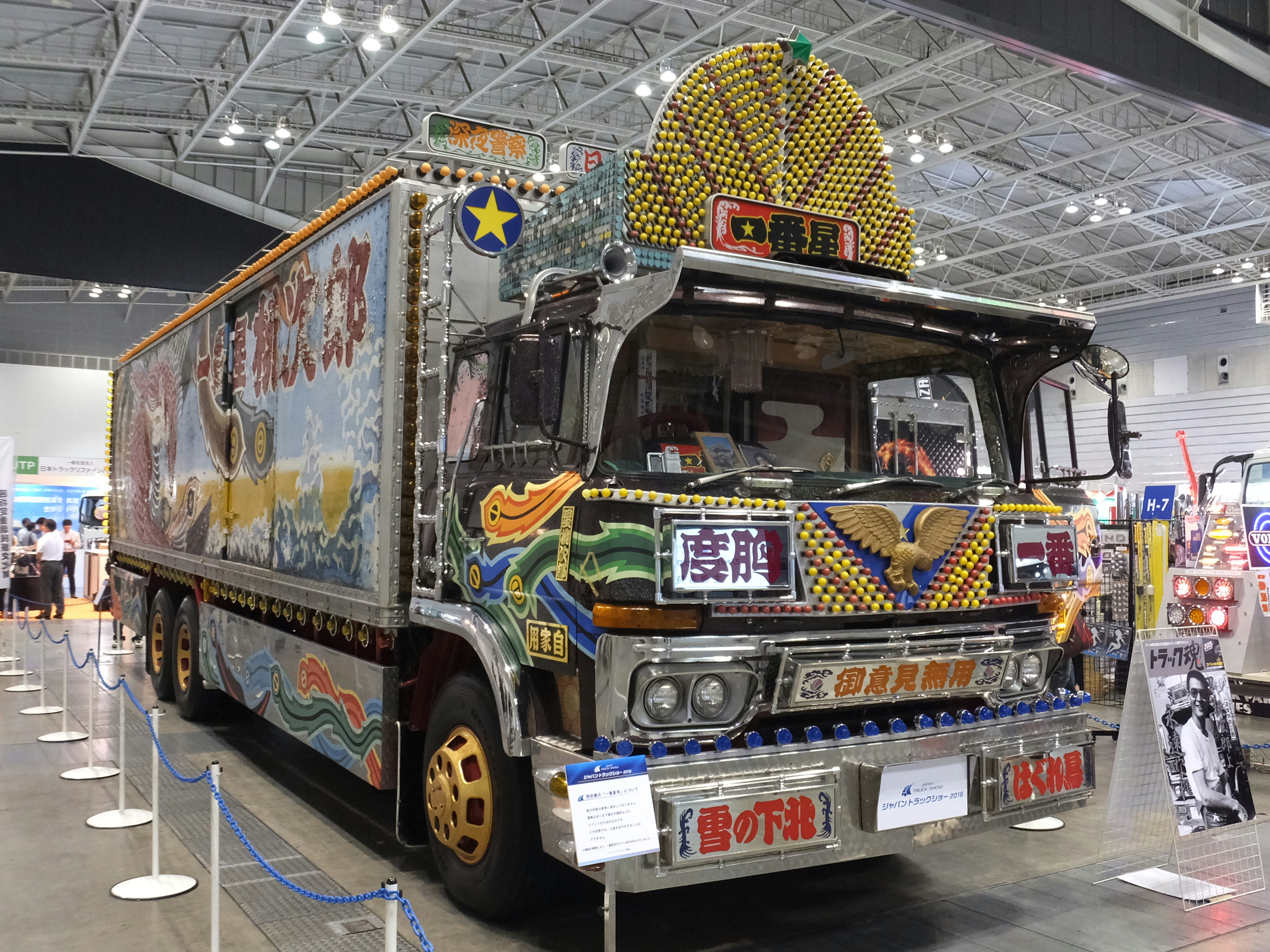
"Ichibanboshi" Mitsubishi Fuso Dekotora which starred in the Torakku Yarō movie series

A decotora on the side of the road in Tokyo, 2009

Dekotora or decotora (デコトラ, dekotora), an abbreviation for "decoration truck", are a style of decorated trucks in Japan. Commonly featuring neon, LED or ultraviolet lights, detailed paintjobs and murals, and stainless steel or golden parts (both on the exterior and the interior), dekotora may be created by workers out of their work trucks for fun, or they may be designed by hobbyists for special events. They are sometimes also referred to as art trucks (アートトラック), ātotorakku)).

== History ==
In 1975, Toei released the first in a series of 10 movies called Torakku Yarō (Truck Guys). These films featured truckers who drove garishly decorated trucks around Japan. This movie was a hit with both old and young, and the dekotora fad swept the country. While dekotora were present throughout the 1970s, they were restricted to north-eastern fishing transport trucks prior to the movies. In those days, ready-made parts for trucks were not easily available, so these trucks took parts from sightseeing buses or American military vehicles.

== Modern times ==
The art form is associated with Japan's underbelly, as modified vehicles cannot pass the biennial safety inspection known as shaken. Therefore dekotora operators are assumed to use grey-market certificate issuers.

Since the late 1990s, dekotora have been heavily influenced by the art of Gundam. Other decorations are more akin to modern art and retro designs that closely resemble those found in the movie.

Once a prominent symbol of Japan's bubble economy, dekotora trucks have become increasingly rare following the 1990s economic crash. The subculture's decline is attributed to stagnant wages, shifting social attitudes, and stricter road regulations. Today, the movement is in a period of contraction as enthusiasts struggle to maintain the tradition under modern economic and legal constraints.

Despite these pressures, the subculture has gained a new identity through disaster response. This was notably demonstrated during the 2011 Tōhoku earthquake and tsunami, where the trucks' visibility and regional branding served as a focal point for logistics and fundraising. This volunteerism has become a defining characteristic of modern owners; for instance, most recently a convoy of roughly 100 trucks mobilised to support the Noto Peninsula in the wake of the early 2024 earthquake.

== Styles ==
- Kansai-style
- Kantō-style
- Retro-style

== See also ==
- Dekochari, bicycles modelled after dekotora
- Itasha, cars decorated with anime characters
- Jeepneys, trucks originally made from surplus American jeeps from WWII, and later being replaced by installing surplus parts from Japan aftermarket.
- Chiva buses, colourful buses primarily seen in Colombia and Ecuador
- Tap taps, painted Haitian "buses"
- Truck art in South Asia
