= Jeepney =

Type of public utility vehicle in the Philippines

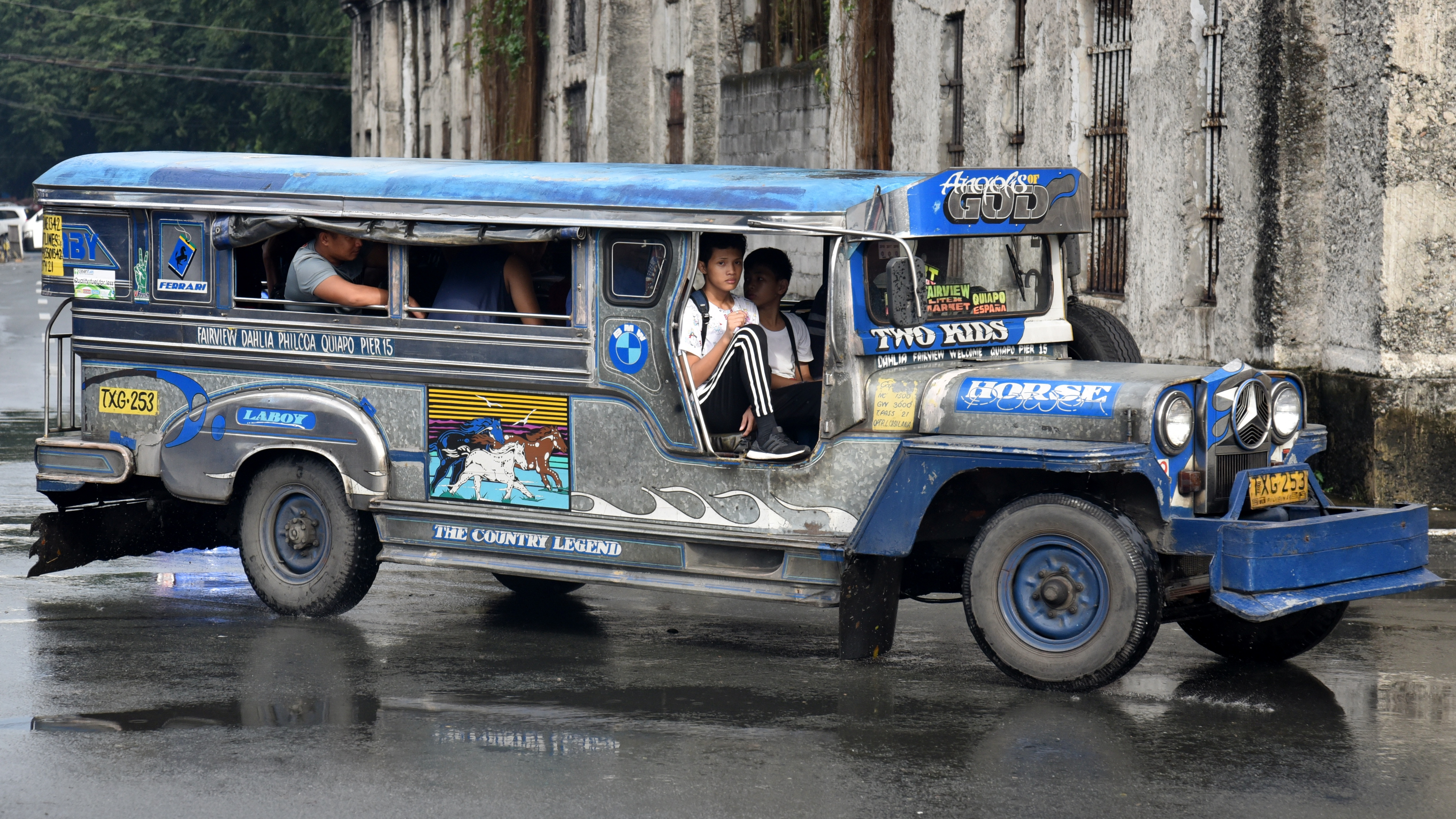
A traditional jeepney in Intramuros

A jeepney (Tagalog: [ˈdʒiːpni]), or simply a jeep (Tagalog: [ˈdʒiːp]), is a type of public utility vehicle (PUV) that serves as the most popular means of public transportation in the Philippines. Known for its crowded seating and kitsch decorations, it is a cultural icon of the Philippines and has its own art, "Jeepney art". At the 1964 New York World's Fair, a Sarao jeepney was exhibited in the Philippine pavilion as a national symbol for Filipinos.

Jeepneys originate from the American colonial period–share taxis known as "auto calesas", commonly shortened to "AC". These evolved to modified imported cars with attached carriages in the 1930s which served as cheap passenger utility vehicles in Manila. These vehicles were mostly destroyed in World War II. The need for replacement transport vehicles led to the use of U.S. military jeeps left over from the war, which became the template for the modern jeepney. A jeepney modernization program launched by the Department of Transportation in 2017 seeks to use more environmentally-friendly vehicles, but has raised concerns regarding the preservation of the jeepney's iconic look as most modern jeepneys resemble regular minibuses.

As of 2022, there were an estimated 600,000 drivers nationwide dependent on driving jeepneys for their livelihood. In Metro Manila, an estimated nine million commuters take the jeepney each day.

== Etymology ==
The word jeepney is a portmanteau of post–World War II "jeep" and pre-war "jitney", both words common slang in the popular vernacular of the era.

== History ==
=== Predecessors ===
From the American colonial period up to the aftermath of World War II, jeepneys and other similar forms of public transport were known as "auto calesa" (or "AC" for short), named after the horse-drawn calesas of Manila, or simply "jitney" or "baby bus." The term "auto calesa" was first attested in 1910, and originally referred to relatively cheap imported cars that were used as share taxis by local drivers for ₱2 (equivalent to ₱1,099 in 2021) an hour. The first automobile to be modified for seating more passengers was introduced in 1932 by a Filipino entrepreneur, using cheap imported German DKW vehicles with side-entry carriages attached. These were operated by the DKW-AC Company.

By the mid-1930s, Emil Bachrach, a Russian American entrepreneur in the Philippines (who also owned the Ford Motor Co. franchise in the Philippines, as well as Manila's first bus company), started the Bachrach Motor Company (BMC). They began manufacturing similar vehicles known as the BMC-AC. Unlike the DKW-ACs, they had a back-entry carriage style (similar to the carretela-type calesa) that was joined seamlessly with the chassis. It seated two people on each side. The automobiles used were cheap imported British Austin 7s and later on, American Bantams, both of which are the direct precursors of the Jeep. They later expanded to seat eight to ten people but were still much shorter than modern jeepneys. Most of these vehicles were destroyed in World War II.

=== Early examples ===
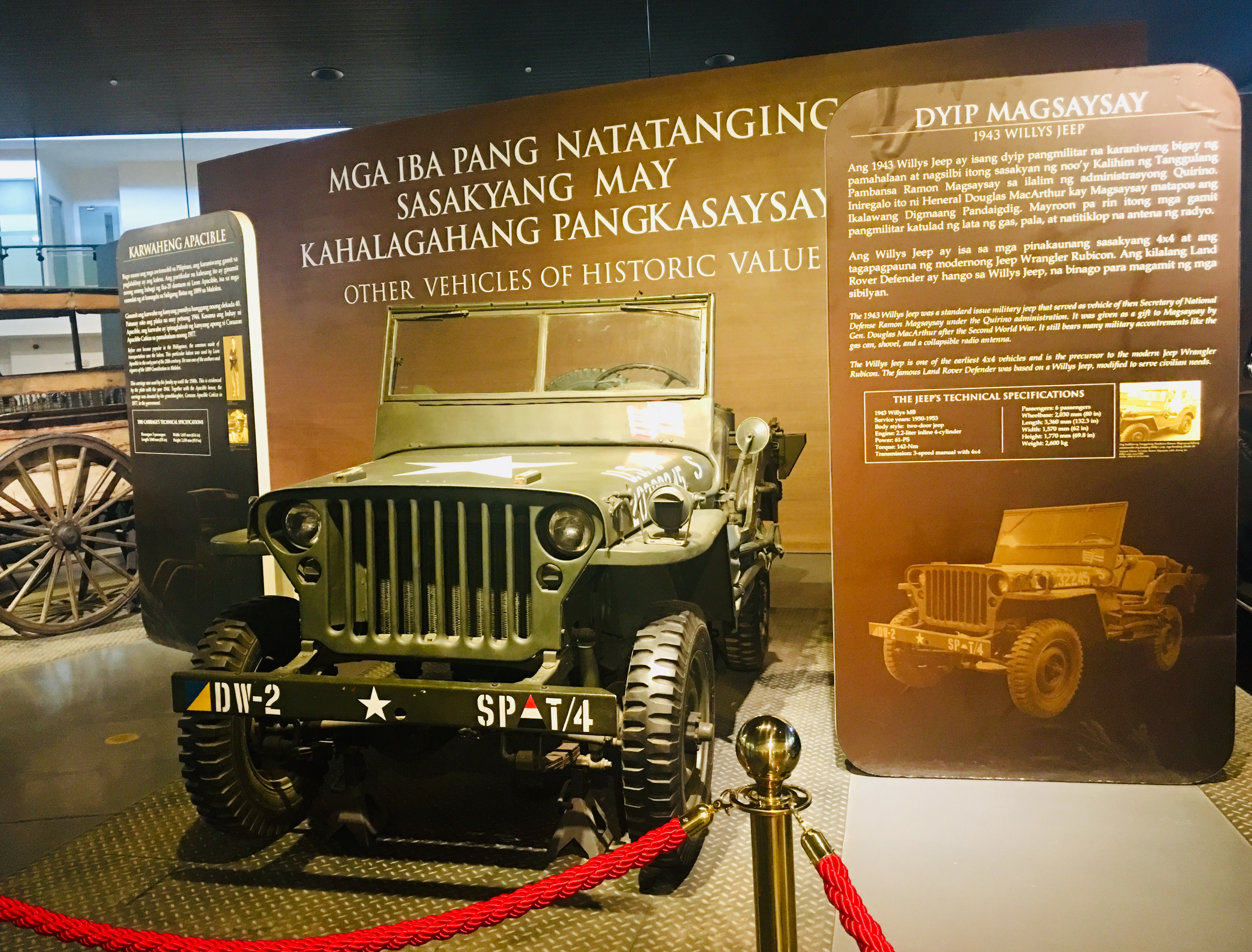
A 1943 Willys MB, the basis for the design of jeepneys. This example was given as a gift to then Secretary of National Defense Ramon Magsaysay from Douglas MacArthur after World War II.

The first true jeepneys were based on Willys MBs, colloquially referred to as "Jeeps". At the end of World War II, hundreds of surplus Jeeps previously used by American military personnel who were leaving the Philippines were sold or given to Filipino citizens. Harry Stonehill, an American soldier turned businessman whose business empire would later become the focus of the infamous Stonehill bribery scandal, was involved in the disposal of military surplus after the war and reportedly created a black market for jeeps.

The Jeeps were stripped down and altered locally: metal roofs were added for shade, and the vehicles were decorated in vibrant colours with chrome-plated ornaments on the sides and hood. The back part was reconfigured with two long parallel benches with passengers facing each other to accommodate more passengers. (Note: In addition, when all seating capacity is used (perhaps 10 or 11 passengers on each side), up to three small wooden stools, euphemistically called 'extensions', are placed along the centre-line, with two passengers on each, sitting back to back.) The size, length, and passenger capacity have increased as it evolved through the years. The original jeepneys were refurbished military Jeeps by Willys and Ford, while modern jeepneys are now produced with engines and other parts from Japan or South Korea.

The jeepney rapidly emerged as a popular and creative way to re-establish inexpensive public transportation, much of which had been destroyed during World War II. Recognizing the widespread use of these vehicles, the Philippine government began to regulate their use. By the 2000s, drivers were required to have special driver's licenses, routes were regulated, and fixed fares were implemented. Illegal (unfranchised) operators are referred to as "colorum" operations.

=== Contemporary history ===
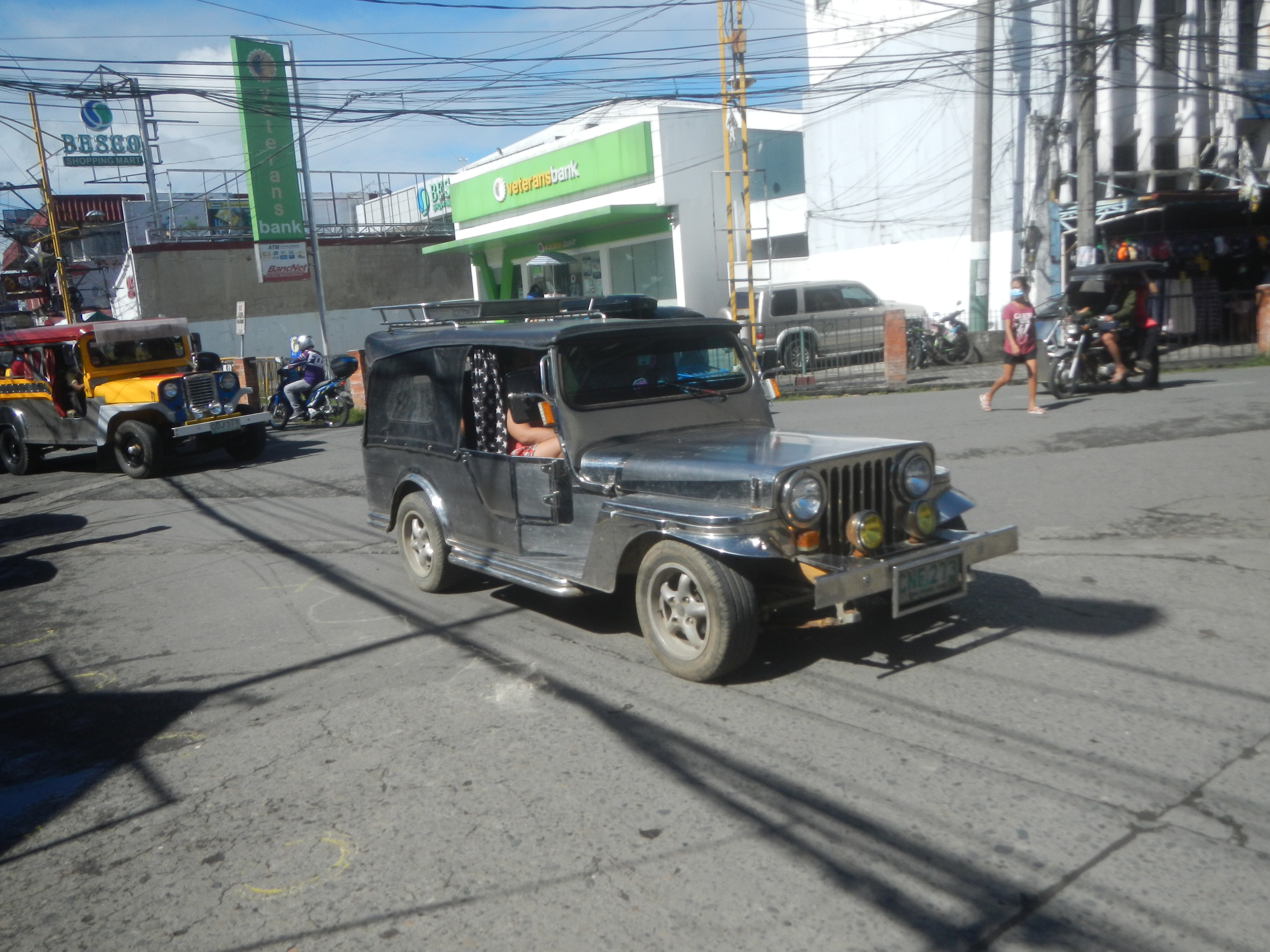
An "owner"-type jeep

Most present-day jeepneys are assembly-built units manufactured within the Philippines by companies like Sarao Motors and Francisco Motors rather than conversions of pre-existing vehicles, although they still resemble the original Willys MB-based examples. These high-capacity jeepneys can carry up to eighteen passengers (including two up front) and were the first versions to be referred to as "Public Utility Jeepneys" (PUJ) or "passenger-type" jeeps. The non-extended, original-seat configuration jeeps were labeled "owners", short for "owner-type" jeeps, and are used non-commercially. The term "owner" is used to distinguish these privately-owned jeeps from those used as public transportation.

Jeepneys were reportedly exported to Papua New Guinea to replace buses and vans that are too costly to import. 4,000 jeepneys were exported to Papua New Guinea in 2004 with considerations to export them to Guam, India and Vietnam.

Since the 2000s, the jeepney industry has been facing threats to its sustainability. Most of the larger builders have gone bankrupt or have switched to manufacturing other products while smaller builders went out of business. Jeepney drivers also face increasing livelihood expenses and the rising cost of diesel fuel due to government deregulation of oil prices. A 2017 study published in a Metro Manila newspaper compared the fuel use of a 16-passenger jeepney to a 54-passenger air-conditioned bus and found that the fuel consumption for both was the same, while no data was given for private vehicles.

The planned construction of bus rapid transit (BRT) systems in Manila and Cebu might lead to the removal of jeepneys.

During the COVID-19 pandemic in the Philippines, public buses and jeepneys were subject to strict lockdown measures that affected the livelihoods of those in the transport sector. Jeepney drivers struggled with the effects of lockdowns and other disease containment measures. In 2020, jeepney drivers filed a case with the Supreme Court against the government's COVID-19 policies, which they argue were prejudicial to their livelihood and deprived them of income to provide for their families.

=== Fleet modernization plans ===
In 2016, the Department of Transportation imposed an age limit on jeepneys of 15 years, with older jeepneys starting to be phased out. Many jeepney operators oppose the phase-out, and George San Mateo, leader of the "No to Jeepney Phaseout" Coalition, called the modernization program "corrupt". Leyte Representative Martin Romualdez urged the Land Transportation Franchising and Regulatory Board (LTFRB) to drop its jeepney modernization program. As part of the PUV modernization program all new and existing vehicles must be fitted with a tap card system which allows commuters to pay for their trip. After multiple failed attempts at implementation and crippling technical issues surrounding the existing Beep Card many of the proposed systems were rejected by the Department of Transportation (DOTr). Additionally, all Jeepney Drivers and Operators are urged to form or become a member of a Transport Cooperative or consolidated franchise as part of the modernization program.

== Design ==
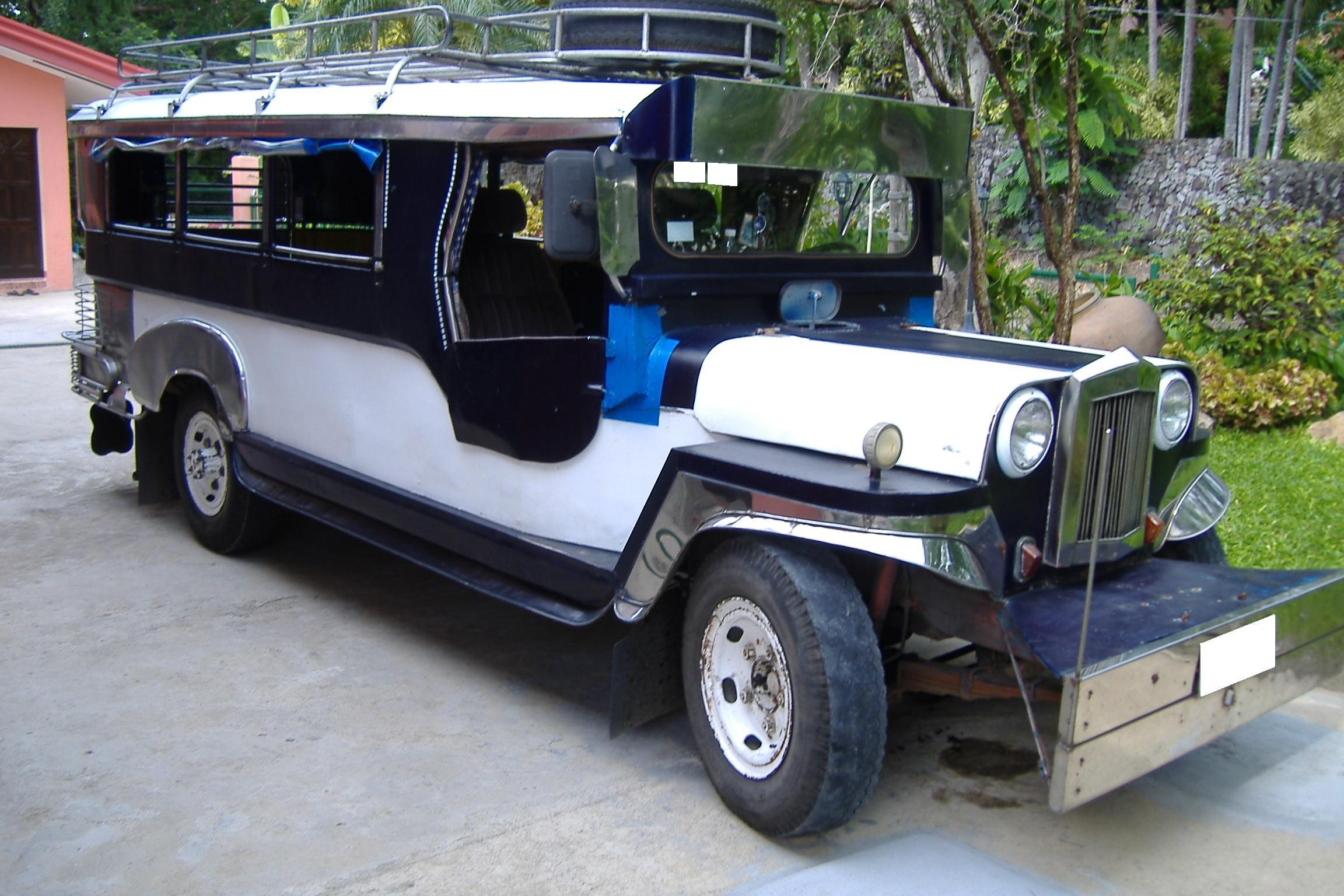
A jeepney ready for decoration

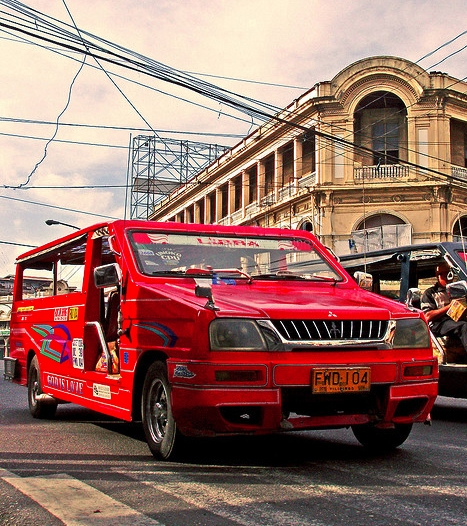
A facelift of Mitsubishi L200 passad jeepney of Iloilo City

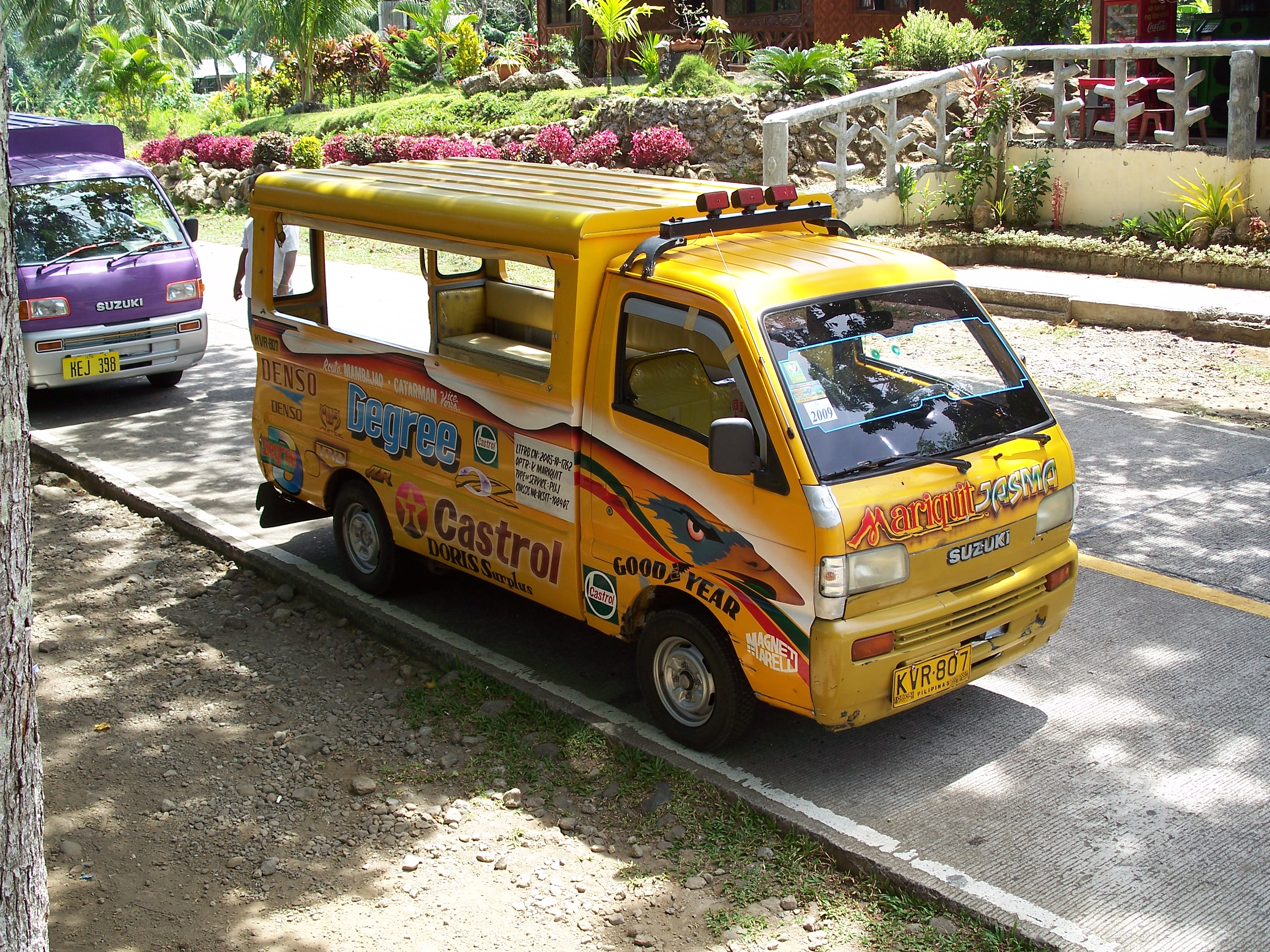
A Kei truck-based derivative jeepney called multicab

Body designs of jeepneys vary by region. Some are plainly colored, while others can use massive variety. Some jeepneys can be decorated with stickers or spray paint, with designs consisting of caricatures, illustrations, or pictures inspired by popular cultures, such as actors and actresses, cartoons, animes, comics, games, or movie characters, abstract designs and lines, religious icons, and others.

In the central island of Cebu, the bulk of jeepneys are built from second-hand Japanese trucks, originally intended for cargo. These are euphemistically known as "surplus trucks". Popular jeepney manufacturers in Cebu are Chariot and RDAK, known for its "flat-nosed" jeepneys made from surplus Suzuki Carry (also known as multicab) and Isuzu Elf trucks, which are no longer in use in Japan owing to road tax and obsolescence in their country of origin. These are equipped with high-powered sound systems, and racing themes, and are said to be bigger and taller than those in Manila.

In Bulacan, particularly in the city of Malolos, shorter jeeps called "Karatig" are used for short-distance, inter-city transportation. The size varies, with approximately 3 meters (9.8 ft) of passenger space which is longer and can seat at least twice as many passengers as private-use jeeps. The "Karatigs" are less fuel-efficient as compared to the more standard-size public utility jeeps that are common in the rest of the country. Despite their size, it has become important, contributing to the culture and experience of Bulacan public transportation.

Nelson-type jeepneys are manufactured in Davao City and are known there as "uso-uso". The designs of these jeepneys are very different from the traditional style. These jeepneys feature modern front grille and body designs, lowered ride height, and industrial-quality paint jobs. Newer models of Nelson-type jeepneys feature chrome wheels, equipped with radial tubeless tires. They are almost always equipped with a powerful stereo system, so they are often referred to as "mobile discos."

Many manufacturers are moving to build modern-looking jeepneys such as Hummer and Jeep Wrangler Rubicon lookalikes and oversized van-style passenger jeepneys with headlights, hoods, bumpers and other components salvaged from AUVs and sport utility vehicles like the Honda CR-V or the Toyota Tamaraw. In Iloilo City, jeepneys called passad are known for bearing a resemblance to sedans or pickup trucks, with the front fascia taken off an existing SUV or AUV. The vehicle's body has a much lower profile which resembles more of a sedan chassis with an elongated body.

In the Cordillera Administrative Region, especially in Baguio City and Benguet province, they have jeeps fitted with truck wheels, or jeeps based on a heavy truck platform, frame, and engine. The same goes for other parts of the Philippines with unpaved roads.

The launching of the jeepney modernization program raised concerns that the jeepney's iconic look would be erased by other designs that would make them look like buses. In response, the LTFRB reassured the public that modern jeepneys can retain their traditional look. Several lawmakers have pushed to retain the jeepney's iconic design in modern jeepneys.

=== 2nd-generation jeepneys ===
Fully assembled with refurbished engines, some also have air-conditioning units, which are popular in Makati. Most of these jeepneys have radically expanded passenger capacities, and are often flamboyant and noisy. Many jeepneys from this generation run on diesel fuel, though very rarely with gasoline and liquefied petroleum gas (LPG).

Passenger jeepneys from this generation and beyond may employ tailgates especially if they traverse expressways. These are usually rigged mechanically to be controlled from the driver's side in lieu of electronic locking systems.

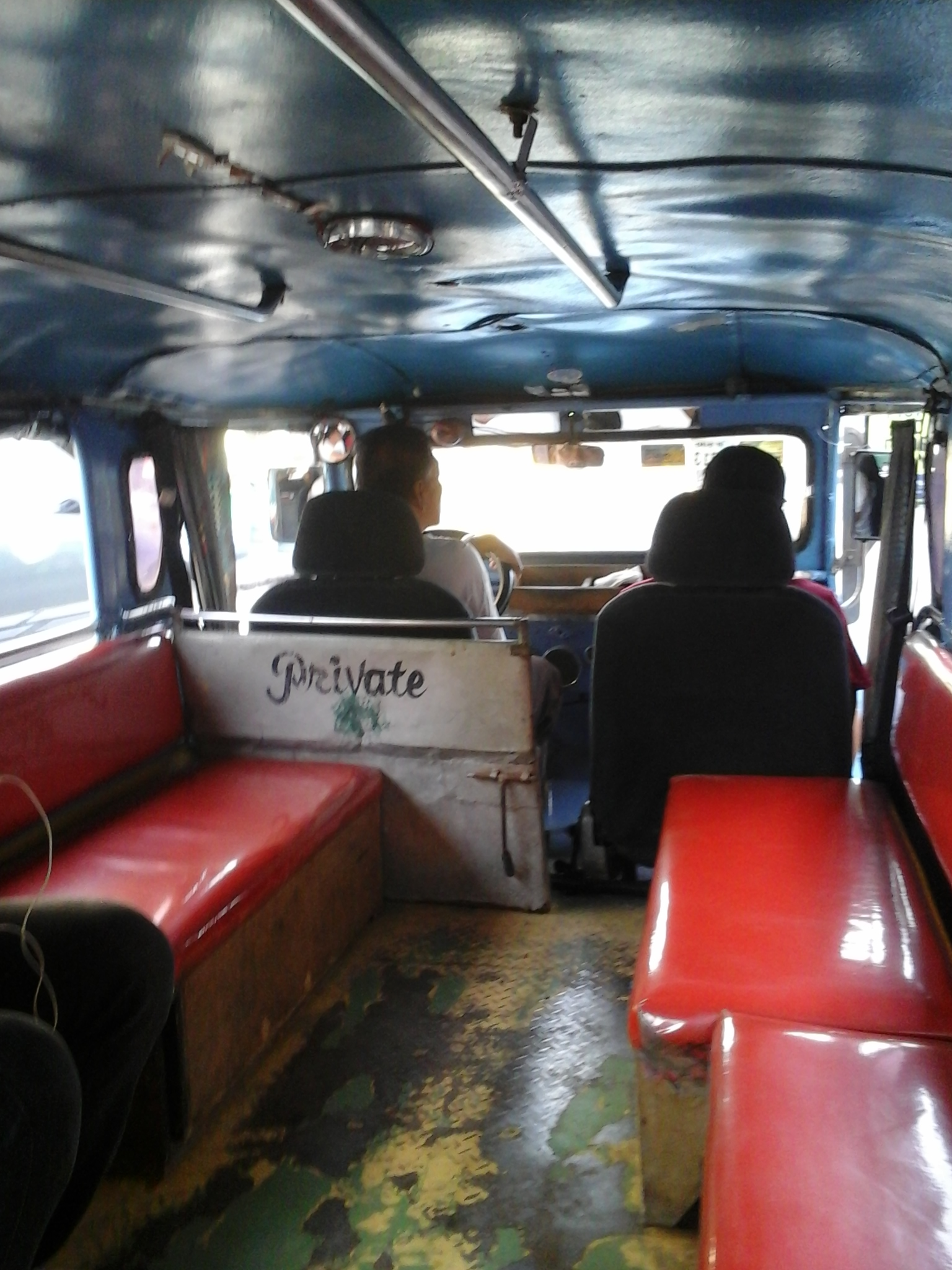
The interior of a second-generation jeepney

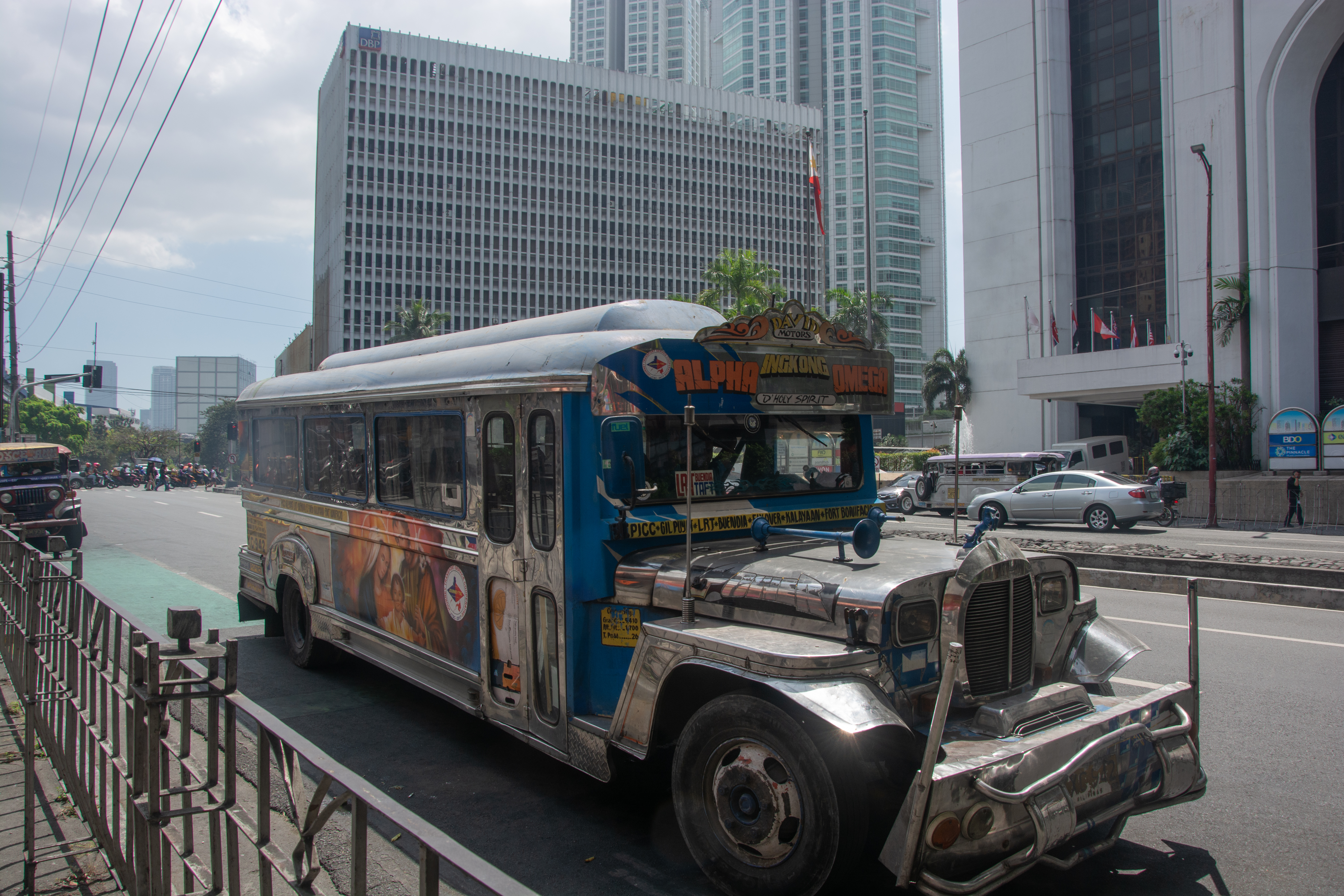
An air-conditioned jeepney in Makati

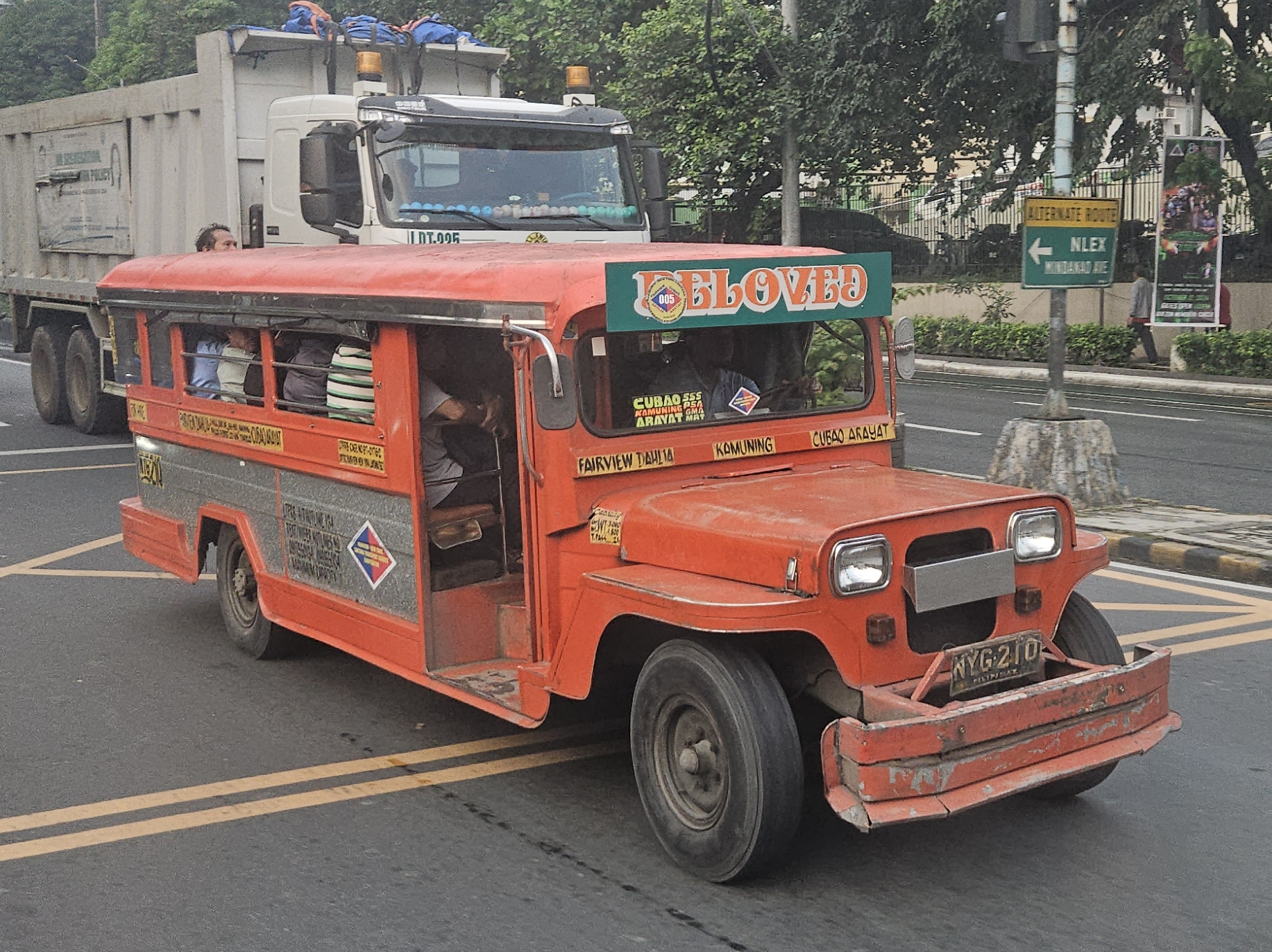
A jeepney with a side door in Quezon City

=== 3rd-generation jeepneys ===
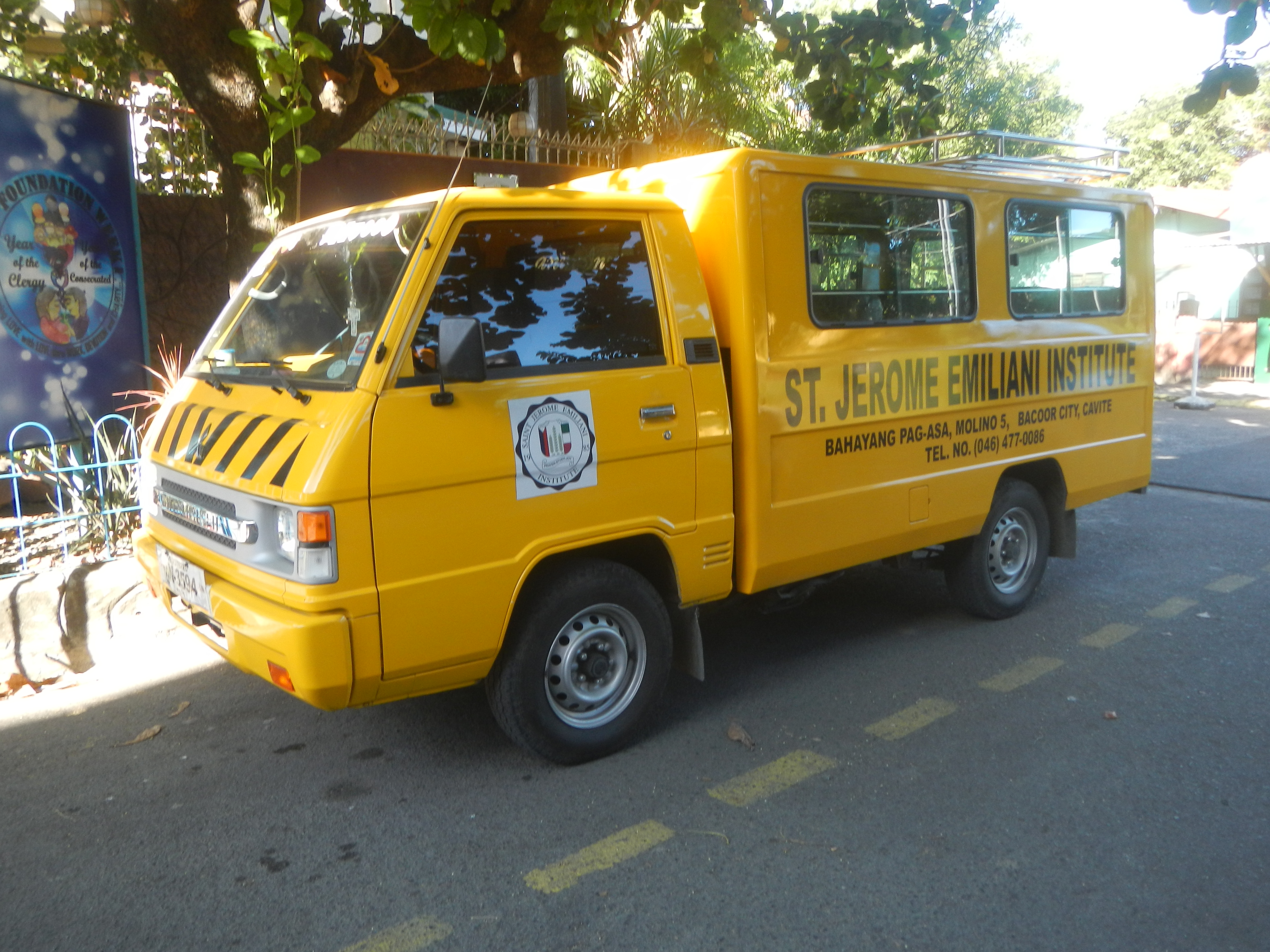
The Mitsubishi L300 has been a popular choice among entrepreneurs.

Two kinds of 3rd-generation jeepneys have surfaced over the years: Modernized jeepneys and truck-and-van-based jeepneys.

Modernized jeepneys are manufactured using new engine components and are built with air-conditioning, particularly with recent Euro 4 engine standards imposed in the country. Though some keep the traditional body of the contemporary jeepney, many of these closely resemble a minibus. Their doors may be situated at the side, or at the front, with doors functioning like that of an actual bus.

Cab/chassis variants of jeepneys are based on pick-up trucks and van platforms wherein local coachbuilders assemble rear bodies for passenger and cargo hauling purposes. Their doors are situated at the back as a tailgate and usually have parallel bench seats that can be lifted for more cargo space and air conditioning that may be standard or optional to some car manufacturers. These kind of vehicles are referred to as FB-type vans.

Early examples of the modern type of jeepney include the Toyota Tamaraw, Ford Fiera, and the Mitsubishi Cimmaron (Which predates the Tamaraw and Fiera by a whole decade, introduced as far back as 1961) which had parallel benches offered standard by their respective manufacturers. They were introduced back in the 1970s and were an alternative to the aging jeepney. Modern examples include the pick-up based Toyota Hilux, ISUZU IPV and Mitsubishi L200 to the van-based Hyundai H100, Mitsubishi L300, Kia K-2500 Karga, Isuzu Traviz and even truck-based Mitsubishi Fuso Canter, Hino Dutro and Isuzu N-Series to name a few.

Although they are often seen as commercial van rather than actual jeepneys, they are popularly used as school buses, delivery vehicles, and other modes of public transportation, mainly UV Express, though used sparingly in comparison to actual commercial vans such as the Toyota HiAce or the Nissan Urvan.

=== Modern jeepneys ===
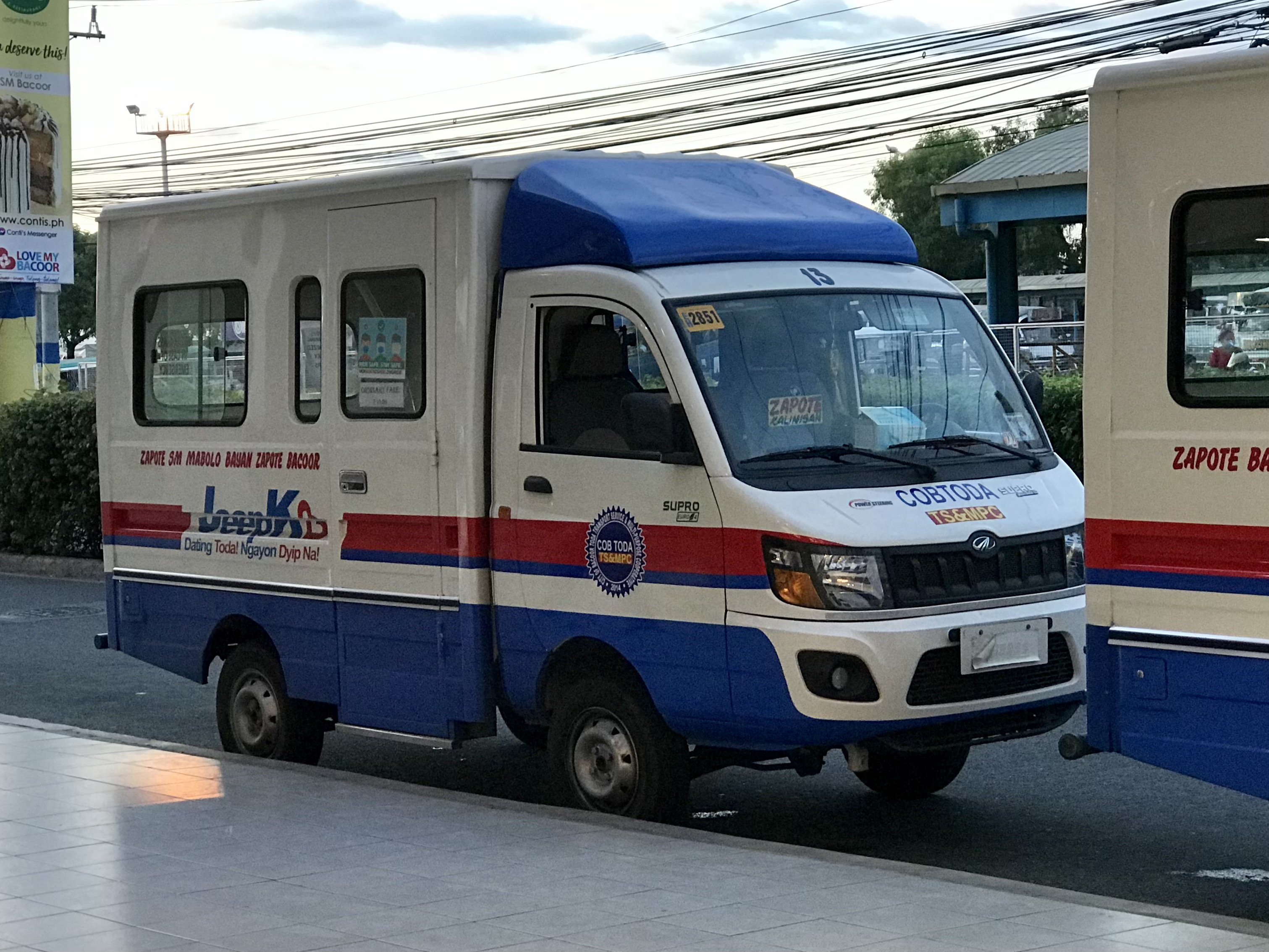
A Mahindra Supro Class 1 jeepney

Modern jeepneys are an updated version of the third-generation models, featuring additional regulatory standards. These include standardized seating, increased vehicle height, CCTV, fare collection systems (both traditional and Beep), speed limiters, GPS, and Wi-Fi. Typically, brand-new jeepneys of this generation are issued to transport cooperatives and are manufactured by major vehicle producers. However, some modern jeepneys are also built by coachbuilders, provided they adhere to the specified standards. Many modern jeepneys resemble truck vans in design and aesthetics, often featuring a hoodless front due to their industrial manufacturing process. This design choice makes them look more like buses than traditional jeepneys.

There are at least 3 classifications categorized by manufacturers, Class 1 is based on vans or microvans chassis cabs. Like 3rd-generation jeepneys, they have rear bodies made by coachbuilders, but the only difference is that they are taller in height and their passenger doors are now situated on the side. Classes 2 and 3 are based on medium-duty trucks (Often converted to a bus) or an actual minibus.

Class 1 and 2 PUVs have their seating configuration facing sidewards while Class 3 are front-facing seat configuration. For truck vans and minibuses, vehicle manufacturers/coachbuilders can sometimes offer both Class 2 and Class 3 configurations on their models.

=== E-jeepneys ===
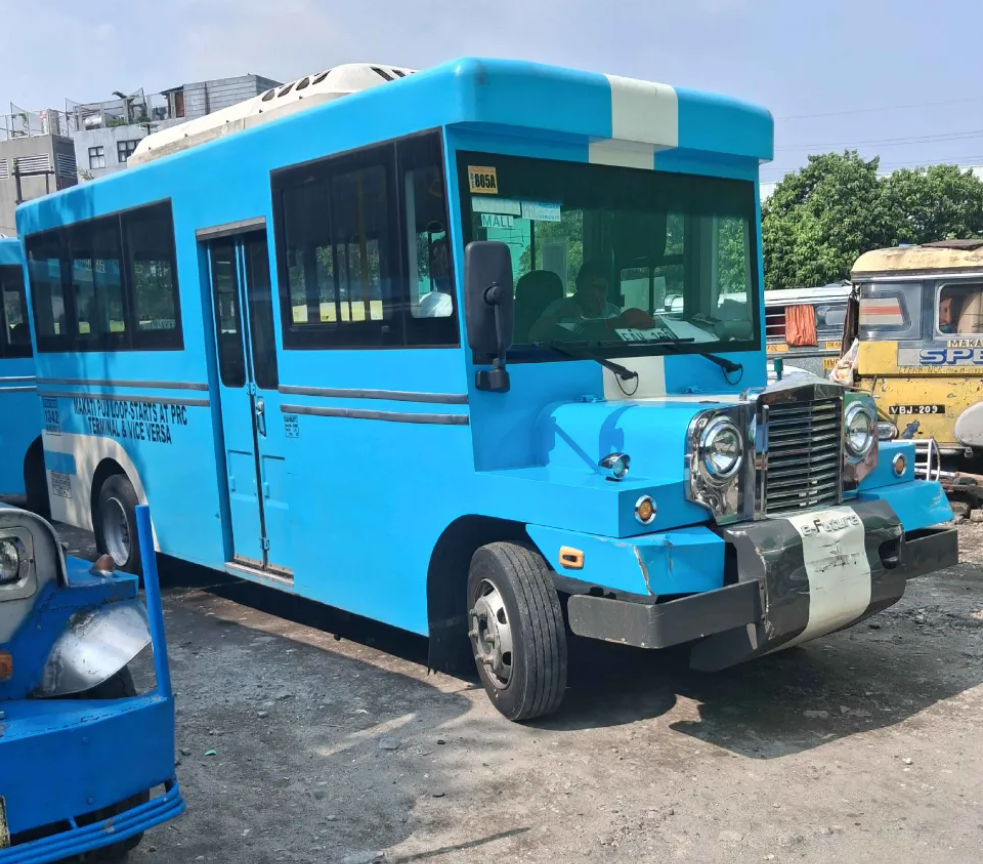
An FC 11 e-jeepney built by E-Future Motors.

Local automobile parts manufacturers are now planning the production of electric jeepneys. Electric jeepneys are now widely deployed in several parts of Metro Manila and in some provinces, either as a staple transportation that completely replaces conventional jeepneys or as a service vehicle. The deployments were in response to calls for reduced greenhouse gas emissions and the fluctuations in oil prices. E-jeepneys have come into the economic question as the average cost per kWh of electricity in the Philippines is unsustainable for owner-operators. However, considering the uncertainty in diesel prices, e-jeepneys seem more economical in the long run compared to diesel-fueled jeepneys.

In early 2023, the Land Transportation Franchising and Regulatory Board assured the public that the modernization program could retain the traditional jeepney's iconic look. Amid the proliferation of air-conditioned minibuses, often called "modern jeepneys", local companies such as Francisco Motor Corp. plan to modernize jeepneys while keeping the jeepney's traditional design intact.

== Advantages and disadvantages ==
A relatively long jeepney in Libmanan, Camarines Sur

The jeepney is the cheapest way to commute in the Philippines. Because of its open rear door design, picking up and dropping off is easy for both passengers and drivers, they can stop anywhere unlike buses. But also because of this convenience, some jeepney drivers are a source of traffic congestion by indiscriminately loading and unloading passengers in the middle of the street, blocking traffic and risking the safety of some passengers. Some drivers engage in practices such as jostling for passengers, blocking other jeepneys to pick up passengers in the middle of the lane, and trip-cutting. Trip-cutting involves not completing the designated route, often dropping off passengers if there are fewer than three remaining, in order to return to the jeepney stand and wait for a new set of passengers, as continuing the route would not be profitable for them.

Some jeepneys have distorted subframes and poor emissions.

In response to the cons of the jeepneys, a modernization program has been launched. Newly manufactured jeepneys, such as e-jeepneys and modernized diesel jeepneys, are required to have at least a Euro 4-compliant engine or an electric engine and must contain safety features like speed limiters, accessibility features like ramps and seatbelts, closed-circuit television cameras, Wi-Fi and USB ports, GPS, and a dashboard camera. Motor manufacturers such as Toyota (and their truck subsidiary Hino), Mitsubishi (and their truck subsidiary Fuso), Isuzu, Hyundai, and even some Chinese truck brands such as Foton presented their own prototypes of the modernized jeepneys.

== Flying LuftCar super-jeepney ==
In 2024, LuftCar signed a Memorandum of understanding with eFrancisco Motor Corporation in the Philippines, to develop, integrate, deploy, brand and market a series of Pinoy flying LuftCar super-jeepney (hydrogen Jeepney van eVTOL built around eFrancisco's vehicle chassis for island hopping).

== In popular culture ==
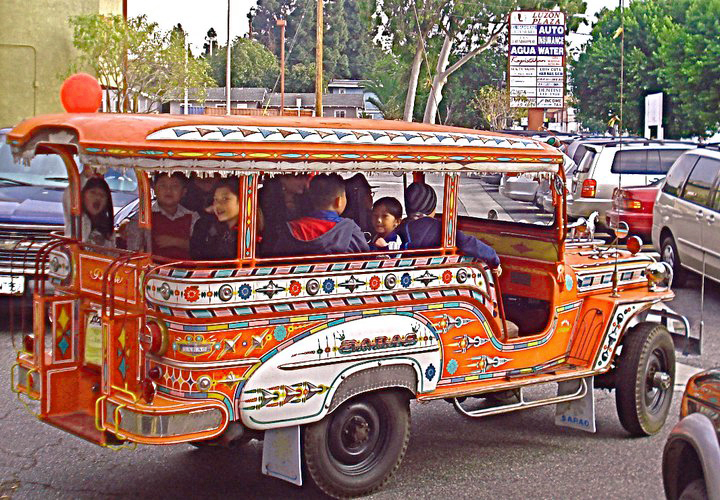
PWC jeepney in Historic Filipinotown, Los Angeles

- When season 5 of the American reality TV show The Amazing Race came to the Philippines in 2004, a segment of jeepney manufacturing was one of the tasks part of the eleventh leg. The episode, which was broadcast the same year, was shot at the Malagueña Motors factory.
- A BBC television program in 2011 called Toughest Place to be a … Bus Driver, a London bus driver goes to Manila and has to experience driving a jeepney around the busy streets of the city.
- In the first season of the Canadian reality TV show Don't Drive Here in 2014, host Andrew Younghusband traveled to Manila with the goal of safely driving a jeepney through Manila as his final day challenge for the trip. After driving nearly 2/3rds of his 15 km route through Manila, he failed the challenge after accidentally switching the ignition off with his knee whilst in an intersection, and having the light turn red as he restarted the engine and proceeded forward (thus running the red light).
- In 2015 during his papal visit in the Philippines, Pope Francis rode a customized jeepney as a popemobile built by ECTK Solutions.
- In honor of the 2019 Asia Challenge being hosted in Manila, Tamiya released a special edition Mini 4WD kit called the "Dyipne".
- In 2020, Hot Wheels released a new casting called the "Road Bandit", which is based on the jeepney.
- In April 2022, Toro Y Moi released his seventh studio album, MAHAL, with the cover featuring a custom-built (working) jeepney in front of the Golden Gate Bridge in San Francisco's Bay Area.
- One of the host city logos for the 2023 FIBA Basketball World Cup, in particular the Manila host city logo, features a jeepney.
- Monty Python member Michael Palin drove a jeepney while in the Philippines for his 1997 BBC series Full Circle with Michael Palin.
- The cable channel Jeepney TV is named after this vehicle.

== See also ==
- Angkot
- Boda boda
- Chiva bus
- Colectivo
- Combination bus
- Customised buses
- Dala dala
- Dollar van/Jitney
- GET COMET
- Kalesa
- Marshrutka
- Matatu
- Midibus
- Motorized tricycle (Philippines)
- Multicab
- Pesero
- Public light bus
- Songthaew
- Tap tap
- Tro tro
- Weyala
- Yipao
