= Tap tap =

Decorated Haitian vehicle

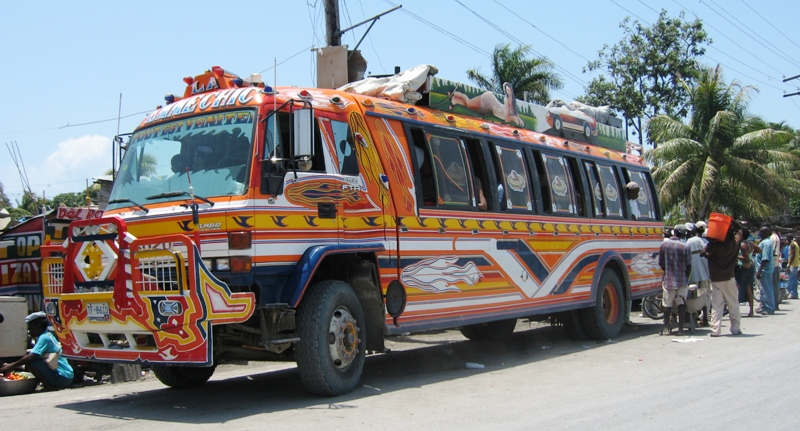
A tap tap bus used for longer journeys

Tap taps (Haitian Creole: Taptap, pronounced [taptap]) are gaily painted buses or pick-up trucks with metal covers that serve as share taxis in Haiti. They may also be referred to as camionettes.

Literally meaning "quick quick", these vehicles for hire are privately owned and ornately decorated. They follow fixed routes, won't leave until filled with passengers, and riders can disembark at any point in the journey.

== Decoration ==
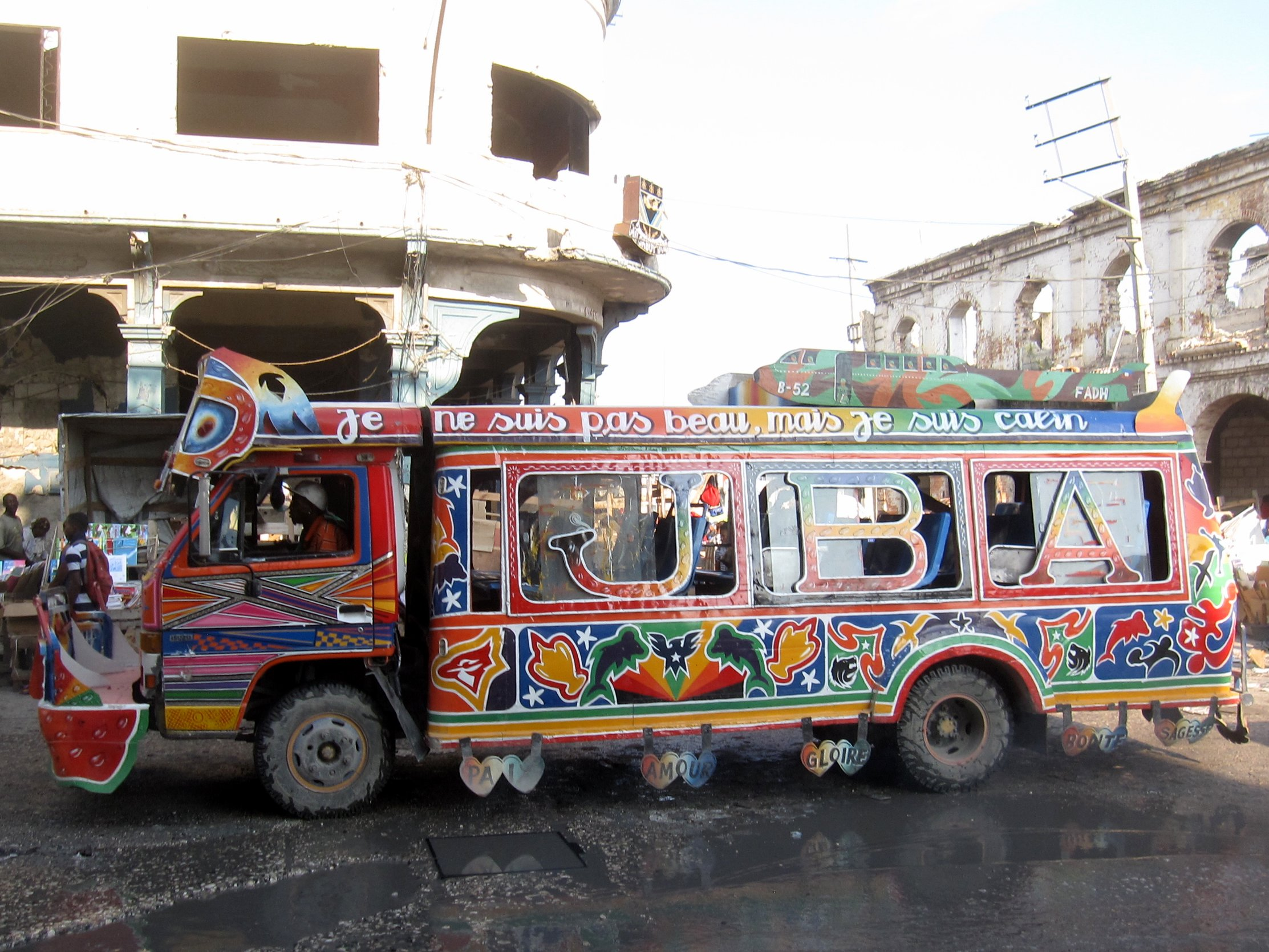
Tap tap in Port-au-Prince.

Often painted with religious names or slogans, the tap tap is known for its lavish decoration, and many feature wild colors, portraits of famous people such as Justin Bieber and Michael Jackson, and intricate, hand-cut wooden window covers. Some window covers are also made of metal.

== Travel warnings ==
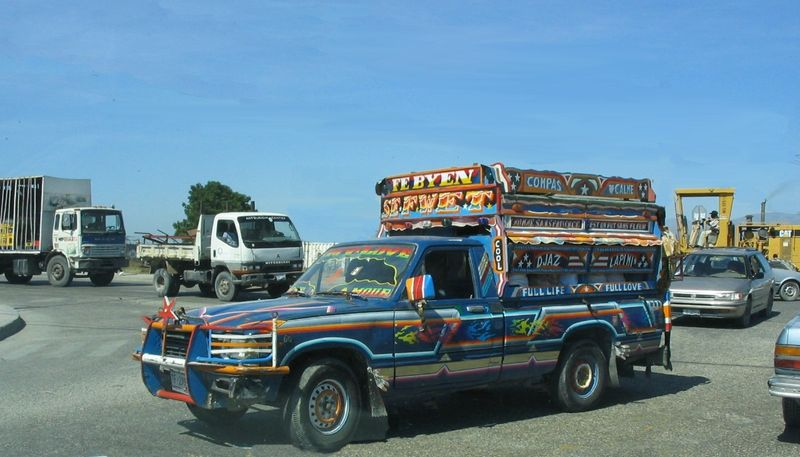
Tap tap cab in Port-au-Prince

Many developed countries inform their citizens to not take tap taps when visiting Haiti.

=== Canada ===
While saying not to use any form of public transport in Haiti, the Foreign Affairs and International Trade Canada advises against tap tap travel especially.

=== United States ===
The US State Department warns travelers not to use tap taps "because they are often overloaded, mechanically noisy, and driven unsafely".

== See also ==
- Dekotora
- Jeepney
- Jingle truck
- Chiva bus
- Auto rickshaw
- Chicken bus
- Matatu
