= Party bus =

Motor vehicle for recreational purposes

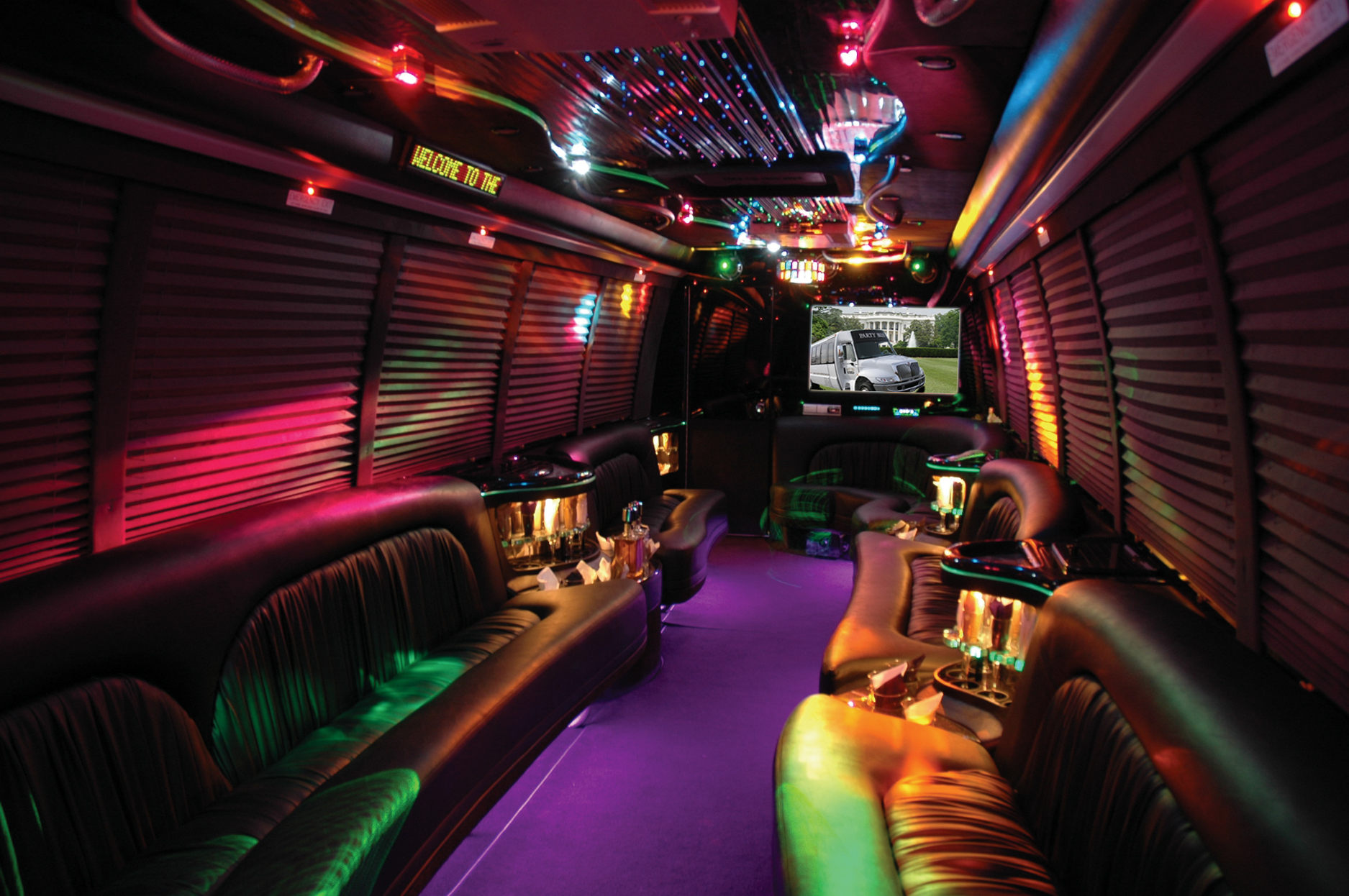
Party bus interior view

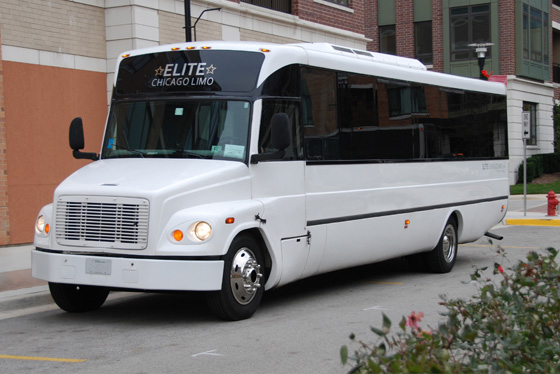
Party bus exterior view

A party bus (also known as a party ride, limo bus, limousine bus, party van, or luxury bus) is a large motor vehicle usually derived from a conventional bus or coach, but modified and designed to carry 10 or more people for recreational purposes. Party buses can often include music systems, on board bars and dancing poles. The basis for interior design of partybuses are usually lighting effects based on modern LED panels and lasers as well as specially designed, comfortable, most often leather chairs and a professional dance floor. The first vehicles of this type appeared in San Francisco and were quickly popularized in the United States and around the world.

South Australia has age limit laws for buses with more than 13 seats allowing party bus operators to only use vehicles up to 25 years old.

== See also ==
- Customised buses
- Limousine
- List of buses
- Vehicle for hire
