= Chiva bus =

Chiva Bus
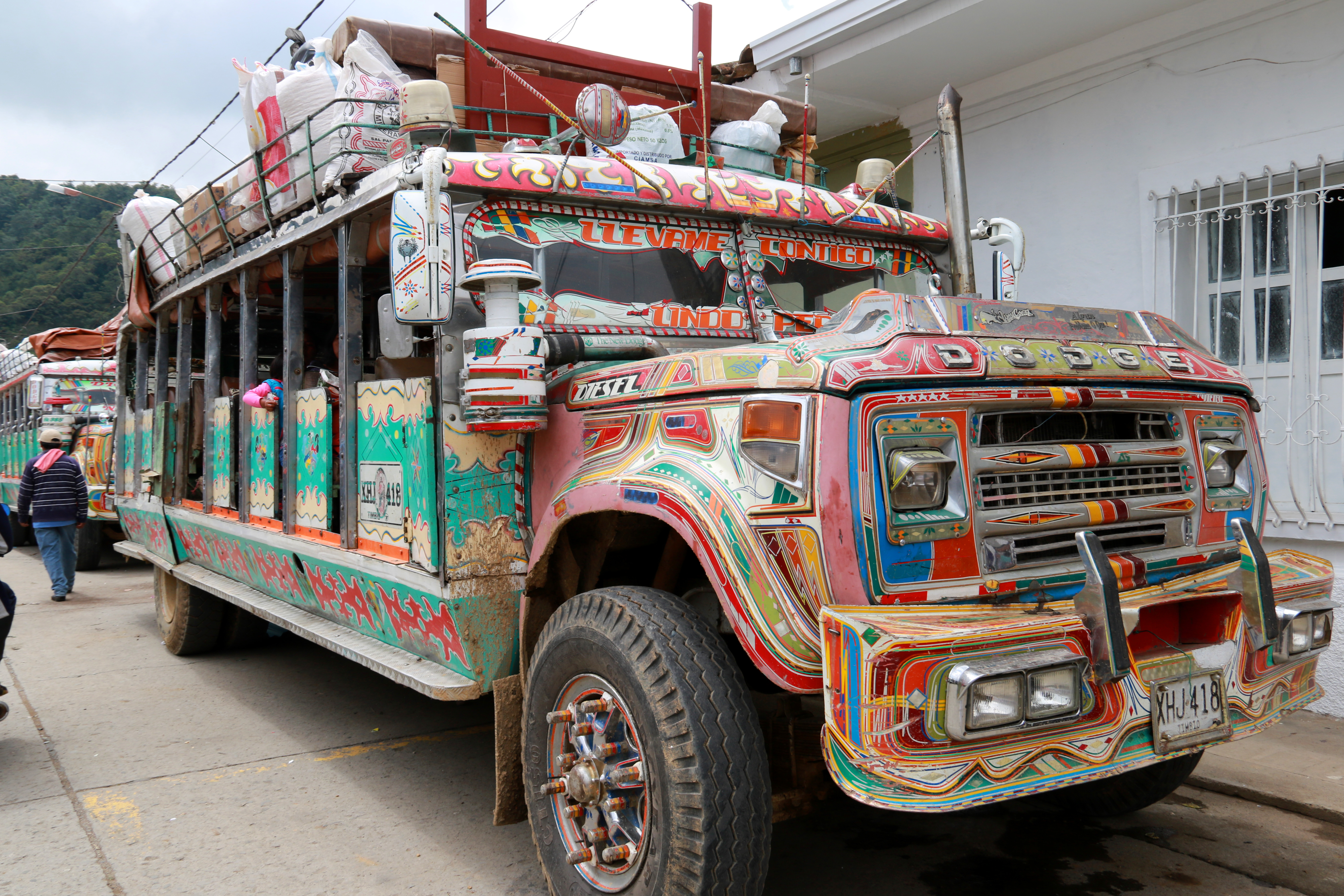

Overview
- Also called: Escalera bus (ladder bus)
- Production: 1922–present
- Designer: Luciano Restrepo, Roberto Tisnes

Body and chassis
- Class: Bus
- Layout: Front-engine, rear-wheel drive layout
- Platform: Blue Bird, Dodge, Ford, among others

Powertrain
- Engine: Diesel
- Transmission: Manual transmission

A chiva (Spanish for goat) or escalera (Spanish for ladder) is an artisan rustic bus used in rural Colombia and Ecuador. Chivas are adapted to rural public transport, especially considering the mountainous geography of the Andean region of these countries.

The buses are varied and characterized by being painted colorfully (usually with the yellow, blue, and red colors of the flags of Colombia, Venezuela and Ecuador) with local arabesques and figures. Most have a ladder to the rack on the roof which is also used for carrying people, livestock and merchandise.

They are built upon a bus chassis with a modified body made out either metal or wood. Seats are benchlike, made out of wood and with doors instead of windows. The owner or driver usually gives the vehicle a unique nickname.

In Panama, the term chiva is used to describe a Toyota Coaster or another similar bus operating in a manner similar to a Chicken bus. Unlike Chicken buses, chivas are often painted white.

== History ==
Parts of a chiva

Chivas were first introduced in the Antioquia Department in the early 20th century. Peasants of the region usually relied on horse-drawn vehicles for the transportation of goods and themselves. In 1908 Colombian engineer Luciano Restrepo and Colombian mechanic Roberto Tisnes imported a chassis from the United States. In Medellín they built the first body. This first bus was used in a route between downtown Medellín to the town of El Poblado. The first models were very basic, with a canvas-made roof and four benches. The body of newer models were modified with a roof rack so peasants could transport their goods.

There is no official account of when this kind of bus first arrived in western Antioquia. In the book Memories of My Land (Memorias de mi tierra), Colombian writer Alirio Diaz tells about the first vehicles ever to arrive in Antioquia through the Las Palmas Road. The most reliable account is found in the book Notes on the History of San Vicente (Apuntes para la Historia de San Vicente) where Colombian author Ricardo Zuluaga Gil narrates the arrival of the first chiva:

There was an event that altered the heyday of Saint Vicentians:The arrival to the town in 1922 of the first engine powered automobile. It was an escalera truck. It was brought from Rionegro by Mr. Lino Arbelaez by riding on the old Royal road for this they needed spades and shovel.

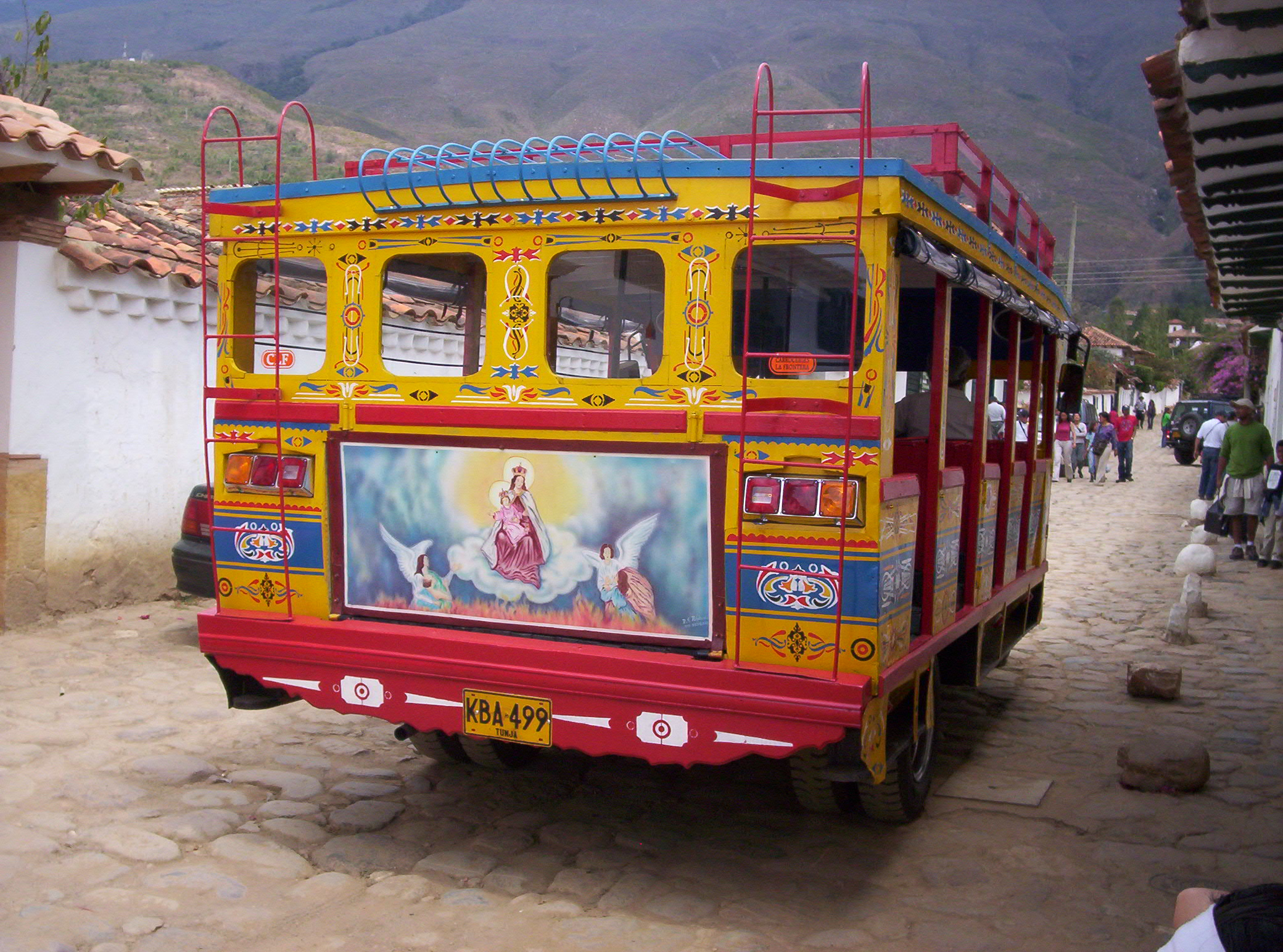
Rear view of a chiva

The term escalera (ladder) was coined because the buses have a ladder, usually located on the rear of the bus. This ladder allows people to put their belongings and goods on top of the bus. The bus became a rural solution to the need of moving both cargo and passengers simultaneously. The most particular and substantial feature of this buses is the combination of wood and metal. However, the aesthetic interpretation given through the years to these buses became the most cultural trademark of rural Colombia in the early 20th century. This aesthetic approach to a tool that became of utmost importance to the peasants developed naturally and some of them have as of today evolved into actual pieces of art.

== Symbol of Colombia ==
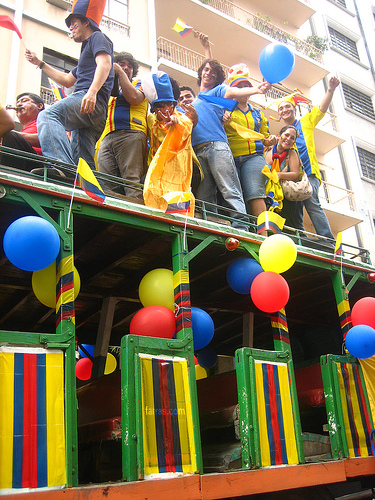
Chiva in action

Chivas are recognized nationally and internationally as a symbol of Colombian culture, in particular of rural Colombia.

== Other locales ==
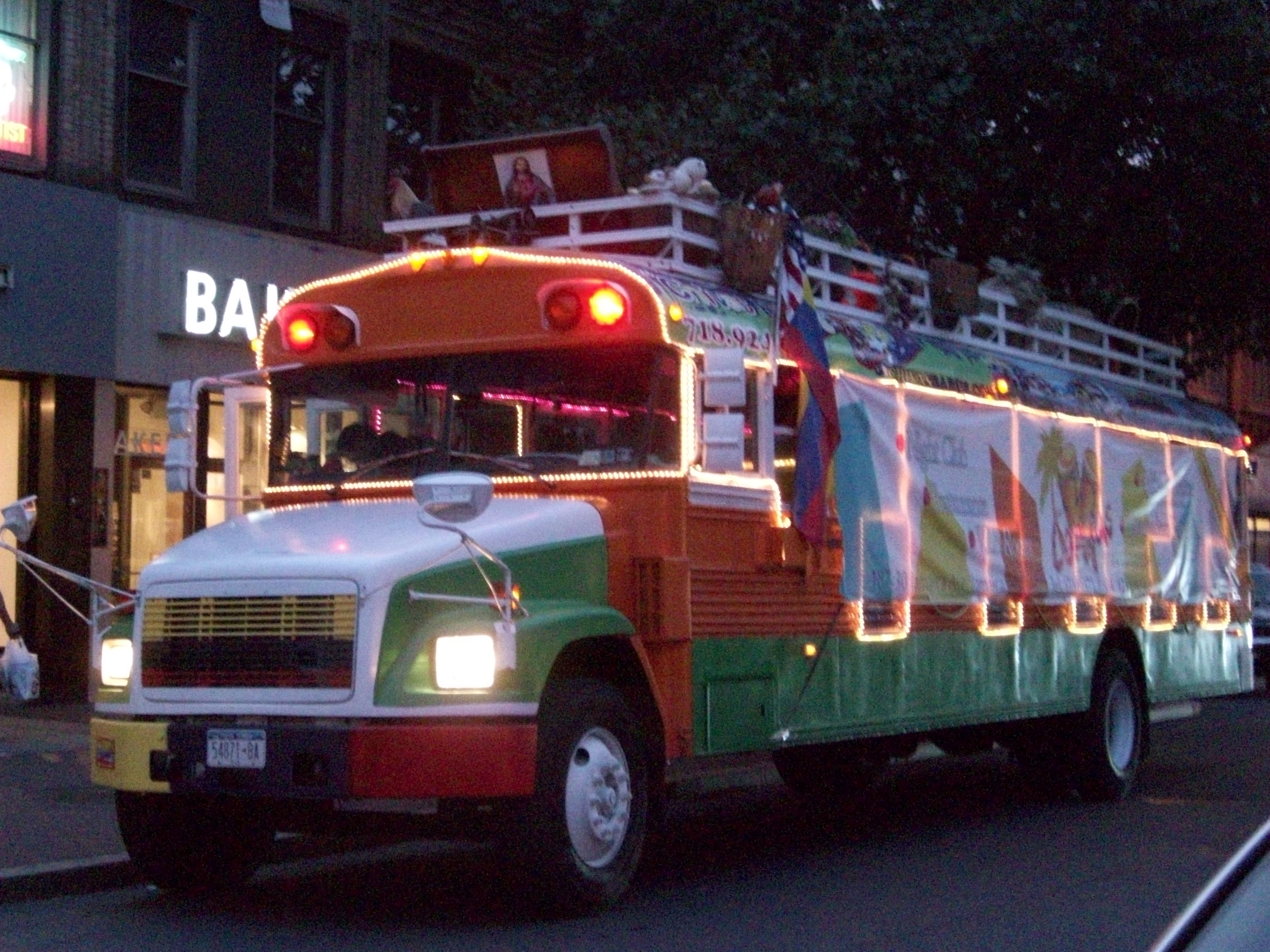
A chiva in New York City

The unique buses be found in South America but also in other locales, including the United States. As the population of Colombian Americans and Ecuadorian Americans has risen in New York City; so has the use of the customized bus. Developed into party buses equipped with their own bar, these can often be found carrying partygoers around the city. Drew Barrymore, Lucy Liu, and Cameron Diaz arrived in a chiva for the New York premiere of Charlie's Angels. The party buses are also used in Panama with the term chiva parrandera.

== See also ==
- Customised buses
- Dekotora
- Jingle truck
- Tap tap
