= Matatu =

Public transportation minibuses in Kenya

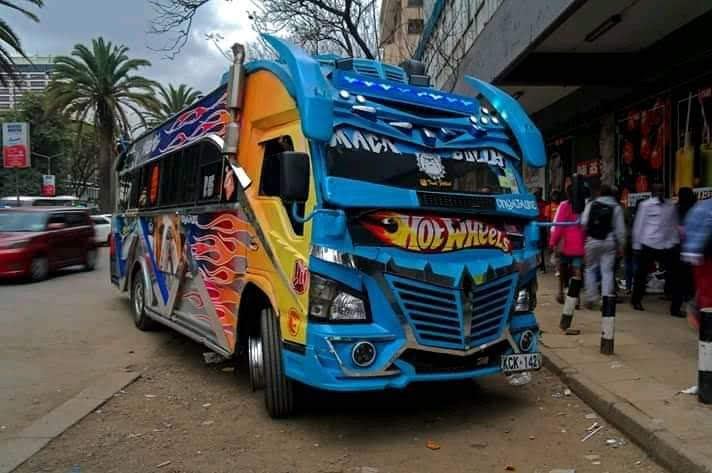
- Matatu minibus in Nairobi

Overview
- Manufacturer: Various
- Production: 1980s-present

Body and chassis
- Class: Minibus

Powertrain
- Capacity: 14-18 passengers (minivan); 25-33 passengers (minibus)

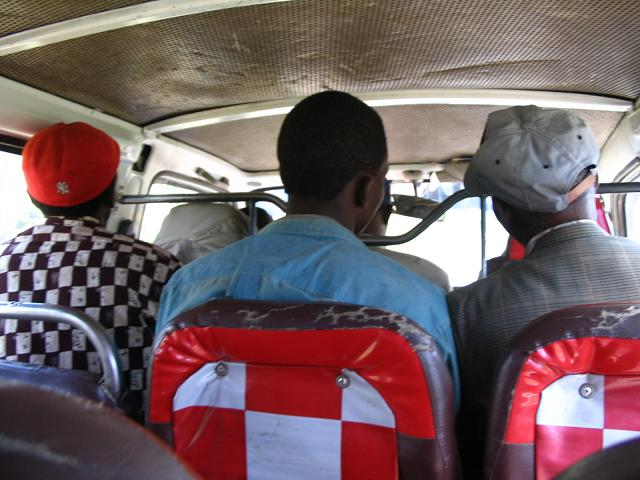
Riding in a Kenyan matatu – minibus size

In Kenya, matatu or matatus (known as mathree in Sheng) are privately owned minibuses used as share taxis. Often decorated, many matatus feature portraits of famous people or slogans and sayings. Likewise, the music they play is also aimed at quickly attracting riders. Over 70% of commuter trips are taken using matatu in cities like Nairobi.

Although their origins can be traced back to the 1960s, matatu saw growth in Kenya in the 1980s and 1990s. The matatu culture sprang up under the influence of widespread hip-hop music and culture by black Americans in the 1980s. By the early 2000s, the archetypal form was a (gaily decorated) Japanese microvan. C. 2015, larger, bus-sized vehicles also started to be used as matatus. The name may also be used in parts of Nigeria. In Kenya, this industry is regulated, and such minibuses must, by law, be fitted with seatbelts and speed governors. Present regulation may not be a sufficient deterrent to prevent small infractions as even decoration may be prohibited. Kenya has one of the "most extensive regulatory controls to market entry", and a matatu worker can be pulled from the streets simply for sporting too loud a shirt.

They may ply set routes, display this route, run from termini, run both inter and intra-city, and may stop along said route to purchase or collect money from passengers. In addition to a driver, a matatu may be staffed by a conductor, locally known as a makanga or manamba or donda. As of 1999, they were the only form of public transport available in Nairobi, Kenya, although in 2006 and 2008 this was no longer the case. Over the years, stiff competition has been experienced from bus-sharing applications such as SWVL.

== Etymology ==
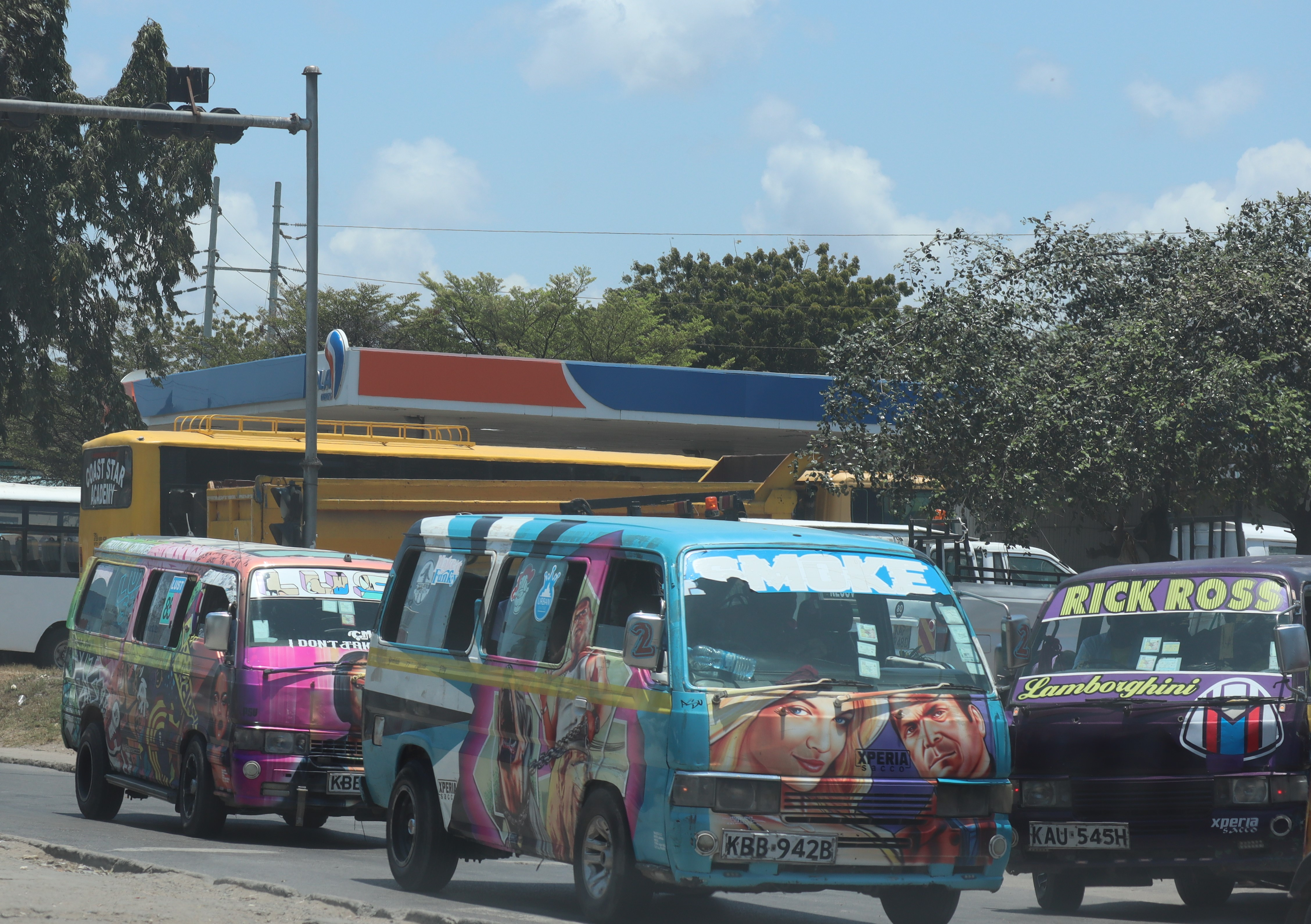
Brightly coloured matatus in Mombasa in 2022

A matatu painted with images of American rapper A$AP Rocky in central Nairobi in 2021

The name derives from a Swahili or Kikuyu colloquialism meaning "three". One explanation is that three 10-cent coins made up the typical 30-cent fare in the 1970s. There is no universally agreed opinion on an origin for the name, however, alternatively, one news source suggests its origin lies in the Kikuyu language, specifically from the Kikuyu phrase 'mang’otore matatu' meaning 30 cents.

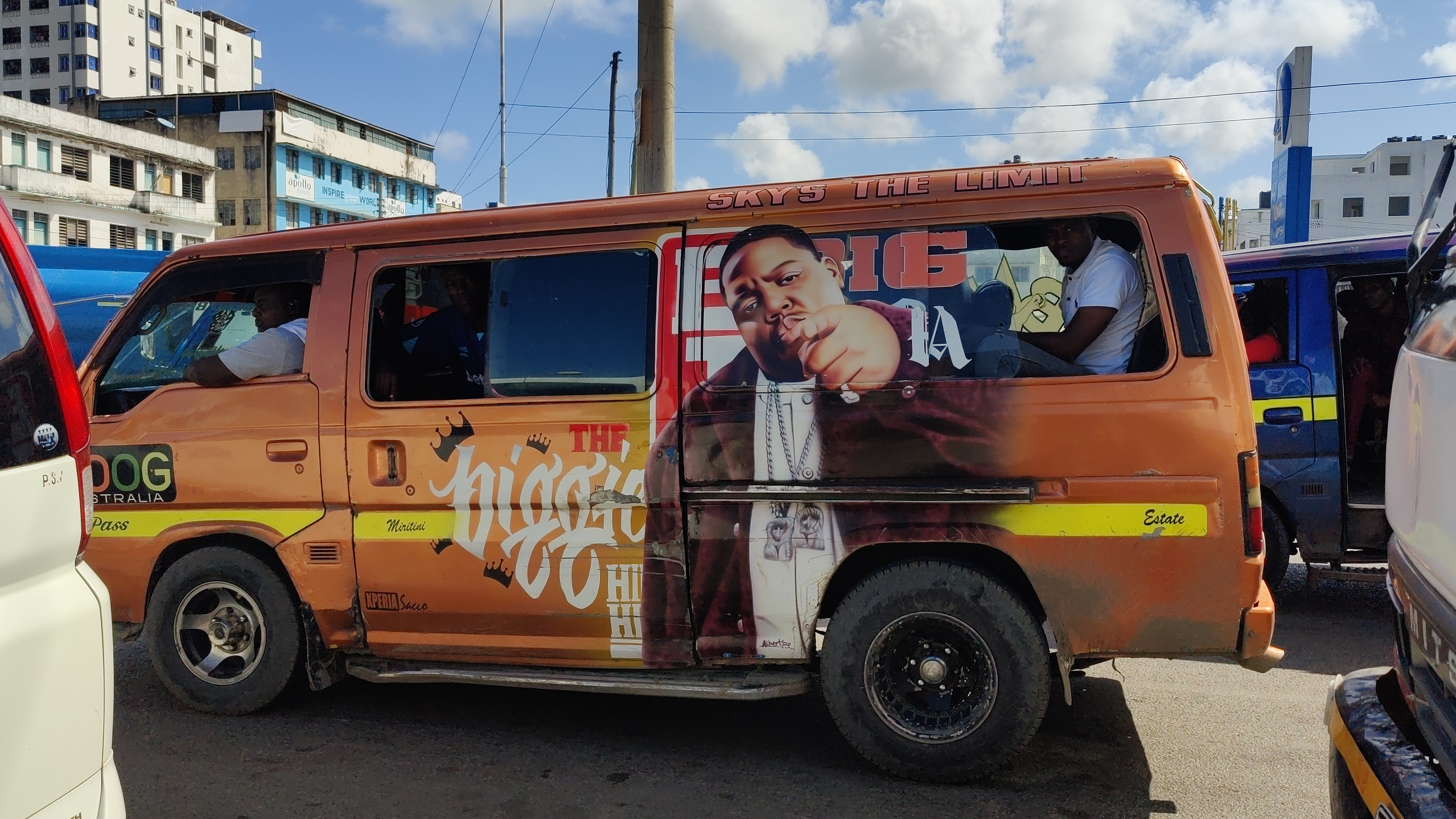
A matatu with American rapper Notorious B.I.G.'s mural in Mombasa

== Public perception ==
At times in Kenya, the matatu has been associated with criminality or reckless driving. Writes one academic, "by the end of the 1990s, matatu operators were typically viewed... by Kenyans of all ranks as thugs who exploited and mistreated passengers and participated in gang or mafia-like violence."

In the early 2000s, a struggle over control of matatu routes by informal groups led to violence, and contemporary headlines highlight the fact that matatu were perceived as unsafe. These include a 2002 article titled "riding in Kenya's taxi vans is [a] death-defying experience" and another from 1999 proclaiming that the "menace of deadly matatus [is] to be curbed." Mistreatment of passengers has also been reported and includes: "verbal and physical abuse, theft, hijacking, ...sexual harassment, beatings, and rape." Corruption in the matatu industry is exacerbated by the prevalent practice of bribery, as matatu operators are forced to pay regular bribes to Kenyan police officers in order to avoid their vehicles being impounded and penalties.

== Matatu art and culture ==
Some of the most elaborately customized matatus are termed nganyas in Sheng, nganyas feature paintings and graffiti of celebrities like footballers, musicians or even politicians; murals of popular media like superheroes; multiple video screens; tinted windows; flashy LED lights and have been described by an NPR journalist as "mobile sound systems". They play a wide variety of music including gospel, R&B, hip-hop and rap on loud sound systems. Nganya culture has become an expression of urban youth creativity, music, identity and offers "therapeutic escape". Nganyas sometimes engage in vehicle stunts like manyoka (Sheng for snakes) and twerking which have at times resulted in serious accidents.

== Kenyan regulation ==
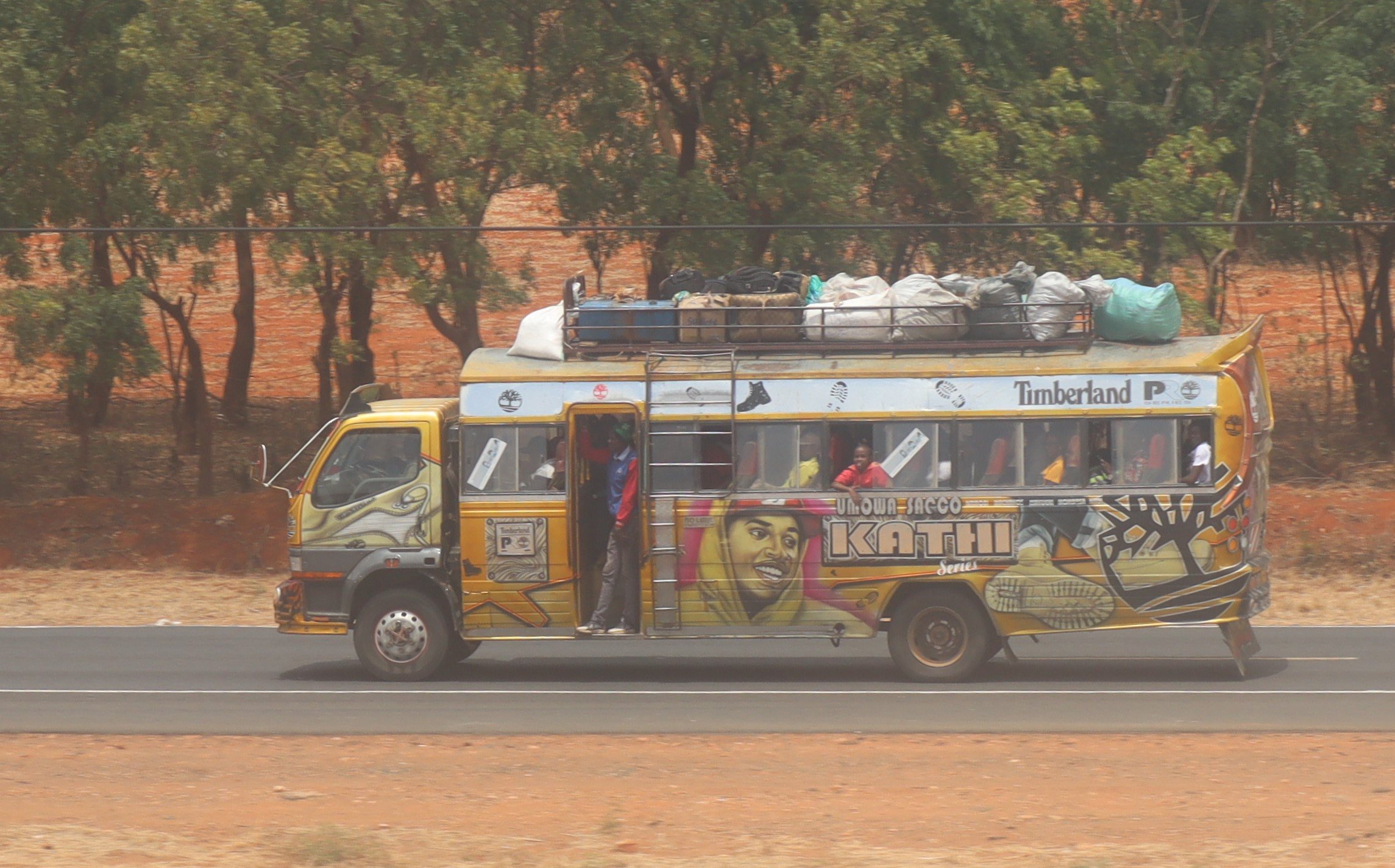
A matatu with a mural of American rapper/singer Chris Brown mural and luggage on top near Voi in 2022

Matatus were explicitly deemed legal in 1973, but it was only in 1984 that even the most basic regulatory framework was constructed for matatus, when licensing and inspections were mandated.

Today, Kenya has been described as having extensive regulatory controls, and a matatu worker can be pulled from the streets simply for sporting too loud a shirt. Some basic safety equipment is required; these minibuses must be fitted with seat belts and speed governors. It is unclear, however, to what extent such laws are followed.

The present regulation may not be a sufficient deterrent to prevent small infractions, as even decoration may be prohibited. Laws prohibiting flashy paint-jobs and eye-searing colors were removed in 2015, and as of 2016, matatus in Kenya are brightly decorated with some operators paying upwards of US$2,000 for custom, decorative paint.

In the 1990s and the 2000s, informal groups emerged managing routes and requiring matatu drivers to pay fees. At times, competition over control of routes precipitated violence. Today, an individual matatu must be associated with one of over 600 independent, government-registered groups known as SACCOs (Savings and Credit Cooperatives).

As of late 2010, the Kenyan government policy is to phase out minibus matatu in the capital city Nairobi in favour of larger buses seating twenty five or more. Currently, no new matatu vehicles can operate in Nairobi, and the existing ones will be allowed to continue serving passengers until they become completely inoperable. It could take ten years or more to ease the congestion caused by more popular smaller minibuses, however.

In May 2026, matatu operators announced a 50% fare increase. This has led them to threaten a nationwide strike to protest against rising fuel costs. School closures were experienced in some areas as a result of protests and strikes.

== Environmental and health impacts ==
Matatus, which are most frequently diesel vehicles, are frequently idling in urban areas, creating additional air and noise pollution. In some areas, matatu drivers are actively discouraged from idling the vehicle while stopped, leading to fuel consumption and exhaust when the vehicle is not in motion. Some companies are exploring electric buses as a potential replacement for the high-emission vehicles. SACCOs like Citi Hoppa and Super Metro started using electric buses in 2022 that were BYD K6 leased by BasiGo.

== In popular media ==
In the Netflix series Sense8, Capheus, a main character who lives in Nairobi, drives the matatu Van Damn, a tribute to Capheus' favorite action star, Jean-Claude Van Damme. A matatu is also featured in an episode of the seventh season of the Netflix series Big Mouth.

== See also ==
- Dala dala, Tanzania
- Tro tro, Ghana
- Jeepney, Philippines
- Colectivo, South America
- Danfo, Nigeria
- Marshrutka, Russia, CIS countries, Baltic states, Ukraine, Armenia, Georgia, Turkmenistan and some former USSR countries, such as Bulgaria.
- Dolmus, Turkey, Northern Cyprus
- Car Rapide, Senegal
