= BasiGo =

Kenyan electric bus leasing company

- Founded: 2021 in Nairobi, Kenya
- Founder: Jit Bhattacharya
- Headquarters: Nairobi, Kenya
- Key people: Jonathan Green (co-founder)
- Website: basi-go.com

BasiGo is a Kenyan electric bus company that leases electric buses to local bus owners. It is headquartered in Nairobi. BasiGo initially imported fully or partially assembled electric buses from BYD Auto; however, since 2023, it has partnered with Associated Vehicle Assemblers to fully assemble imported parts in Kenya. It was founded in 2021 by Jonathan Green and Jit Bhattacharya. As of 2023, BasiGo has almost 20 electric buses, including BYD K6 model electric buses, which have 25 seats each, and E9 Kubwa buses, which have 36 seats each.

== History ==
Following restrictions on diesel for matatus due to the COVID-19 pandemic and environmental changes afterwards, Jit Bhattacharya decided to create the first electric buses in Nairobi, becoming BasiGo's CEO and co-founder.

=== Roll out of the first buses (2021) ===
On 2 November 2021, BasiGo announced the start of its operations in Nairobi, after receiving $1,000,000 in pre-seed funding. Its first two buses began operations on 22 March 2022. They were BYD K6 models operating under Citi Hoppa and East Shuttle matatu companies, with one bus passing through Buruburu and Dandora and the other one moving through Allsops, Jomo Kenyatta International Airport and the Nairobi CBD. Within 6 months, the buses had covered 150,000 km and carried over 155,000 passengers, according to Jit Bhattacharya.

After getting its first two vehicles, BasiGo shipped 15 more BYD K6 electric buses, which were cleared from the port of Mombasa on 30 November 2022. Unlike the first two buses, the new buses were shipped while partially assembled; their creation was finished in Kenya by Associated Vehicle Assemblers in January 2023. On 14 February 2023, the new buses were flagged off and began to operate within Nairobi under different local shuttles.

=== Expansion to Rwanda (2023) ===
On 26 July 2023, BasiGo signed letters of intent with Rwandan bus operators Royal Express, Volcano Express and Kigali Bus Service to provide them with electric buses via a Pay-As-You-Drive model. They also announced their partnership with AC Mobility, an automated fare collection service provider.

In November 2023, USAID granted BasiGo $1,500,000 to conduct research with Rwandan bus operators and riders to study the model's profitability in the Rwandan market. They were also tasked to establish an urban pollution monitoring system to track how BasiGo lowered pollution in Rwanda. As of December 2023, the first two buses designated for Kigali arrived at Mombasa port.

== Leasing ==
After the shipping and assembly of the first buses, BasiGo began leasing them to local matatu companies via a Pay-as-you-drive model. This model operated via two options. The first option allowed companies to buy a bus without batteries for $35,600; BasiGo would then lease the batteries to them, with local matatu operators paying BasiGo $0.16 per kilometer driven using a battery. The other option was to lease the entire bus by paying an up-front deposit and paying the rest while operating the bus.

As of 2023, BasiGo has leased electric buses to 5 local Kenyan bus shuttles.

Local Shuttle	No. of buses	Model	Routes
Citi Hoppa	1	BYD K6	CBD, Allsops, JKIA
East Shuttle	1	BYD K6	Buruburu, Dandora
OMA Services	2	BYD K6	CBD, Jogoo Road, Buruburu, Civil servants
Embassava	4	BYD K6	CBD, Jacaranda Estate, Nyayo Estate
Super Metro	1	BYD K6	CBD, Kikuyu, Kitengela
Metro Trans	5	BYD K6	Utawala, Community-Upperhill, Kiambu

== Public bus charging station establishment ==
In May 2023, BasiGo unveiled the first public electric charging station for electric buses in Buruburu. This was their third charging station; however, their other charging stations were not for public use. The first two were established in Embakasi and Kikuyu. The third charging station is able to charge up to 6 buses simultaneously. BasiGo's charging stations rely on renewable energy, since they receive energy from the national energy grid, which receives 90% of its energy from renewable sources during the day and 100% from them at night.

== Awards and achievements ==
- Keeling Curve Prize (2022) - $25,000
- Best mobility and logistics award at the Global Startup Awards Africa (2023).
