= BYD K series =

Line of Chinese battery electric buses

BYD K series (ebus)
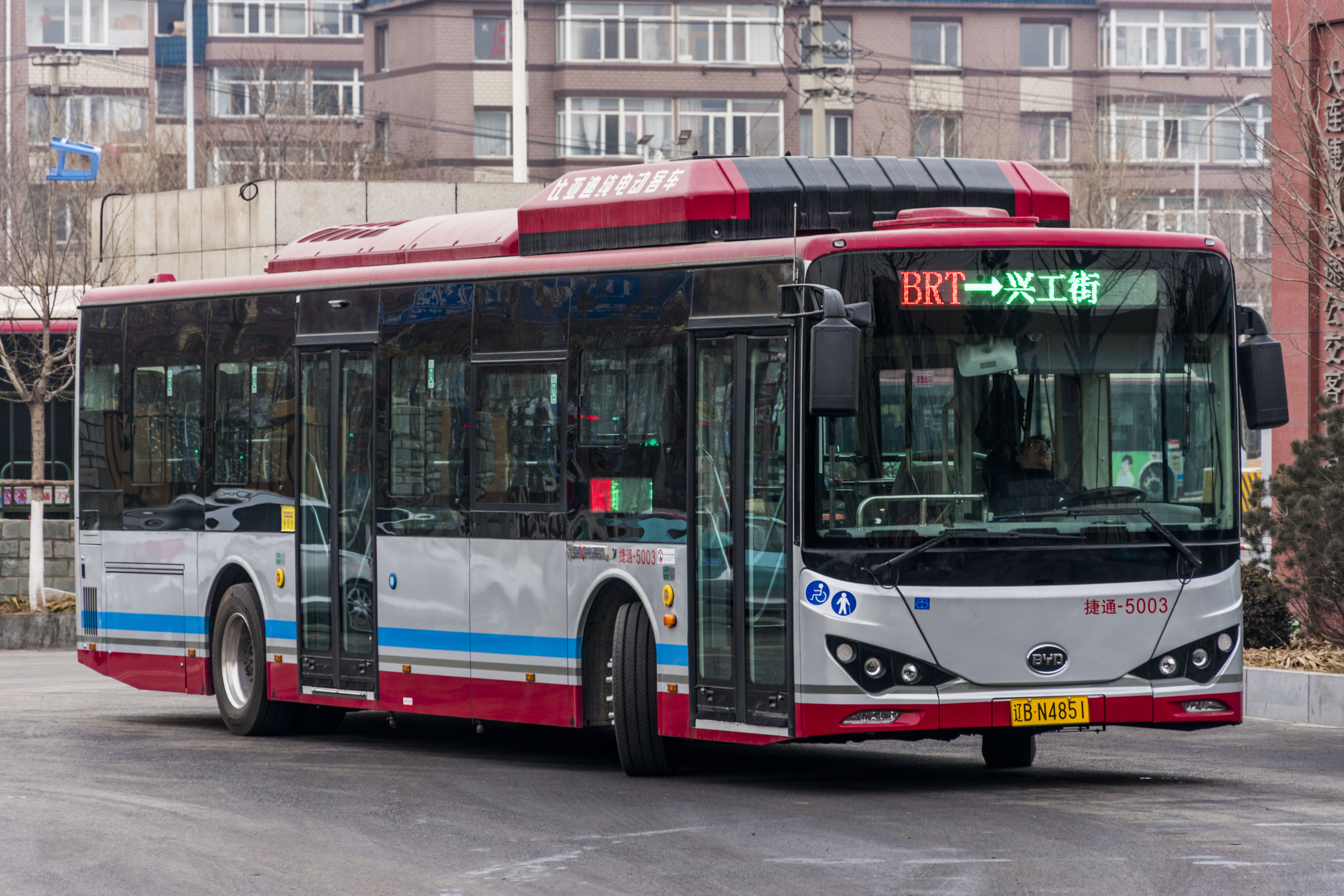
- A BYD K9FE on the Dalian BRT in 2018

Overview
- Manufacturer: BYD Auto
- Production: 2010–present
- Assembly: China: Changsha; Dalian; Azerbaijan: Sumgait; Brazil: Campinas; Canada: Newmarket, Ontario (closed); South korea: Seoul,Gyeonggi-do; France: Beauvais; Hungary: Komárom; United States: Lancaster, California; Thailand: Bangna, Bangkok

Body and chassis
- Class: Battery electric bus
- Body style: Single-deck bus (rigid and articulated) and double-deck bus
- Floor type: Low floor

Powertrain
- Engine: Electric wheel hub motors
- Electric motor: Permanent-magnet synchronous motors
- Propulsion: IGBT–VVVF
- Electric range: 250 km (K9)

The BYD K series are a line of battery electric buses manufactured by the Chinese automaker BYD, powered with its self-developed lithium iron phosphate battery, featuring a typical operating range of 250 kilometres (160 mi) per charge under urban road conditions. It is available in several different nominal lengths, from 7.0 to 13.7 m (23 to 45 ft) and also as a 18 m (60 ft) (articulated) bus. The rear axle is powered by two electric traction motors; the battery capacity and motor power of each model varies depending on the nominal length and passenger capacity.

== History and development ==
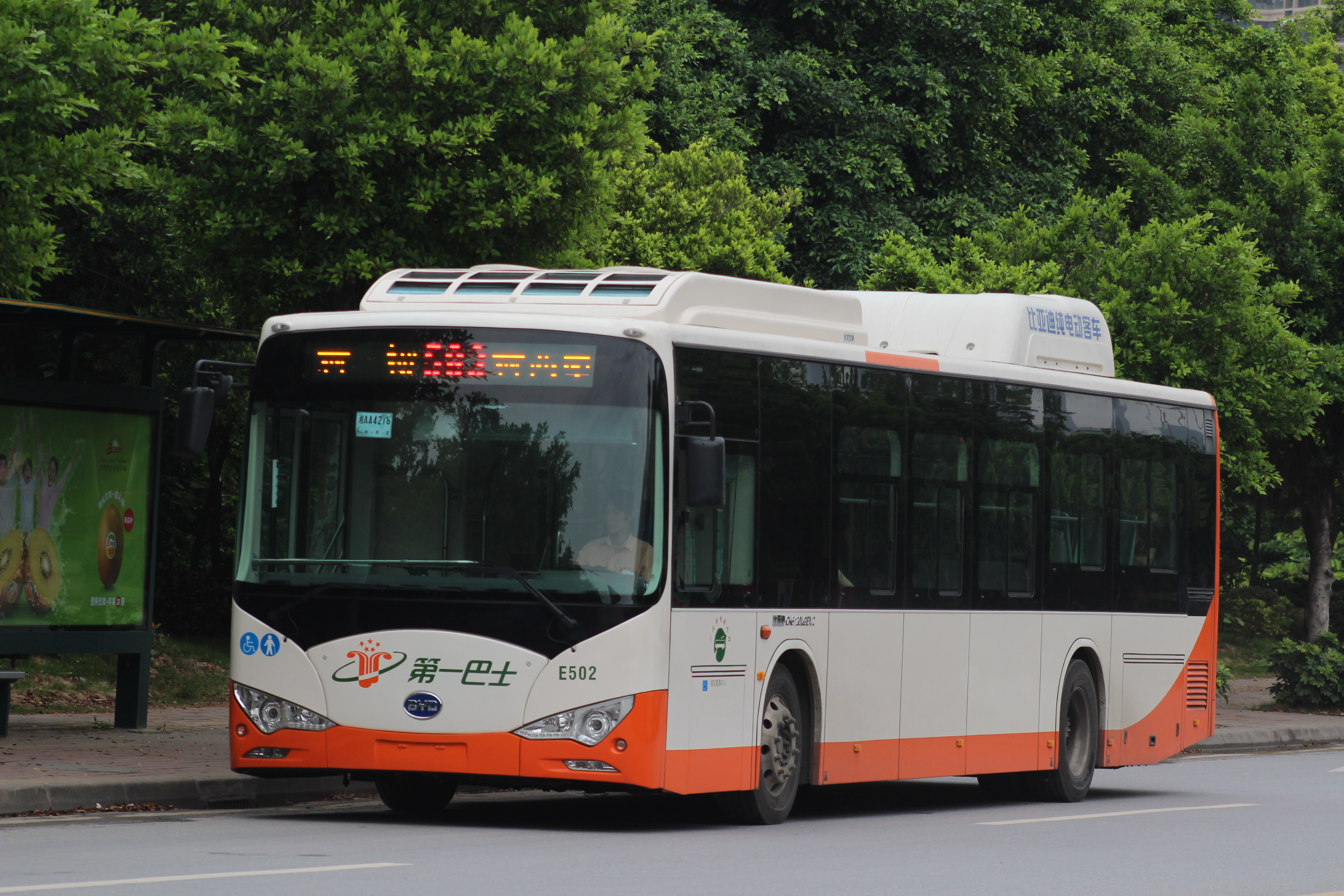
BYD K9A in Guangzhou

The first BYD battery electric K-series bus was manufactured on 30 September 2010 in Changsha city of Hunan province. Previously, BYD had built electric vehicle models like F3DM, F6DM and e6. K9 has a 12-meter body length and 18-ton weight with one-step low-floor interior. It is reportedly priced at 2–3 million yuan (S$395,000 – S$592,600).

The K-series bus has been bought by operators in Mainland China, India, Japan, Hong Kong, United States, Colombia, Chile, Spain, Netherlands, Denmark, Aruba, Malaysia and Singapore.

The company extended its production base in Tianjin, China at the end of July, 2012 and may plan to manufacture in Brazil and Windsor, Canada. BYD built and operates an electric bus factory in Lancaster, California, US. The new factory started production in October 2013. Los Angeles has already introduced electric buses for the metro authority and has primarily relied on BYD buses for this plan, which as a company has become the top electric bus manufacturer in North America. In December 2014, another manufacturing plant began operation in Dalian, Liaoning, China. The BYD plant in Komárom is BYD's first wholly-owned bus factory in Europe. The facility was opened in 2017 and primarily manufactures electric buses for European customers. A significant expansion of the plant was announced in 2025. The capacity will triple and will produce 1,250 electric buses and trucks annually.

== Specifications ==
BYD model numbers (e.g., K9) include K (designating "transit bus") and a number (designating nominal length; larger numbers indicate longer buses).

Various letter suffixes have been applied, including:

- M: North American market
- R: right-hand drive
- S: Double-decker bus
- ER: Extended Range

Model	Image	Nominal length	Seats (max) (Note: "+1" indicates driver's seat)	Power	Torque	Battery capacity	Range (max)
K5		6 m (20 ft)	11–17+1	(Note: Single traction motor in China.)		97 kWh	210 km (130 mi)
K6		6.5 m (20 ft)	11–21+1			144 kWh	265 km (165 mi)
K7 (Note: In North America, the K7M was designated K7 and had a smaller 180 kWh battery with a claimed range of 220 km (137 mi).) (Note: Also available as an extended-range K7MER, with enhanced power using traction motors from the K8/K9 and extended range from a larger battery.)		8.5 m (30 ft)	13–26+1	2×90 kW (120 hp)	2×400 N⋅m (300 lb⋅ft)	215 kWh	254 km (158 mi)
K8 (Note: In North America, the K8M was previously designated K9S and had a 350 kWh battery with a claimed range of greater than 370 km (230 mi).)		10.5 m (35 ft)	20–39+1	2×150 kW (200 hp)	2×550 N⋅m (410 lb⋅ft)	391 kWh	315 km (196 mi)
K8S		10.5 m (35 ft) (double deck)	?	2×150 kW (200 hp)	2×550 N⋅m (410 lb⋅ft)	? kWh	?
K9 (Note: In North America, the K9M was previously designated K9 and had a 324 kWh battery with a claimed range of 251 km (156 mi).) (Note: Also available as an extended-range K9MD, with enhanced power using traction motors from the K11M and range from a larger battery.) (Note: Sold as D9RA in Australia)		12 m (40 ft)	23–44+1	2×150 kW (200 hp)	2×550 N⋅m (410 lb⋅ft)	313 kWh	253 km (157 mi)
K10 (Note: Intended for use as an airport shuttle bus. A customized variant was designated K10MR and sold to Denver RTD.)		14 m (45 ft)	13+1 (Note: Maximum capacity of 106+1 (standing/seated combined))	?		292 kWh	?
K11 (Note: Previously designated K11, with a 652 kWh battery and claimed range of 370 km (230 mi).)		18 m (60 ft) (artic.)	55+1	2×180 kW (240 hp)	2×1,500 N⋅m (1,100 lb⋅ft)	578 kWh	311 km (193 mi)

Notes

BYD's official published specifications for its K9 electric bus include:

- Electric power consumption: less than 100kWh/60mins
- Acceleration: 0–50 km/h in 20s
- Top speed: 96 km/h
- Normal charge: 6h for full charge
- Fast charge: 1h for full charge
- Overnight charging: 60 kW maximum power for 5h full charge
- Range: 155 miles (249 km) (186 miles (299 km) according to some reports)
- Length × Width × Height: 12,000 mm × 2,550 mm × 3,200 mm (472 in × 100 in × 126 in)
- Standard seats: 31+1 (31 for passengers and 1 for driver)
- Weight: 18,000 kg (40,000 lb)
- Clearance between one-step entry and ground: 360 mm (14 in)

Two or more versions of this bus have been delivered. The two-door version is in service in China's Shenzhen, Changsha, Xi'an and Shaoguan while the 3-door version operates in Shenzhen, Bogota etc. for test and demonstration purposes.

=== Battery and powertrain ===
The K-series buses are powered by LiFePO_{4} batteries developed by BYD, which also have been applied to BYD e6, BYD DESS and other energy storage products. BYD claims that the chemical materials contained in the battery can be recycled without any toxins. Battery capacities range from approximately 100 to 600 kWh, depending on the fitted drive axle and bus size. As tested at Altoona for the United States market, consumption and range were 1.36 kWh/mi and 173.62 km (107.88 mi) (K7), 1.74–2.45 kWh/mi and 280 to 394 km (174 to 245 mi), depending on the operating cycle (K8M with 435 kWh battery and the 2×150 kW (200 hp) axle), 1.99 kWh/mi and 208 km (129 mi) (K9 with 324 kWh battery and the 2×90 kW (120 hp) axle), and 2.09 to 3.74 kWh/mi and 254 to 455 km (158 to 283 mi), depending on the operating cycle (K11M with 578 kWh battery and the 2×150 kW (200 hp) axle).

The drivetrain uses an in-hub motor and reduction gear for each wheel on the drive axle. At least three distinct axles are offered:

- 2×90 kW (120 hp) and 2×400 N⋅m (300 lbf⋅ft) (K7, K8, K9)
- 2×150 kW (200 hp) and 2×550 N⋅m (410 lbf⋅ft) (K8, K9)
- 2×180 kW (240 hp) and 2×1,500 N⋅m (1,100 lbf⋅ft) (K9, K11)

Solar panels fixed on the vehicle were once reported to supplement the onboard batteries. They were included on demo units, but not on units sold commercially.

=== Safety ===
Safety features include unitary construction body, 4-wheel disc brakes, ABS+ASR, one-step easy-pass with special footplates for wheelchair access and non-step inside.

=== Body and interior design ===
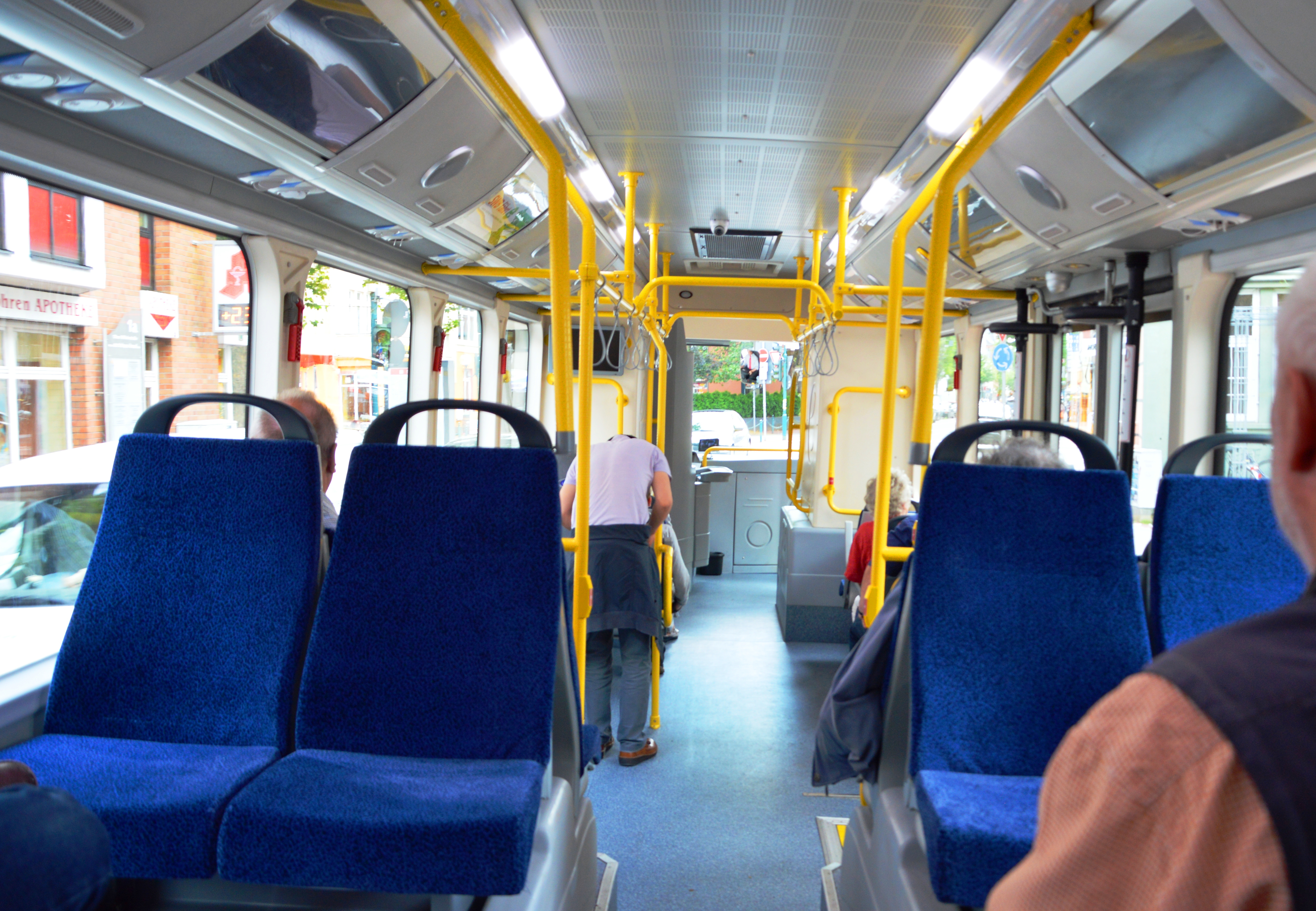
BYD electric bus interior in Germany.

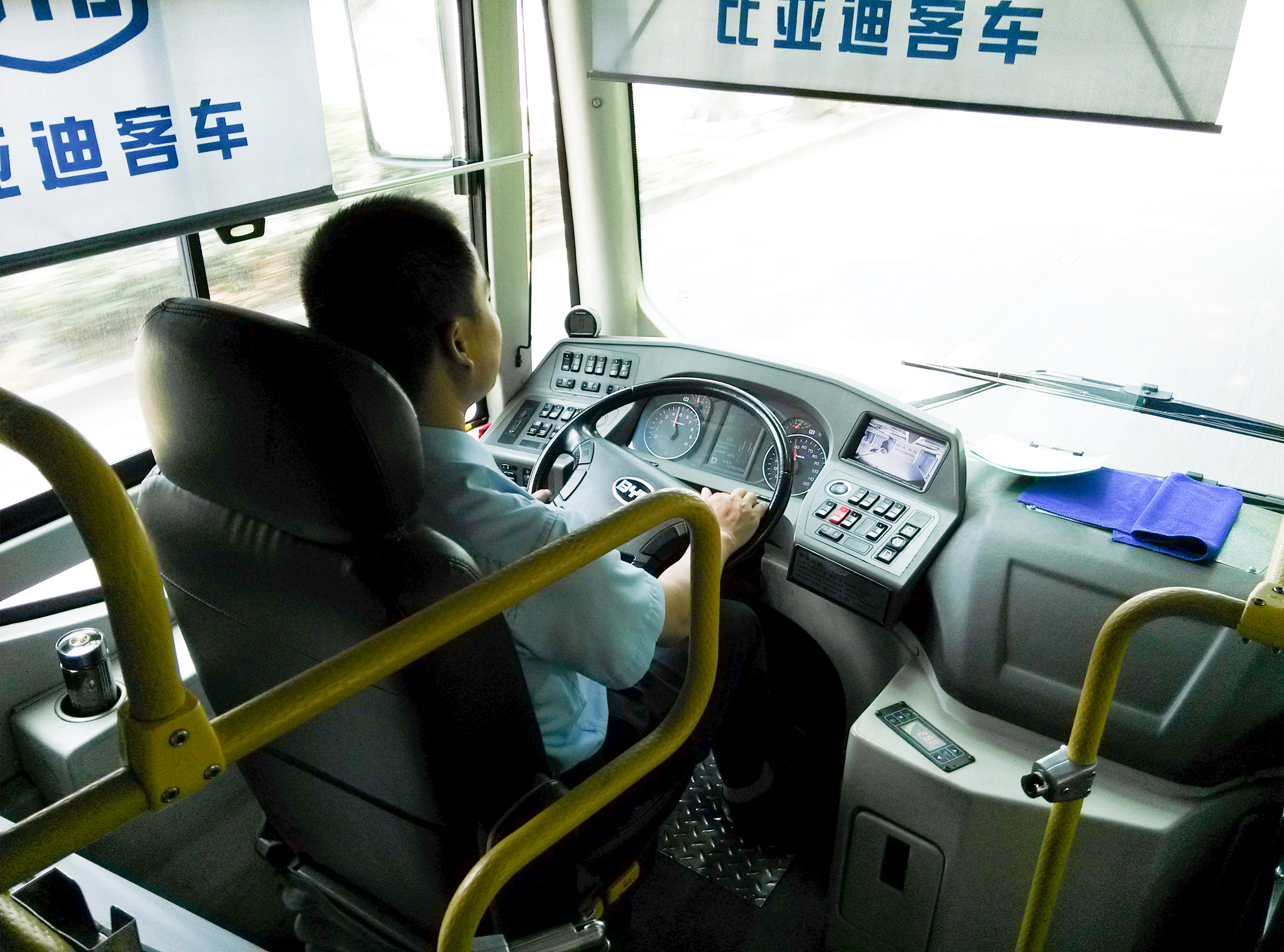
BYD electric bus driving cockpit in Shenzhen.

The body comes silver, yellow or green (for different markets). In the silver version the front windscreen occupies two-thirds of the front of the bus for maximum visibility. It includes adjustable leather seating for driver and red and black leather seats for passengers. The battery cabins are laid in the bus rear on both sides. While the Battery housing are located at the front.

=== Costs ===
BYD calculates that a BYD ebus over 8 years saves about $190,000 in energy costs. In 2012, the price for a BYD ebus was €380,000 Euros, €100,000 more than a comparable diesel bus.

=== Evaluations and comparisons ===
To qualify for federal subsidies in the United States, heavy-duty transit buses must be assembled domestically (under the requirements of the "Buy America Act") and pass durability testing for an accelerated equivalent 12-year period at the Pennsylvania Transportation Institute in Altoona, Pennsylvania. To meet these requirements, BYD has opened a bus production facility in Lancaster, California in 2013 and K7 (2017), K8 (2021), K9 (2014), and K11 (2020) buses have been tested at Altoona.

In addition, LADOT and Long Beach Transit have conducted long-term comparison tests between BYD battery-electric buses and similarly sized buses fueled with compressed natural gas. In general, the BEBs were more efficient than the CNG buses, with energy consumption measured approximately 1.12–1.13 kW⋅h/km; 4.0–4.1 MJ/km (1.81–1.82 kW⋅h/mi), equivalent to 20.7 mpg‑e (163 kW⋅h/100 mi) (diesel gallon equivalent); the consumption of the CNG buses was measured at an equivalent 9.67 kW⋅h/km; 34.8 MJ/km (15.56 kW⋅h/mi) or 3.49 mpg‑e (970 kW⋅h/100 mi) (diesel gallon equivalent). It was noted that consumption increased during summer months, presumably due to the use of air conditioning systems. In addition, the BEBs were less reliable, being taken out of service more often than the CNG buses and requiring more frequent roadcalls over a shorter distance traveled; the mean distance between roadcalls for the Long Beach BYD evaluation fleet was 6,830 km (4,244 mi), compared to 24,169 km (15,018 mi) for the CNG comparison bus fleet.

== Policies ==
At a press conference in Beijing on 4 November 2012, BYD announced "Zero vehicle purchase price, Zero costs, Zero emissions", to promote the sale of its e6 and K9. The initiative is supported financially by China Development Bank from a fund totalling over 30 Billion RMB ($4.6B USD), and allows buyers to finance 100% of the purchase price with no down payment, paying a lease rate that effectively costs less than regular monthly operational expenses.

Under the scheme, available in China, public transport operators can choose the ownership model from three different options:

Model	Financing body	Lease period	Ownership
Financial Lease	Finance Company	A complete operational life cycle (e.g. 5 years)	During the lease period, the financial organization owns the vehicle. The taxi company pays the lease in installments. After the lease period ends, the taxi company owns the vehicle.
Operational Lease	Third party vehicle lease company	A complete operating life cycle (e.g. 5 years) or a shorter period (e.g. 1 year)	During the lease period and thereafter, the vehicle lease company owns the vehicle. The taxi company and the vehicle lease company sign an operational lease contract.
Buyer's Credit	The Taxi Company		The taxi company owns the vehicle. The taxi company pays monthly installments to the financial institution.

The company explained the concept of "Zero Costs" by comparing difference between the five-year cost of running a conventional taxi in Shenzhen, as against its all-electric taxicab. It came to the conclusion that "if the car runs for 5 years, and the total saving over 5 years is deducted from the higher cost of the vehicle and the interest on multiple payments, it can save 326,400 RMB. The company also claimed that if enough distance is covered, "the vehicle payment will be entirely offset". BYD also promoted the "Zero Emission" feature of its renewable-energy vehicles by stating that "an e6 electric taxi saves 14,120 litres of fuel per year, with 32 tonnes fewer CO2 emissions", and "169 million litres of fuel could be saved with CO2 emissions reduced by 38.62 million tonnes per year" if all Chinese taxis were to be replaced with its electric vehicles.

== Global deployment ==
=== Worldwide ===
In both 2011 and 2012, BYD obtained orders from amounting to 1200+ units. More than 200 K9s in service in Shenzhen had accumulated over 9,216,000 km (5,727,000 mi) by the end of August 2012.

In 2015, BYD sold about 6,000 of these buses worldwide. BYD became the world leader in the sale of electric vehicles in 2015.

=== Mainland China ===
- 200 units were delivered to the Shenzhen public transmit system to serve the Universiade 2011 in August, 2011 and remained as part of this city's transport system. This (world's largest) electric bus fleet had reportedly accumulated over 9,216,000 km (5,727,000 mi) by the end of August 2012. By 2017 the fleet had increased to 780, covering more than 106,000,000 km (66,000,000 mi).
- 2 buses began trial service in Changsha 100 more were expected to begin service there in 2012. BYD's Changsha facility was to produce 20,000 passenger vehicles and 400 pure electric buses, increasing to 3,000 electric buses and 100,000 passenger vehicles in 2013.
- 3 K9s began service in Shaoguan, Guangdong province on November 3, 2011.
- 4 K8s began service in Xi'an in August 2012 with another 46 units expected to join them around the end of 2012.
- Haikou City began testing K9s in August 2011.
- In July 2012 BYD and Tianjin Public Transportation Group Ltd agreed to set up a joint venture to produce new energy vehicles. It became the company's second K9 production site in mainland China.
- The largest K9 fleet since 2014 was in Dalian, 600 units. A further 600 vehicles was planned to arrive in 2015.
- In May 2014 BYD announced an order of 2000 ebuses and 1000 eTaxis for Hangzhou. As of 2014 China about 500,000 conventional city buses were in daily use. BYD sold in 2014 in the first quarter more than 4,000 vehicles, while sales of former market leader Daimler dropped by 20% in 2013.

=== North America ===
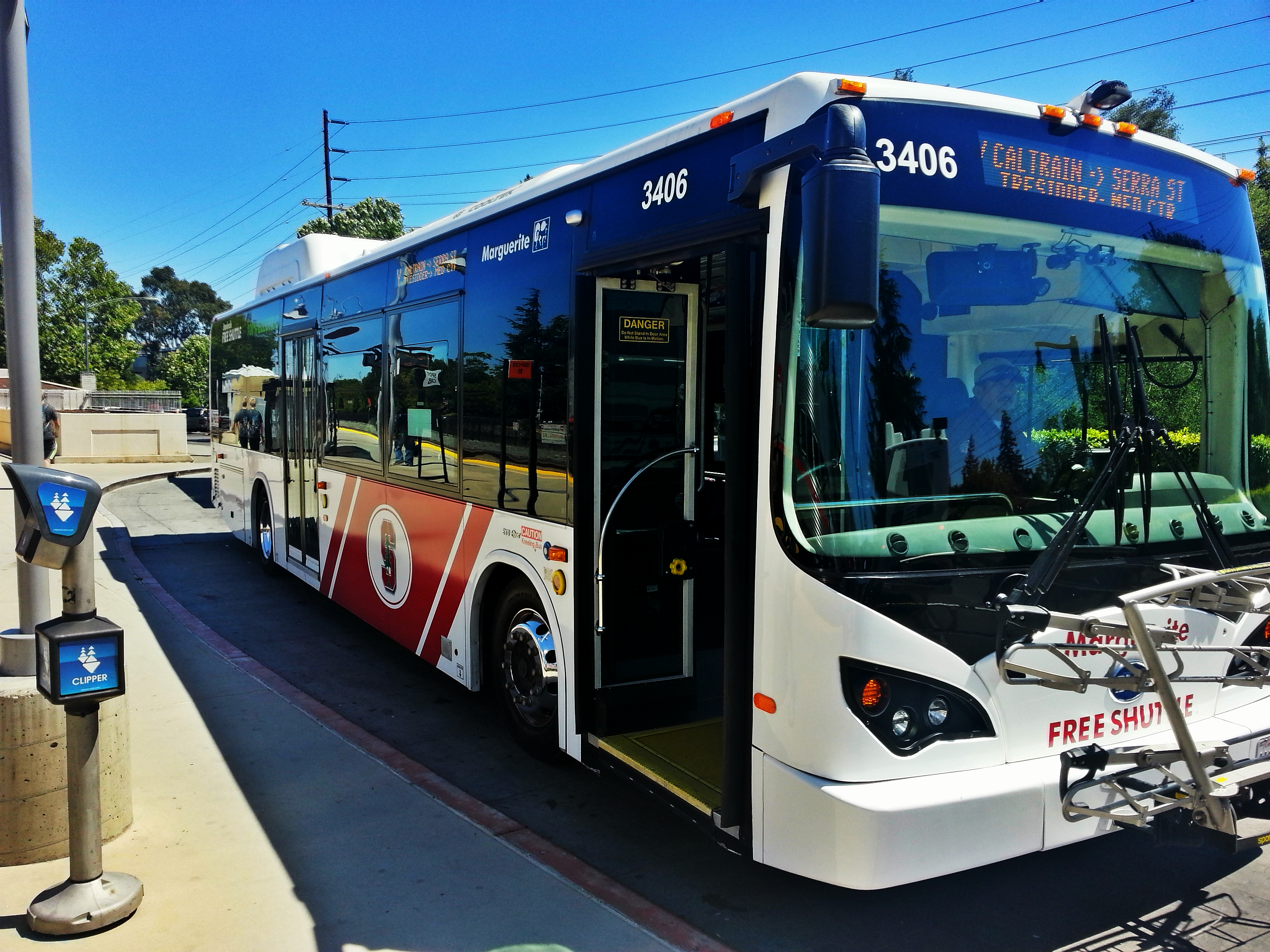
A North American-spec BYD bus with Stanford Marguerite Shuttle.

In the North American transit bus market, the K-series bus is sold with several different nominal lengths, powertrain options, and battery capacities.

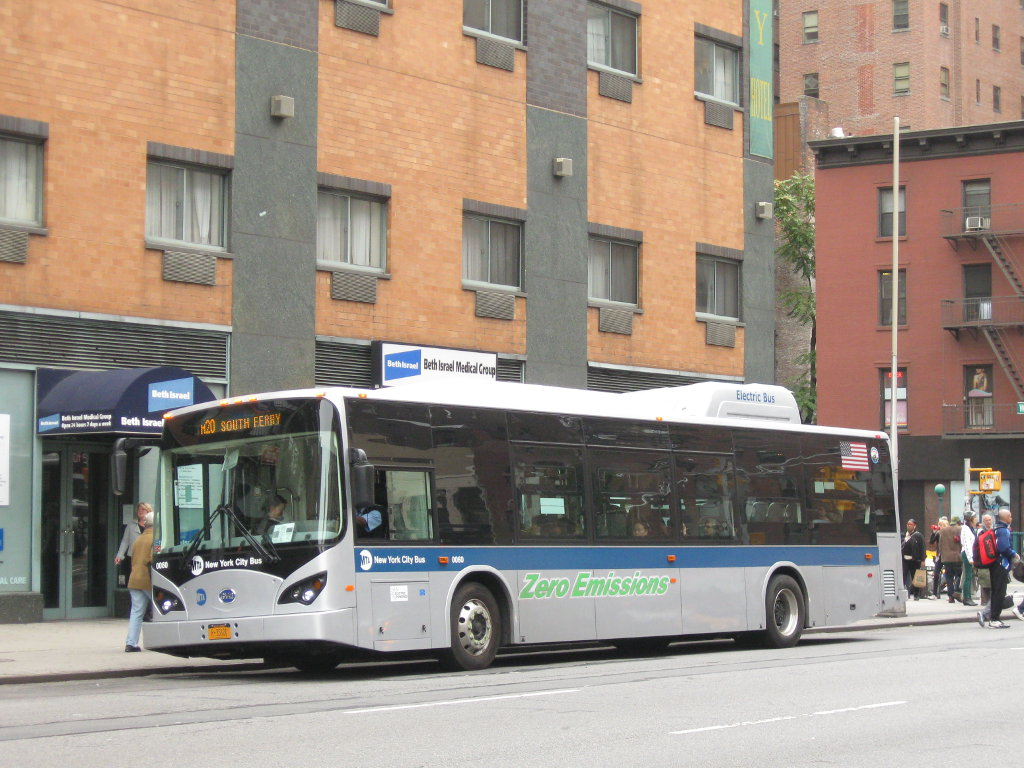
A North American-spec BYD bus in New York City with MTA Regional Bus Operations.

- BYD announced its bus in the US at the 16th BUSCON in Chicago on September 13, 2011. BYD supplied one K9 bus to be retrofitted with WAVE's wireless charging pad under the bus, developed by the Utah State University Energy Dynamics Laboratory in 2012.
- The city of Windsor, Ontario signed a letter of intent to order as many as 10 BYD electric buses in May 2012. The plan failed with no plant built in Windsor and no orders made by Transit Windsor.
- BYD has supplied the Los Angeles Metro system with buses since 2015. A 2018 investigation by the Los Angeles Times found serious reliability issues with the BYD buses.
- Aruba plans to use BYD by 2020. The country signed a memorandum of understanding (MOU) with BYD to place four BYD buses and one e6 electric taxi for public/government use, to be in service by the end of September 2013.
- The Denver's Regional Transportation District purchased 36 BYD K10MR buses for use on their MallRide service.
- TransLink, which services Vancouver, British Columbia began a three-month trial of BYD bus in May 2017.
- University of California, Irvine acquired 20 BYD electric buses for its Anteater Express shuttle service in 2018 in a $15 million lease-to-own deal, becoming the first college in the US to convert to an all-electric fleet.
- Montreal Transit Corporation acquired four BYD K7M minibuses in 2018 for $2.6 million CAD, for their use on line 212. Due to their insufficient range to run the line all day, they were never used and currently stored in the Saint-Laurent garage.
- Anaheim Transportation Network, which serves the Disneyland and Disney California Adventure theme parks with its Anaheim Resort Transportation service, awarded a 40-bus order to BYD in May 2019, including a mix of K7M, K9M, and K11M buses. The contract was later increased to 42 buses, and the first two were delivered in 2020.
- Toronto Transit Commission received their first two K9M buses in January 2020 and remaining 8 in February 2020. Newmarket plant that assembled the order closed after 2023. The 10 buses delivered to the TTC were pulled from service in 2025 and stored at yard in Etobicoke.
- The San Francisco Municipal Railway procured three BYD K9M buses as part of a battery-electric bus evaluation during 2021 and 2022. In total twelve BEBs will be evaluated during the pilot program, including buses from competitors New Flyer (XE40), Proterra (ZX5), and Nova Bus (LFSe).
- IndyGo purchased 13 BYD K11M Electric Buses for its Red Line in 2018 (later expanded to 31 buses). A 2021 investigation conducted by WRTV found battery range issues in the BYD K11Ms used on the Red Line. They purchased 28 more for the Purple Line (10 in 2023, 18 in 2024).

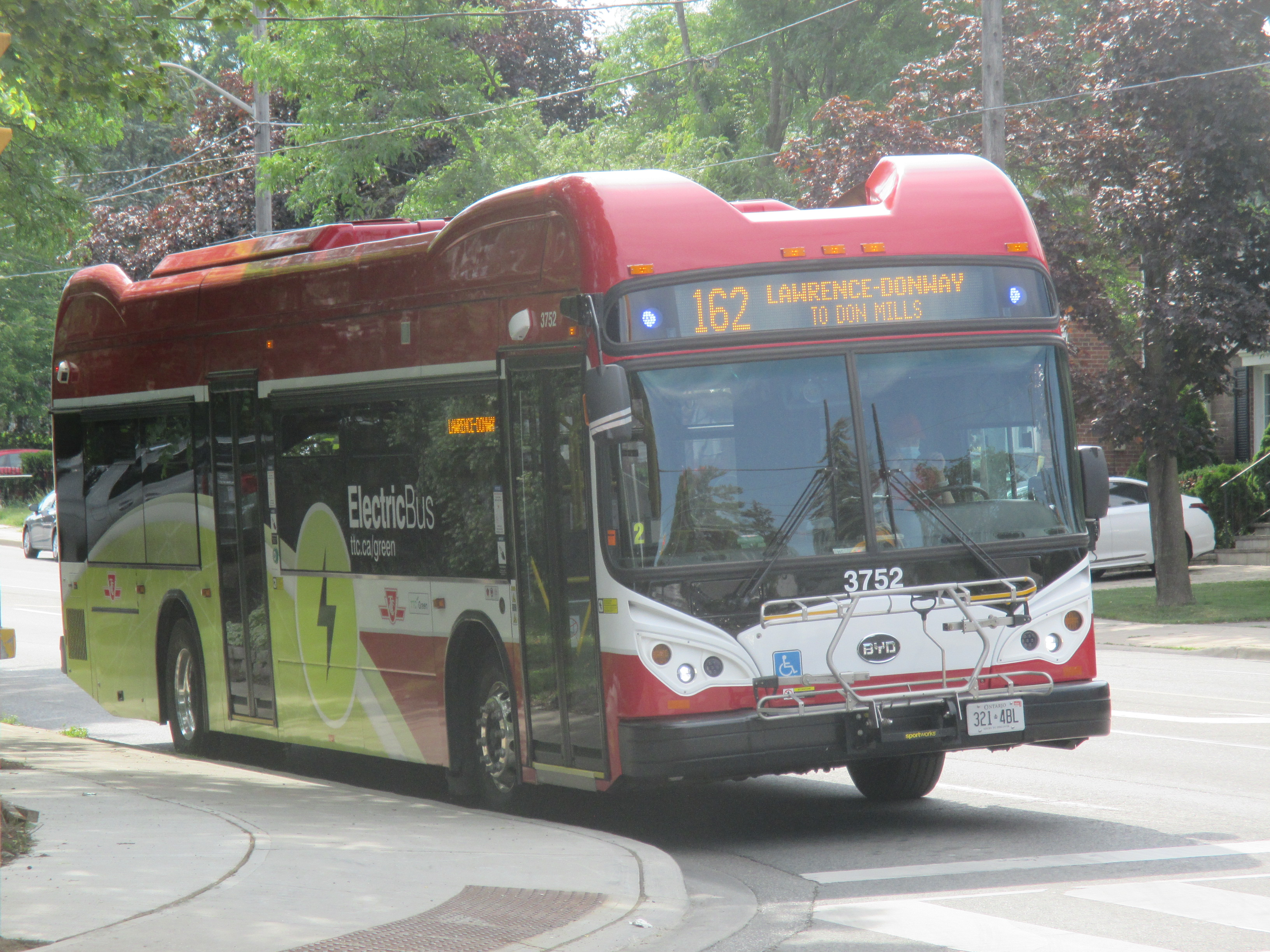
A BYD K9M eBus with roof fairings owned by the Toronto Transit Commission.

=== South America ===
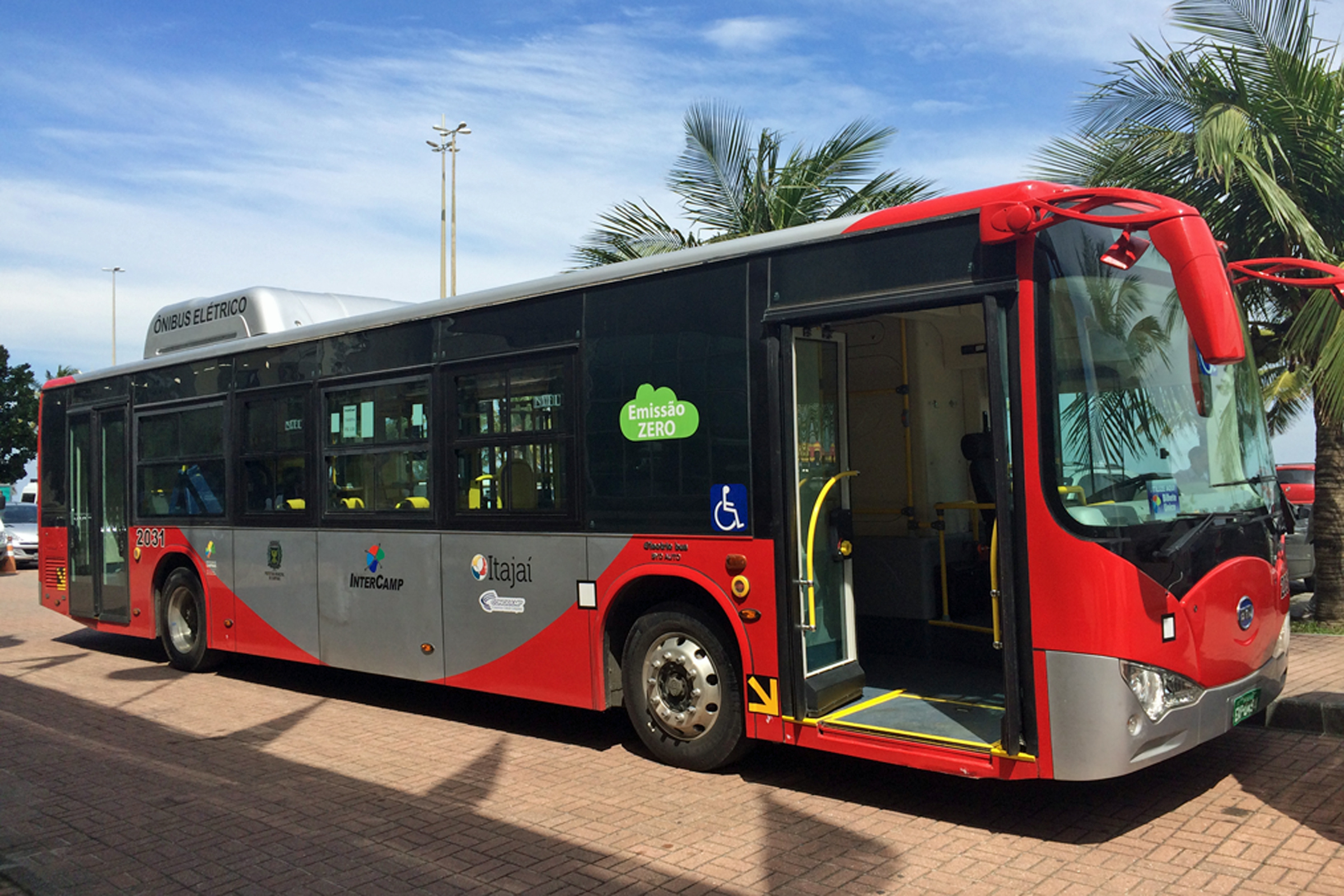
BYD K9 electric bus in Rio de Janeiro

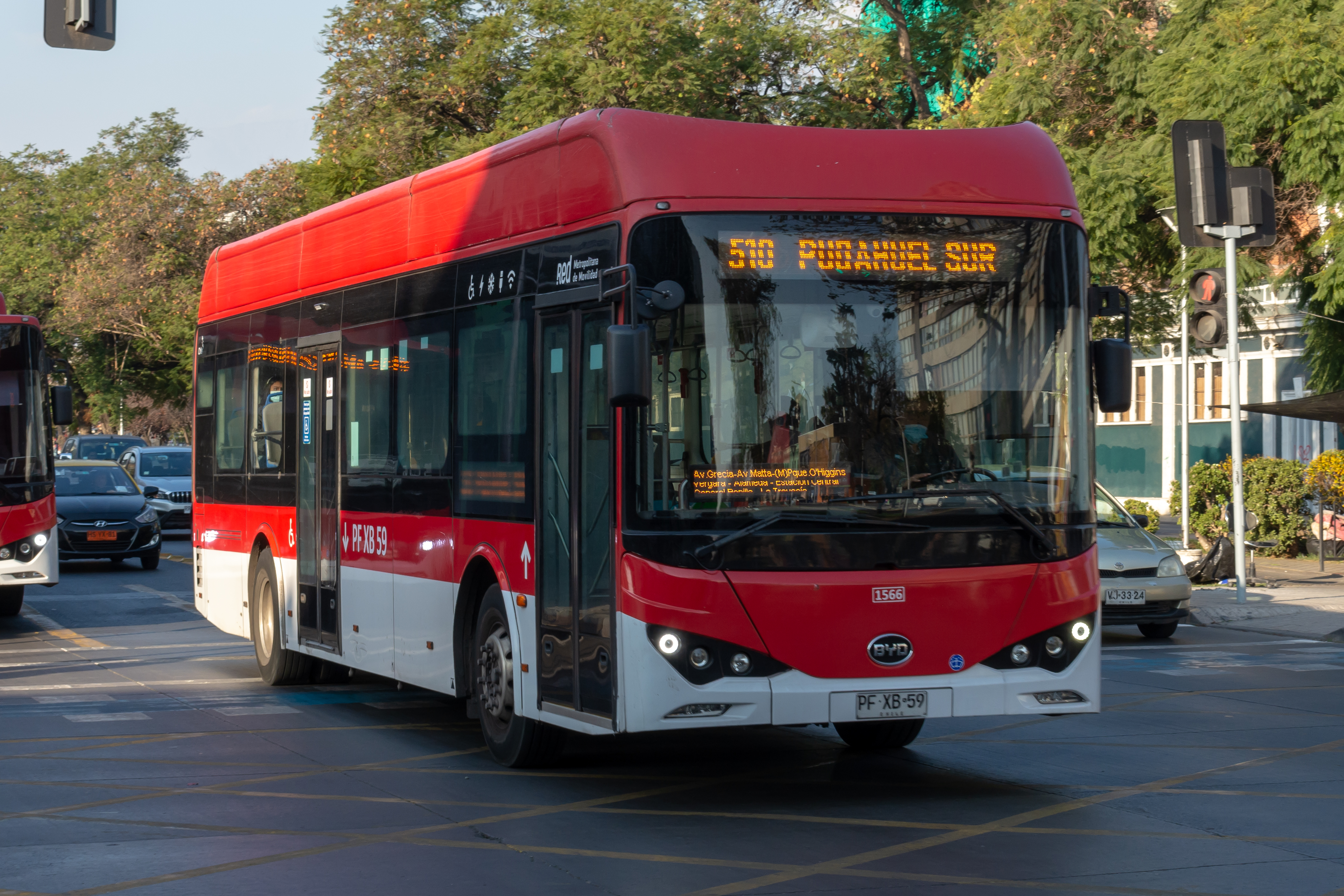
BYD K9 bus in Santiago, Chile

- On June 20, 2012, BYD and Chilean collaborator Indumotora Company secured a contract with Alsacia, one of the biggest operators in Santiago's public transport system, for 5 K9 units. However up to now, Metbus, another operator of Santiago's public transport system, operates two BYD K9FE units.
- BYD scheduled a large commercial operation of its K9 in Brazil and set up a bus production factory there which, however, is not certified by BYD. The mayor of São Paulo, Brazil confirmed plan to introduce at least 5 BYD electric buses to São Paulo by the end of 2012.
- At the beginning of 2012, BYD and Buquebus officials signed a contract to begin importing 500 buses into Uruguay. According to Bernama, the first buses would arrive in Uruguay before during 2012 with 500 buses running by 2015.
- BYD entered a fuel-efficiency testing program in Colombia run by the Clinton Climate Initiative (CCI) and InterAmerican Development Bank (IADB). Running against diesel and CNG-hybrid buses on a 12-mile route that took between 60 and 90 minutes to complete, BYD won by achieving a 7.3 km/liter-equivalent by measuring costs and 11 km/liter-equivalent measuring by energy output. Peru has also tested BYD's electric bus. A fleet of 12-meter 80-passenger units was to be delivered to Bogotá for trial operation as of Q2 2013. The first one-month stage of this project was to focus on testing the fleet on operational performance, energy consumption, battery behavior and total energy consumption. BYD has delivered 800 units as of sep-2022 and is expected to deliver 1002 units.
- In December 2018, 100 units were added to the public transport system of Santiago de Chile, together with the first charge terminal for electric buses in Latin America.
- On 19 May 2020 20 BYD New K9 units were presented in Uruguay´s capital Montevideo by its biggest bus service operator CUTCSA; these buses were bought for specific use in three exclusively electric bus lines, CE1 (shared with two other operators in an 80% / 10%, / 10% division), DE1 and E14 and were acquired with national funding; they were presented with presence of both municipal and national authorities. On 11 April 2024 CUTCSA announced the signature of a contract for the delivery of 100 BYD K9UD urban electric buses, with the first batch of 50 arriving on 3 December 2024 while the remaining arrived on 1 October 2025.

=== Asia Pacific ===
A BYD battery-run electric bus on Rapid KL.

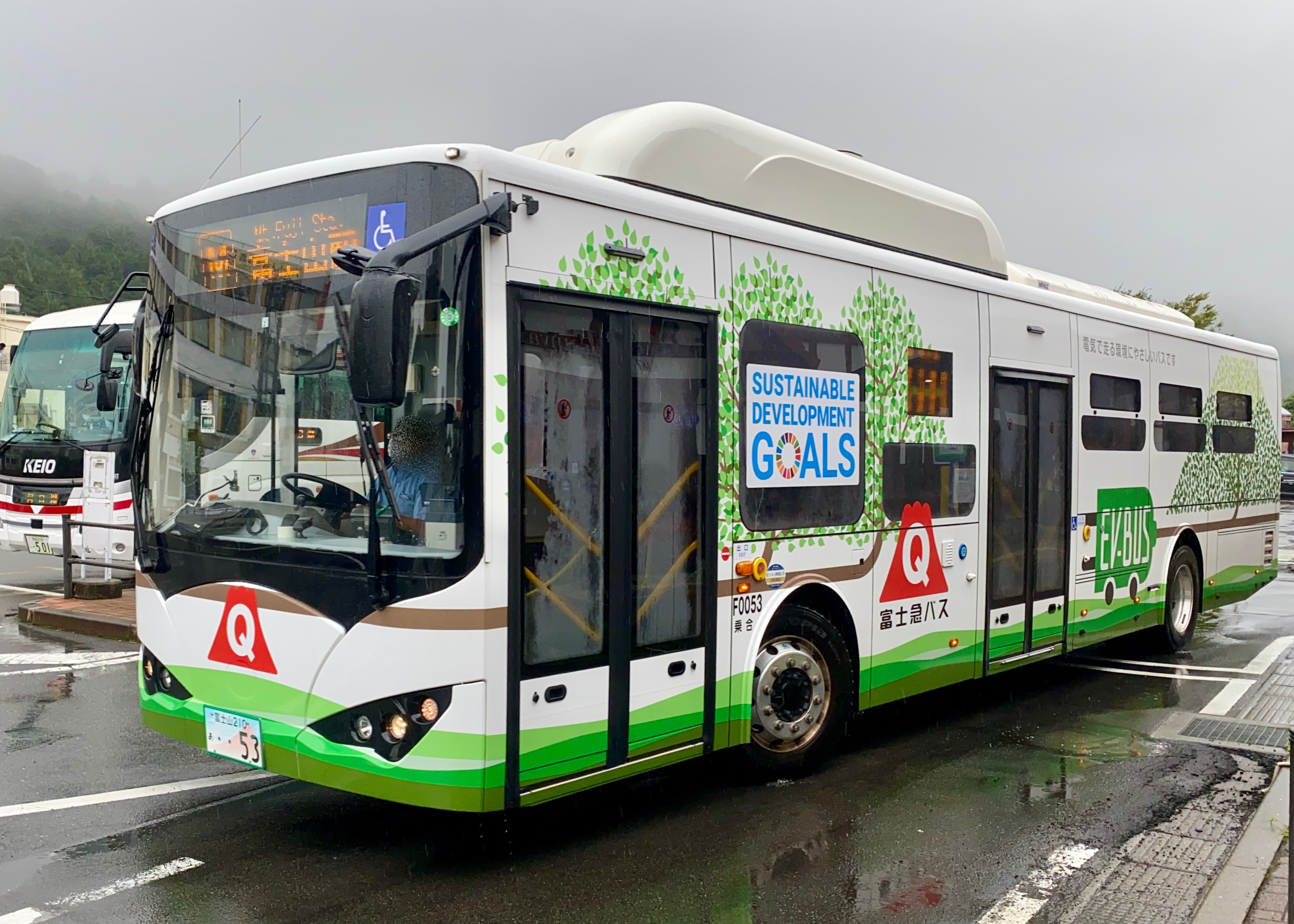
A BYD K9 in Japan.

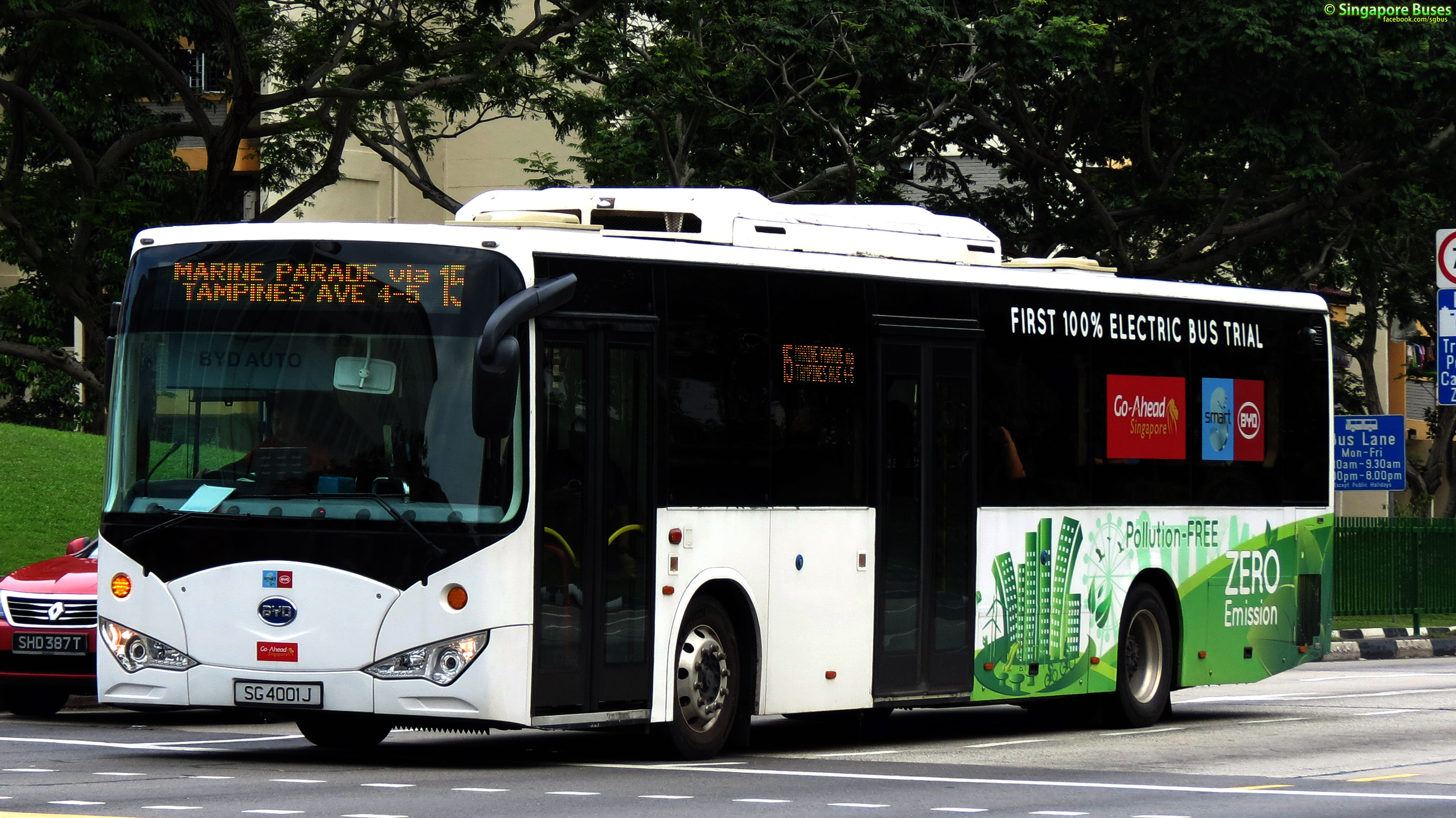
A BYD battery-run electric bus operated by Go-Ahead Singapore. It ran as part of a trial from November 2016 til May 2017.

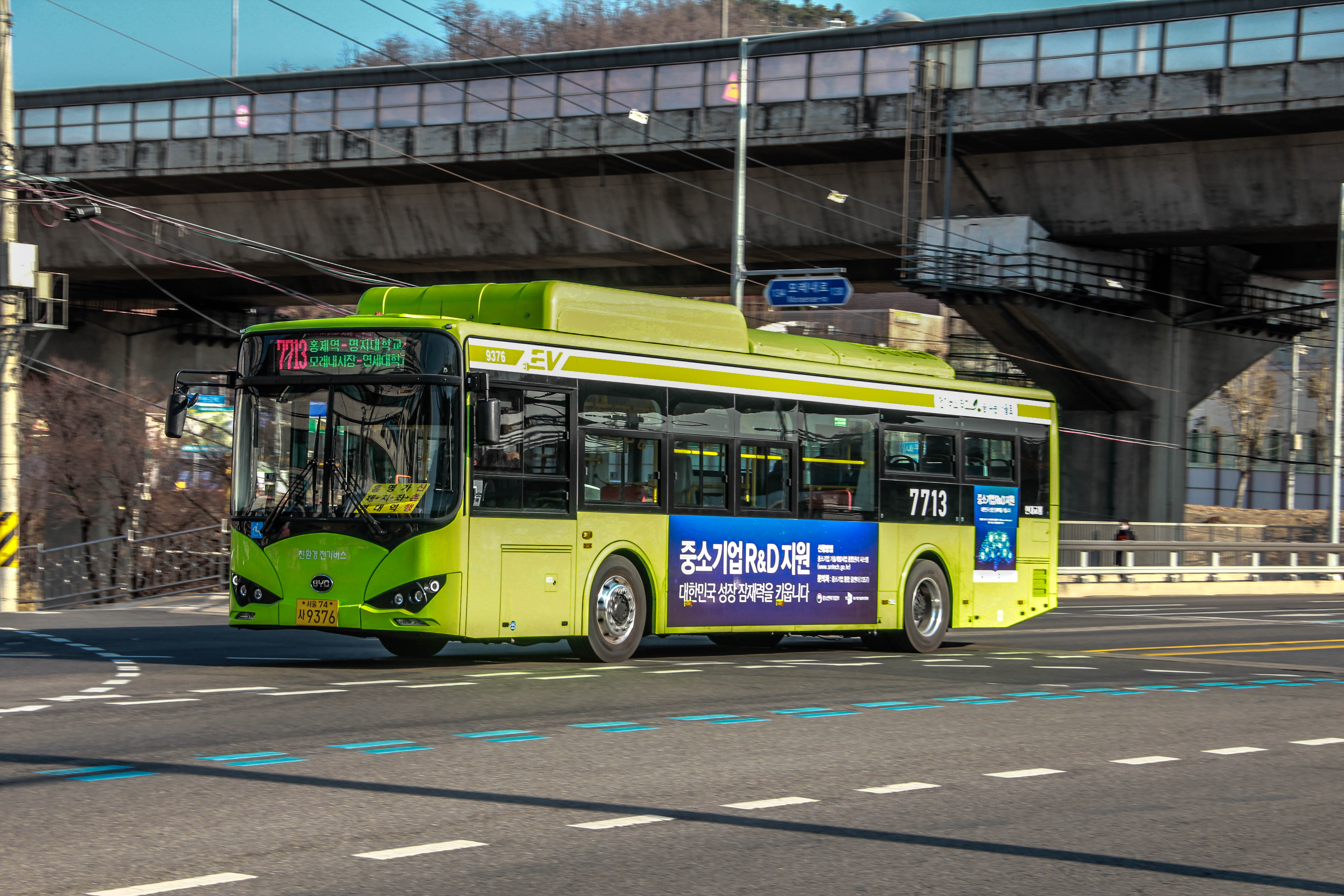
A Korean registered BYD K9 on service 7713

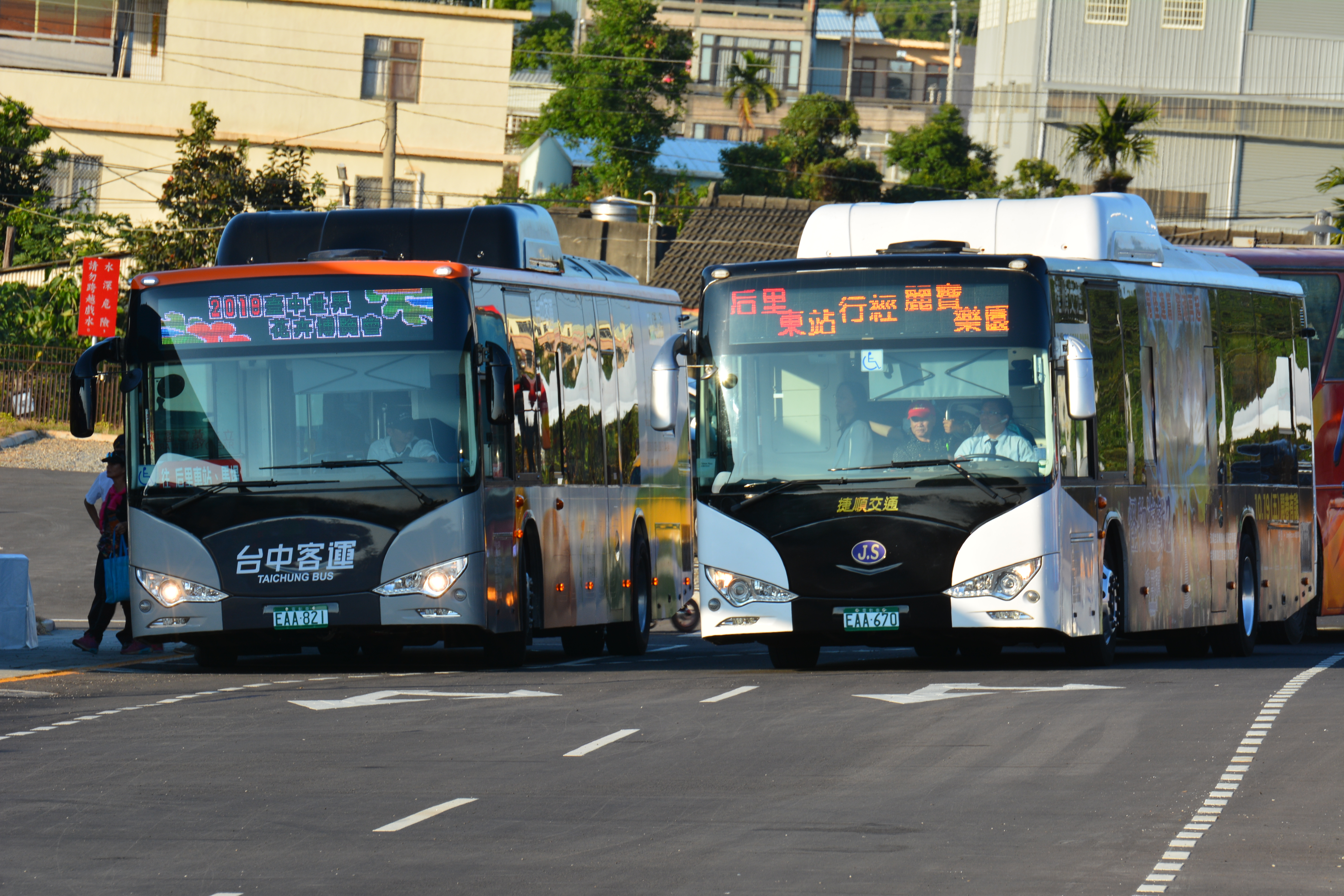
Two BYD K9s in Taiwan.

- Hong Kong: In July, 2011, the BYD Hong Kong Research and Development Center opened with a group of six engineers, in cooperation with its existing development team. The Kowloon Motor Bus fleet reportedly ordered 10 buses from BYD. The first unit arrived in September 2012. The public transit service planned to test the units on three transmit lines. The Kowloon Motor Bus BYD bus was eventually returned to BYD. However, KMB ordered 10 BYD K9R with Gemilang body and delivered in 2017. Long Win Bus ordered 4 BYD K9R with Gemilang body and delivered in 2017. Citybus and NWFB ordered 5 BYD K9R Electric buses from BYD Auto of China.
- India:
  - In December 2013, Bangalore Metropolitan Transport Corporation planned to start a three-month test of a K9. Even Pune has a few of these buses.
  - In 2018 June 18 Kerala State Road Transport Corporation started trial run in Trivandrum city.
  - Kadamba Transport Corporation, in Goa, took the delivery of thirty Olectra-BYD K9 electric buses, assembled by Olectra (MEIL), in April 2021. Twenty more electric buses were delivered in December 2021.
- Indonesia:
  - In April 2019, TransJakarta took pre-trial on some electric buses company, including BYD K9 and C6.
  - In July 2020, TransJakarta took trial run on K9 and C6 for public with free of charge for three months.
  - In March 2022, Mayasari Bakti operates 30 units for TransJakarta in non-BRT routes
- Japan: In February 2015, Kyotokyukou Bus Inc. of Kyoto, Japan, took delivery of five BYD electric buses, making BYD the first Chinese auto company to enter the Japanese market.
- Malaysia: In February 2014, BYD won the bid to supply 15 buses to Rapid Bus, a Prasarana Malaysia subsidiary. Rapid Bus will be using the 15 electric buses as shuttle buses on Kuala Lumpur's first BRT line on elevated guideway exclusively for electric buses namely BRT Sunway Line. It is world's first all-electric Bus Rapid Transit system. Since April 2022, some of the buses are also used at normal bus routes.
- Philippines: In May 2018, BYD announced it will deliver ten buses to the Philippines. It will be available through the official Philippine distributor Columbian Motors Corporation (CMC) sales network.
- Singapore:
  - Go-Ahead together with Land Transport Authority delivered the first BYD fully electric bus. It will undergo vigorous testing and be put to service for trial runs for six months. Registered as SG4001J, the bus made its debut on 7 November 2016 on route 17. After that, it went on hiatus, before coming back on route 119 on February.
  - In 2019, the Land Transport Authority of Singapore ordered 20 BYD K9 with Gemilang Coachwork bodywork. An initial five entered service on 29 July 2020, with all remaining buses entering service by November 2020. These buses are deployed on routes 76, 135, 162, 162M, 265, 807, 807A and 807B. The fleet of BYD K9 buses are operated solely by SBS Transit, based at Seletar Bus Depot (SEDEP). These 20 BYD K9 units share design similarities with the Singapore's BYD C6 minibuses operated by private bus companies; and Malaysia's BYD K9 buses operated by Rapid Bus in Kuala Lumpur.
  - In May 2022, BYD offered a Gemilang-bodied BYD K9RC double decker bus to the Land Transport Authority as part of a trial. It was registered as SG4005Z and entered revenue service on 4 July 2022 with SBS Transit. Also based at Seletar Bus Depot (SEDEP), SG4005Z was deployed on routes 800 and 851 before being de-registered in 2023; then after being scrapped for the post-trial.
- South Korea: In September 2020, BYD won an order for 18 units in the electric bus supply business for Seoul city buses. Delivery started from December 2020.
- Taiwan: BYD buses in Taiwan were manufactured by Kaison Green Energy.
- Thailand: On 2015, BYD will deliver K9RA buses. It will be available through the official BMTA has partnered with Loxley Plc.

=== Oceania ===
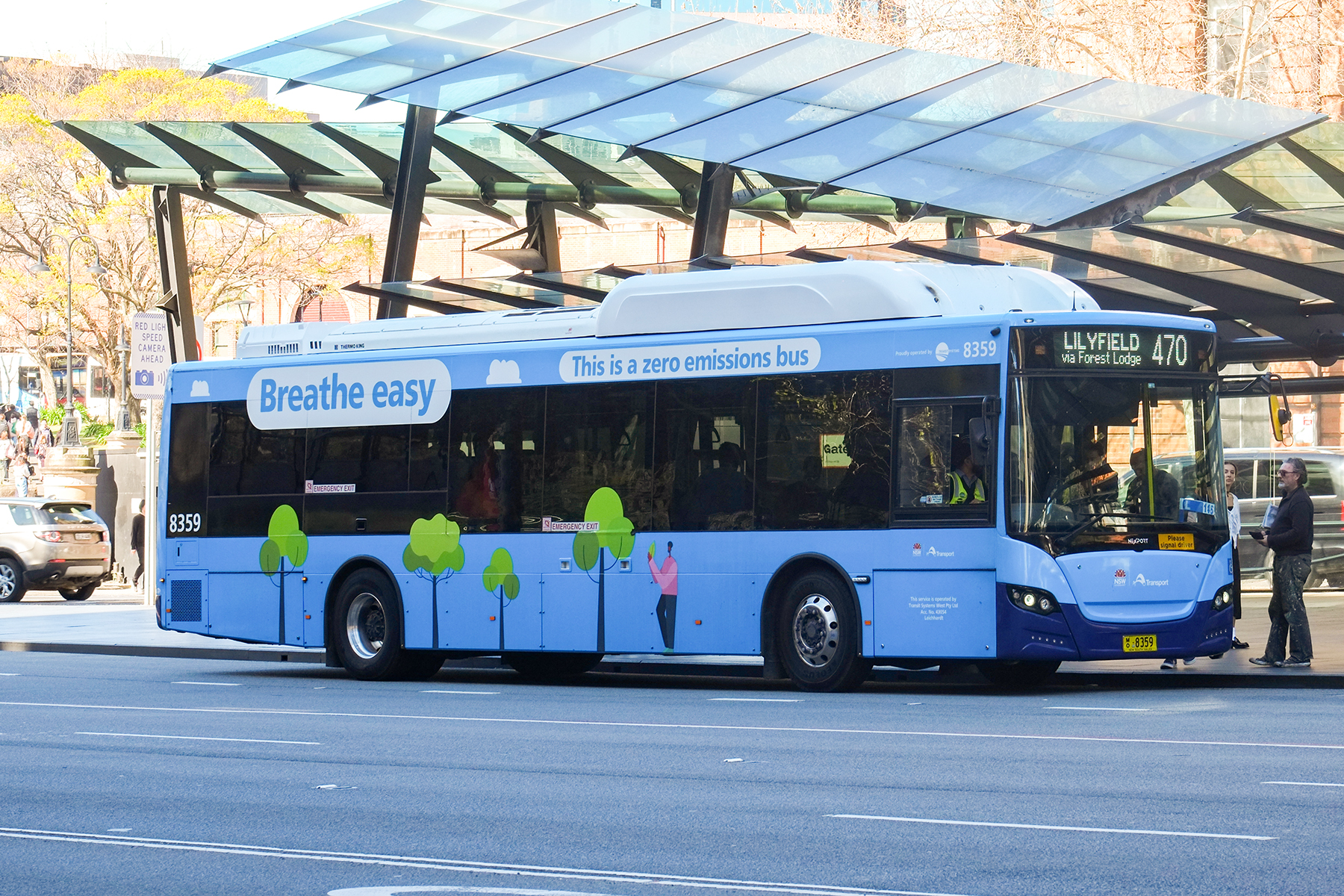
A BYD D9RA bus of Transit Systems NSW in Sydney

==== New Zealand ====
- NZ Bus is trialling a BYD eBus for up to three months in Auckland and Wellington from February 2017.

==== Australia ====
The BYD K9 is sold in Australia as D9RA with bodywork by Gemilang or Volgren.

- Brisbane: Brisbane Airport purchased several modified BYD K9 (with three doors) for shuttle service between domestic and international terminals, starting from 2019.
- Sydney: Transport for NSW purchased BYD D9RAs with Gemilang bodywork for numerous Sydney bus operators including:
  - Transit Systems NSW first delivered in July 2019, by 2025 they operate 50 D9RAs at multiple depots
  - Busabout Sydney 5 buses entered service in 2021 (now operating with Transit Systems NSW and included in their count)
  - Punchbowl Bus Company 4 buses entered service in August 2021 (now operating with U-Go Mobility)
  - Transdev NSW took delivery of 2 D9RAs with Volgren "Optimus" bodywork in 2021 (now operating with CDC NSW)
- Melbourne: Beginning in 2022, as part of the Victoria State Government's Zero Emissions Bus trial, a number of Melbourne bus operators began adding BYD D9RAs with Volgren "Optimus" bodywork into their fleet. These include Kinetic Melbourne (37 buses), Ventura Bus Lines (27 buses) and Transit Systems Victoria (9 buses).

=== Middle East ===
- In August 2012, a contract for 700 electric bus delivery was completed between BYD and Israeli transit company Dan Bus. The first buses were expected to be deployed in 2012. Based on the market price of 2.1 million yuan (US$330,000), the contract is estimated to be worth 1.5 billion yuan (US$236.65 million). The contract was BYD's largest order to date from a public transport operator outside of China.

=== Europe ===
BYD electric bus has been tested in European countries including Denmark, Finland, Germany, Hungary, Italy, the Netherlands, Portugal and Spain in cities such as Bremen and Bonn, Helsinki, Coimbra, Amsterdam, Copenhagen, Milan, Madrid, Barcelona, Athens and Warsaw.

- Finland: on March 12, 2012, BYD and a Finland-based transportation company, Veolia Transport Finland Oy, reached an agreement for K9s for the Finnish capital city Helsinki. BYD's K9 buses were to undergo a three-year performance test under Finland's conditions of extreme cold.
- Germany: BYD signed a letter of intent with Frankfurt, Germany to supply three K9s and two charging stations by the end of the first quarter of 2012. The buses were to serve as shuttles at Frankfurt Airport and along public transportation routes. In October 2020, BYD supplied 22 of K9s for BOGESTRA and HCR in the city of Bochum, Gelsenkirchen and Herne.
- Hungary: Salgótarján one K9UB (out of service), Pécs ten pieces K9UB-DW, Miskolc ten pieces K9UD-LF
- Italy: in 2014, ATM, got two K9s for test the electric bus in Milan.
  In 2015, the Piedmont Region, issued the first Italian tender for full-size ebuses, won by BYD: in October 2017 the buses began operating, 20 buses were delivered to GTT for Turin city routes and 3 buses were delivered to SUN for Novara city routes.
  In 2018, 4 K9s and in 2021, a K7 were delivered to Busitalia Veneto, a FS Group company, respectively for the cities of Padua and Rovigo. In 2025, ANM Naples put into service 22 electric buses, including BYD K9UD models, as part of a fleet renewal plan funded by the PNRR.
- Netherlands: the island of Schiermonnikoog in the province of Friesland introduced six new, long-range, K9s in April 2013 after BYD scored the highest in meeting program goals and won an order for the six buses and a 15-year maintenance contract from a European open bid supported by four major bus manufacturers.
  35 BYD K9s are in service as airportbus between the terminal and B-gate's at Amsterdam Schiphol Airport since 2015. The busses are adapted for the airport use and charged via a solar powerstation at the airport.
  Several other public transport authorities throughout the Netherlands have BYD K9s on order. In 2020 250 BYD K9s started operating in the eastern Netherlands, it is the largest electric bus fleet in Europe that was implemented overnight.
- Poland: In 2013 the capital city of Poland, Warszawa (Warsaw), tested K-9. BYD claims about 3 hours of charging time were not confirmed: the minimum was over 5 hours. 250 km range was found, less than the required 350 km. Also, the same buses were tested in Kraków.
- Spain: A successful two-week road test of BYD electric bus was conducted by the two main Spanish municipal public transportation companies: EMT (Madrid) and TMB (Barcelona).
- United Kingdom: In 2013 two units began operating on two central London routes; said to be the capital's first fully electric buses. Transport for London planned to purchase six more BYD buses in 2014. In July 2015, Go-Ahead London confirmed they would order 51 BYD electric buses with Alexander Dennis Enviro200 MMC bodywork. In March 2016, the first of a fleet of 5 double decker electric buses was launched by Metroline with an extended range of 190 miles. In 2016, Nottingham Community Transport received a batch for the park and ride services.
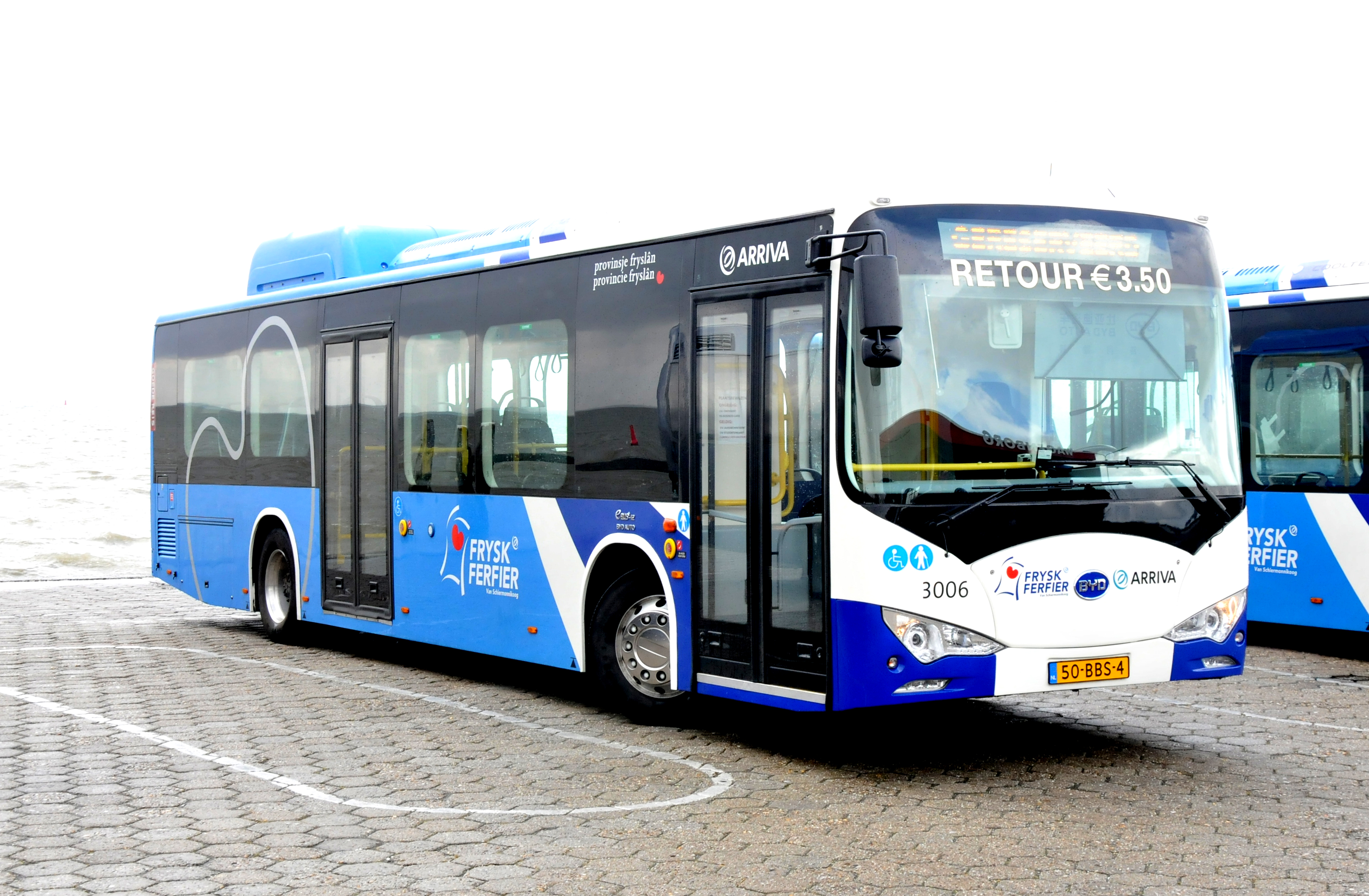
BYD electric bus on the Dutch island of Schiermonnikoog.

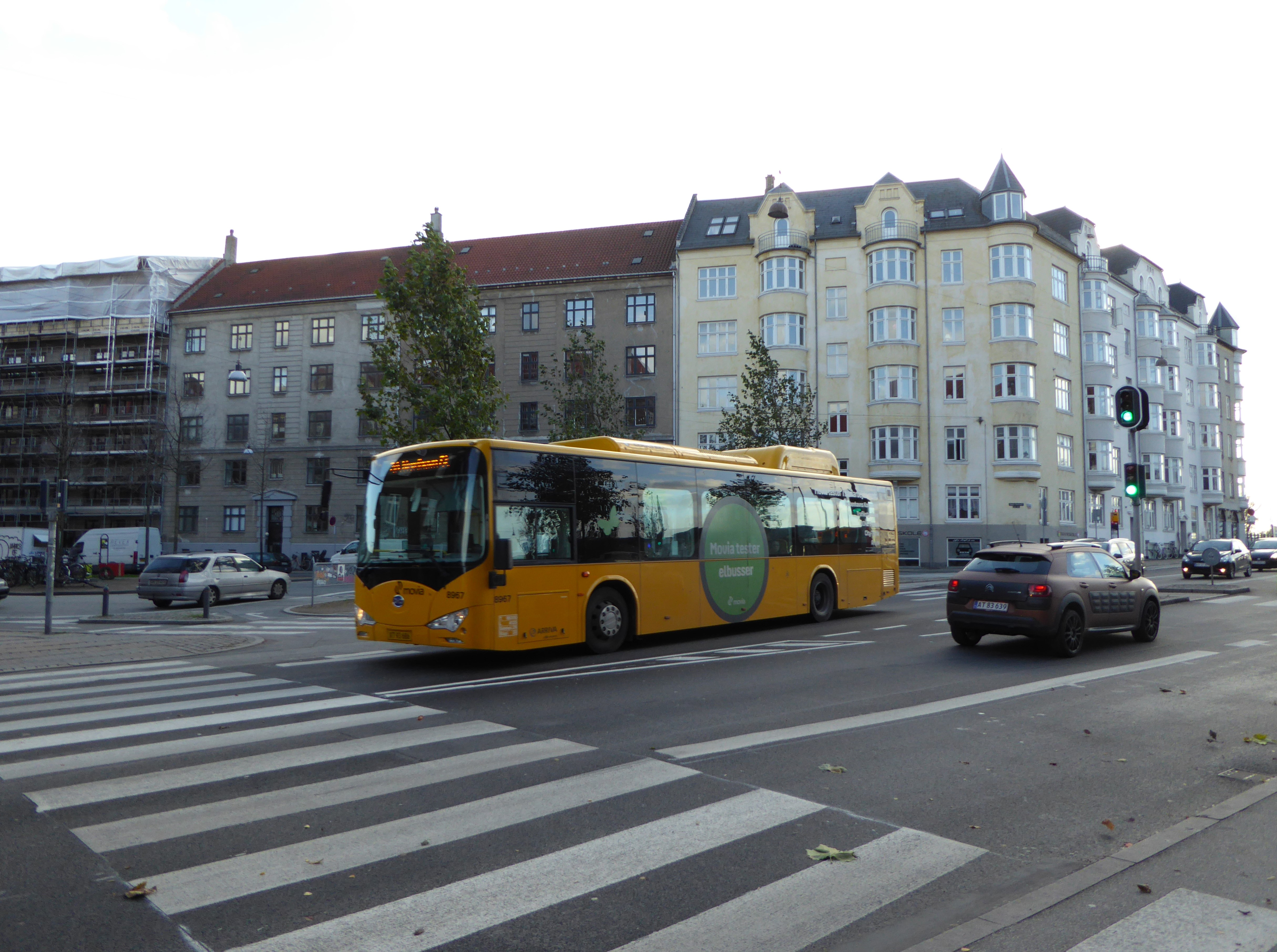
Movia bus line 3A on Enghavevej at Sønder Boulevard in Vesterbro in Copenhagen.

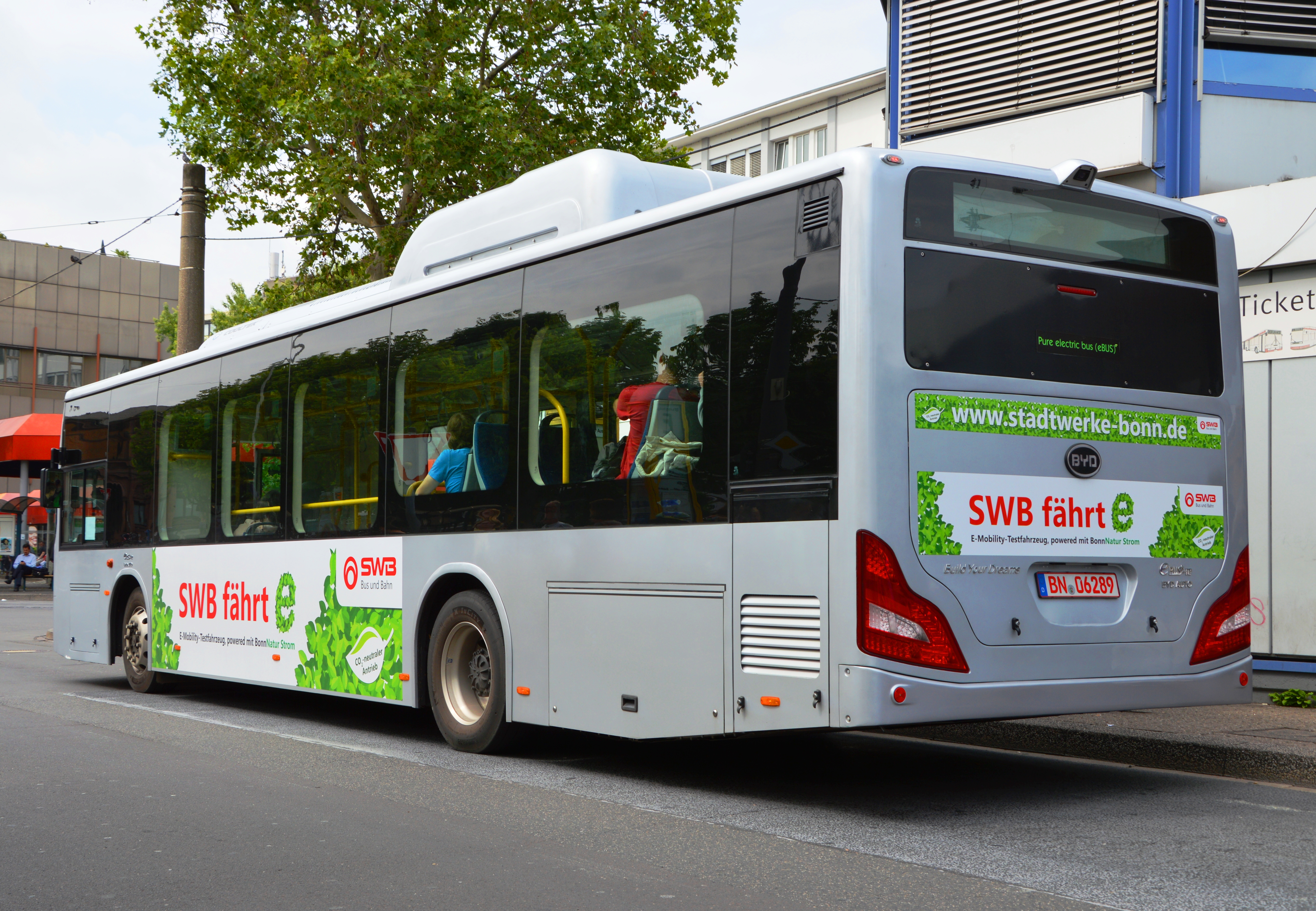
BYD electric bus test vehicle in Bonn, Germany.

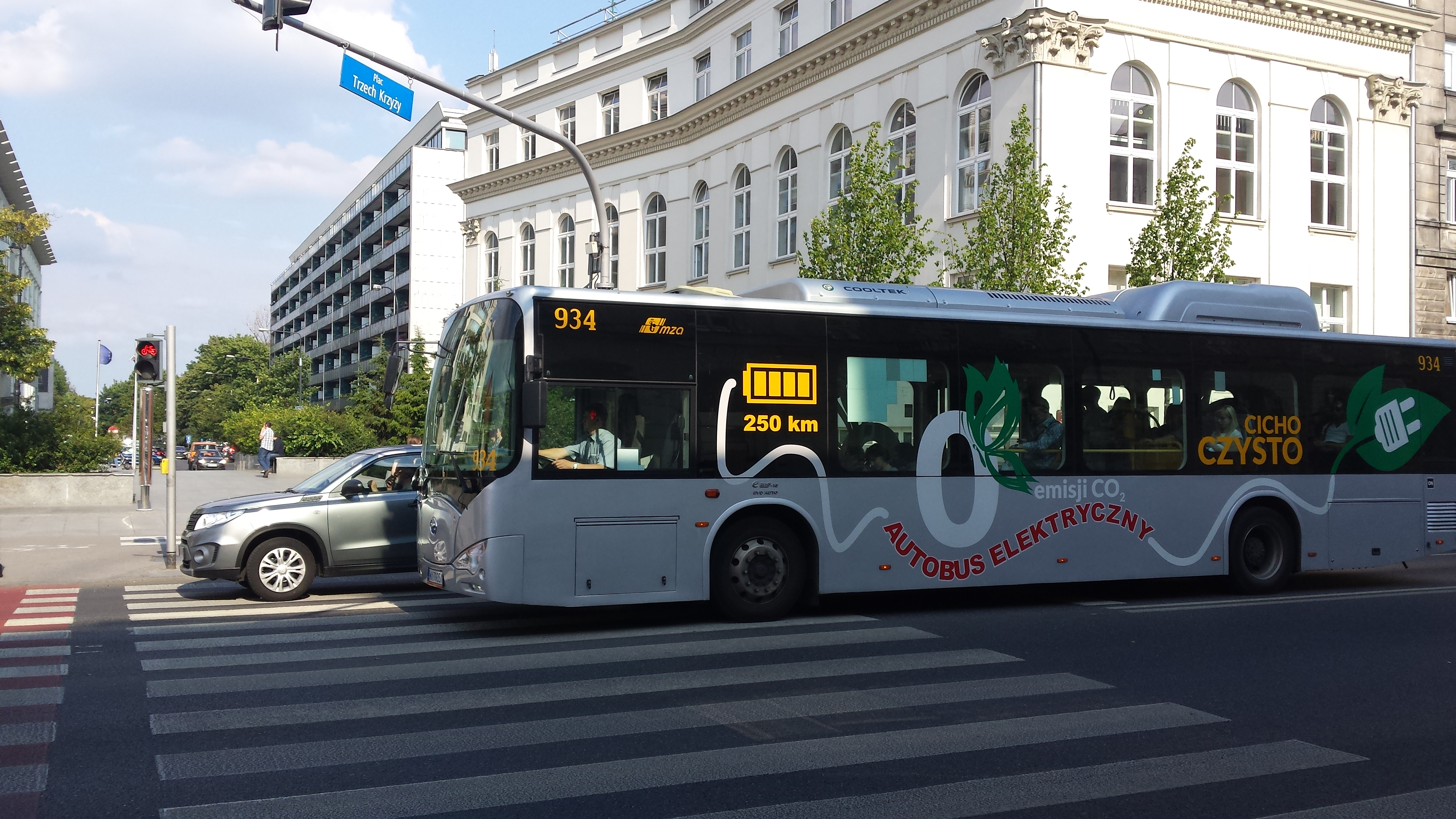
BYD bus in Warsaw on Ujazdowskie Avenue.

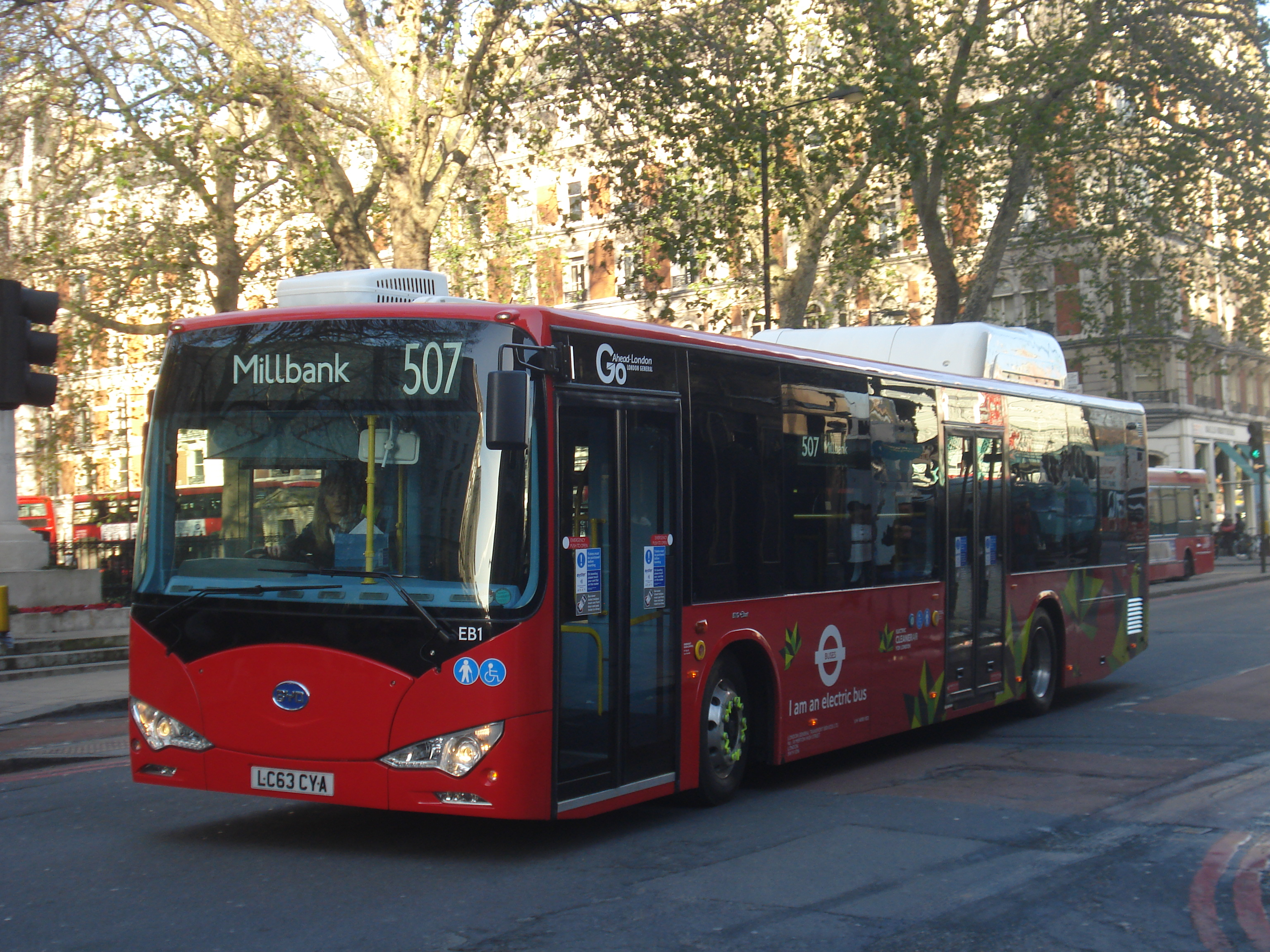
London General BYD electric bus at Victoria.

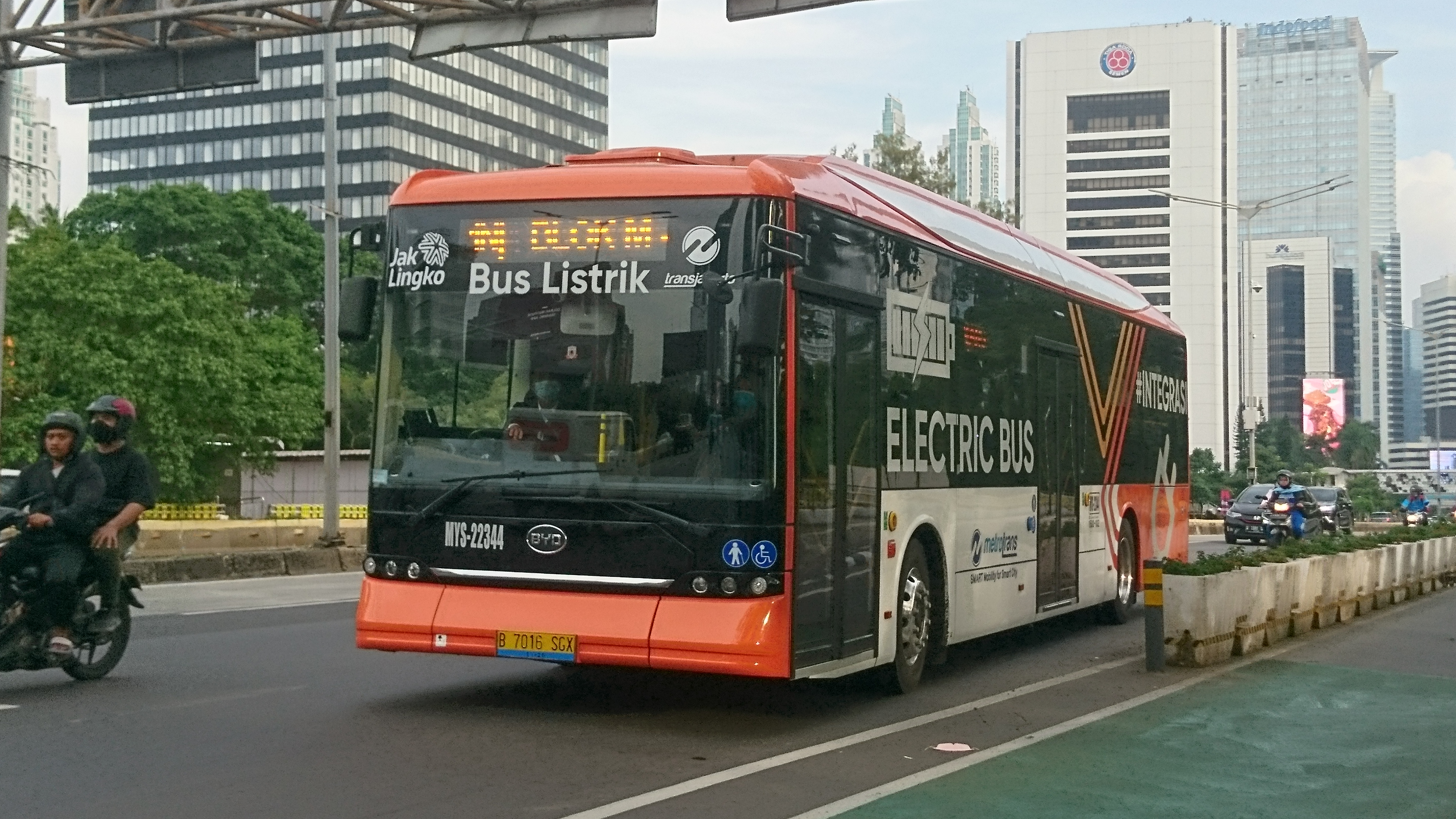
TransJakarta BYD K9 with B series bodywork in Central Jakarta

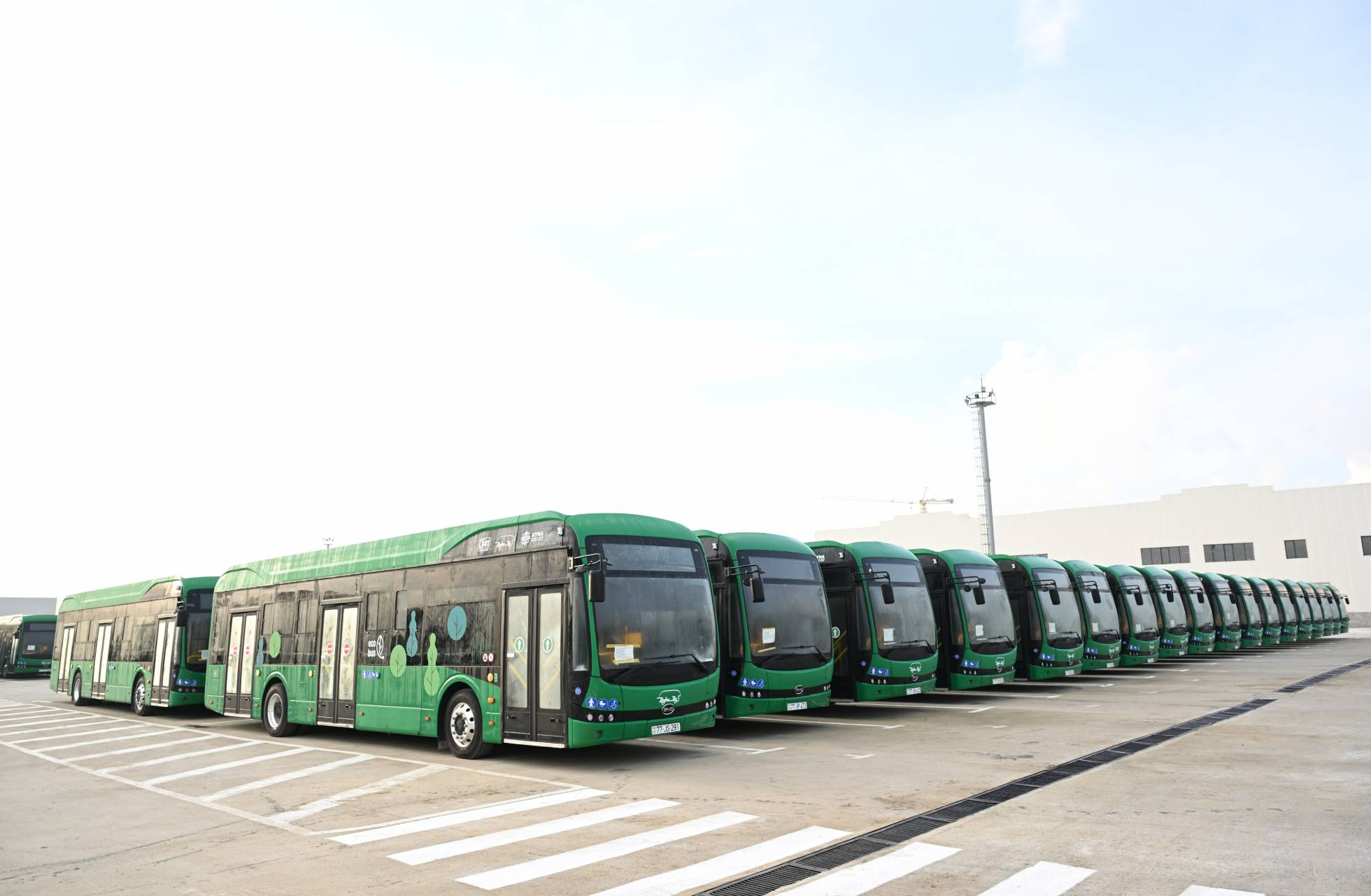
BYD K9UB Electric Buses in Baku, Azerbaijan.

=== Africa ===
- Kenya: In 2022 BYD shipped 17 K6 buses to Kenya and were deployed for use in Nairobi after they were leased to local bus companies in Nairobi via BasiGo.
- Mauritius: In 2022 a K6 bus landed in Port Louis and used for public transport in Mauritius through the National Transport Committee.
- Egypt: BYD came to an agreement to supply 15 K9 buses to be used for public transport in Alexandria.

== Competitors ==
North America:

- ENC Axess-BEB: Full-sized rigid bus
- Gillig Low Floor: Mid- and full-sized rigid buses
- GreenPower Motor Company EV250, EV350, and EV550: Mid- and full-sized rigid single- and double-deck buses
- New Flyer Xcelsior CHARGE: Full-sized rigid and articulated buses
- Nova Bus LFSe: Full-sized rigid and articulated buses
- Proterra Catalyst and ZX5: Full-sized rigid buses

Europe:

- Ikarus 120e
- Irizar i.e. bus and i.e. tram
- MAN Lion's City E
- Mercedes eCitaro
- Solaris Urbino 8,9 LE electric
- Solaris Urbino 12 electric
- Solaris Urbino 18 electric
- Volvo 7900 Electric
- Volvo BZL
- Volvo BZR
