= Haider Ali (artist) =

Pakistani Truck Artist

- Born: Karachi, Pakistan
- Notable work: Smithsonian Folklife Festival truck, Luton truck, Karachi Press Club mural

Haider Ali is a Pakistani painter best known for his work as a truck artist. Around the world, he has painted murals, structures, benches, and trucks in the distinctive truck art style of Pakistan. He first gained international attention in 2002 when he worked on the first authentic Pakistani truck in North America for the Smithsonian and has since exhibited at museums and institutions globally.

== Early life and education ==
Ali was born in Karachi, Pakistan to a family originally from Jalandhar in Punjab, British India, which moved to Lahore and Karachi before the partition of India. Ali received rigorous training in truck art as a child apprentice. He was trained from the age of eight by his truck artist father, Muhammad Sardar, who insisted on an ability to draw straight vertical and horizontal lines. By age 16, he had painted his first truck under master supervision.

He has taught at the Indus Valley School of Art and Architecture as a visiting faculty member.

== Method and style ==
On most projects, Ali blends his own set of visual vocabulary with imagery and motifs suggested by the client. In his Karachi workshop, he paints in the open air and sketches his ideas on the ground. If necessary, he has painted scenes that he has never personally seen, a task he enjoys. Ali will paint portraits of famous Pakistani political and cultural figures, which often appear on the rear of trucks. Upon request, he paints truck owner's children, a task he finds more challenging as the clients closely scrutinize the work. Ali appreciates the sentimental quality of truck art and believes that love is at the core of the art. According to Ali, truck art is to Pakistan what Bollywood is to India.

== Notable works ==
As part of the Smithsonian Folklife Festival in 2002, Ali painted a Bedford truck in Washington, DC. Jamal Uddin, another Pakistani artist, completed the body and metal work while Haider handled the painting. It is the only complete and authentic recreation of a Pakistani truck in North America and is noteworthy for conveying the totality of truck art, not reducing it to painting, metalwork, or other elements that are prized by elite art audiences.

In 2011, Ali also painted a truck in Luton, United Kingdom for a special Truck Art exhibition at the Stockwood Discovery Centre. Now part of the center's transport collection, the truck is only one of its kind in the U.K., and possibly Europe. Initiated as part of the festivities for London 2012, the project celebrated ties between Luton and Pakistan, as Bedford trucks manufactured in Luton in the 1950s are still used in Pakistan. Ali collaborated with 20 artists including Rory Coxhill, a British Gypsy artisan and folk wagon artist who apprenticed for eight weeks in Pakistan as part of the project.

In 2013, Ali visited Kolkata, India and decorated a truck as part of the city's Durga Puja annual celebrations in honor of the goddess Durga. With the help of two assistants, Ali painted a pandal, or one of the colorful religious structures used for the event. The pandal structure was designed to give visitors the feeling of standing in the cargo hold of a truck while the head of the truck, or taj, was used to hold the representations of the goddess. The installation was accompanied by a truck art exhibition introducing visitors to the art. Ali understood his participation as supporting India - Pakistan coexistence and friendship.

In 2014, as part of a fellowship at the USC Pacific Asia Museum, Ali painted a van as a gift to the university for their patronage. Ali included California references including the bear from the state of California flag bear, the Hollywood sign, a bald eagle, and ocean sunsets. His work was shown as part of the museum's exhibit, "From the Grand Trunk Road to Route 66," which linked the culture of travel in the US and Pakistan and the explosion of vehicular-related art in the 1950s.

Ali and his team painted a mural on the wall of the Karachi Press Club which features notable Pakistani women including Yasmeen Lari, Pakistan's first female architect and prominent activist Sabeen Mahmud. The work was commissioned as part of the I am Karachi campaign. It was the subject of local protests while it was being painted and later became a target of vandalism and graffiti. Ali restored the mural in 2017.

Ali has also drawn the mural of the man allegedly killed by police officers, in racial terrorism, George Floyd in Karachi, Sindh, Pakistan.
