= Horn OK Please =

Indian driving phrase

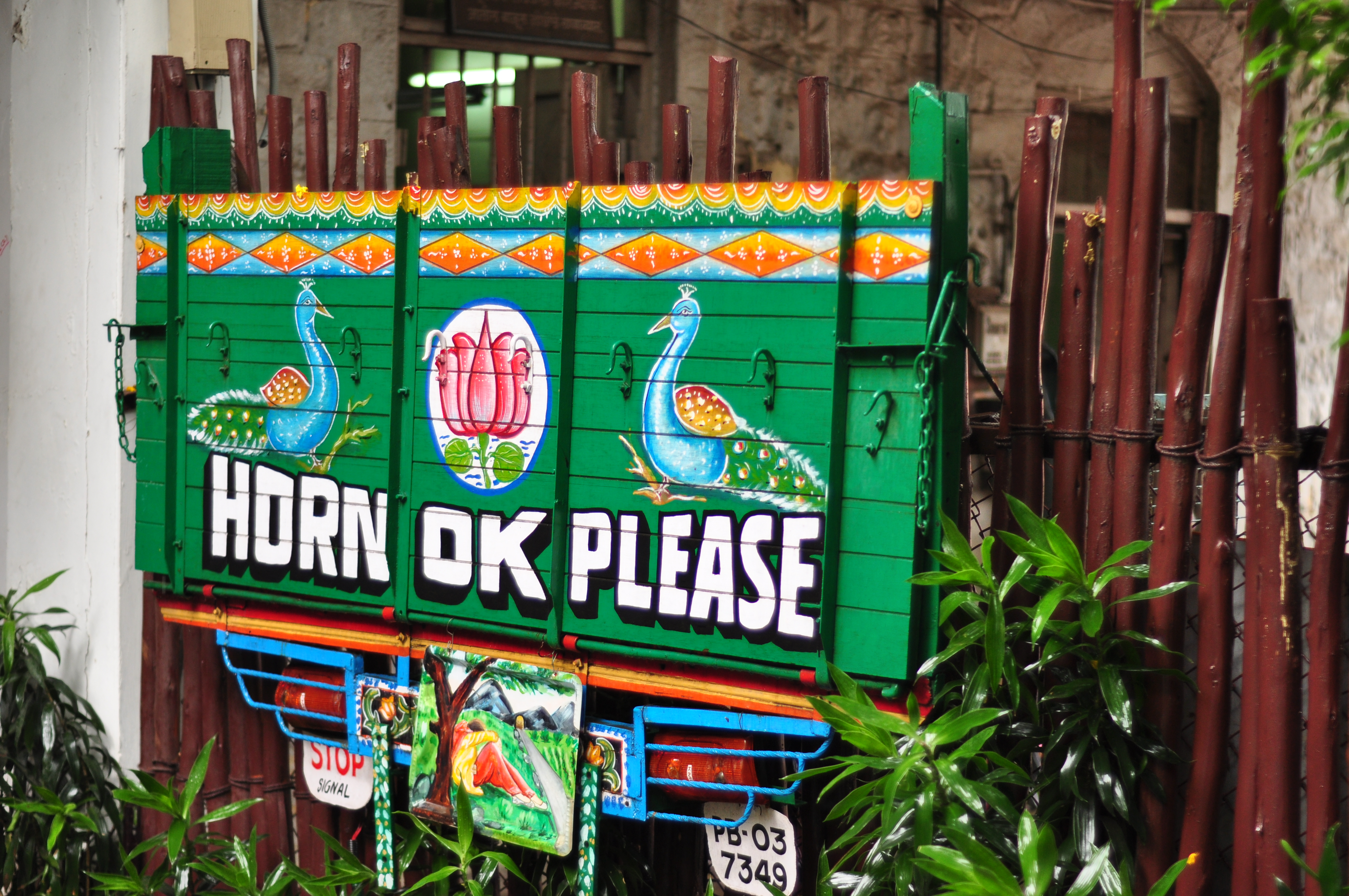
Horn Ok Please sign on a fence

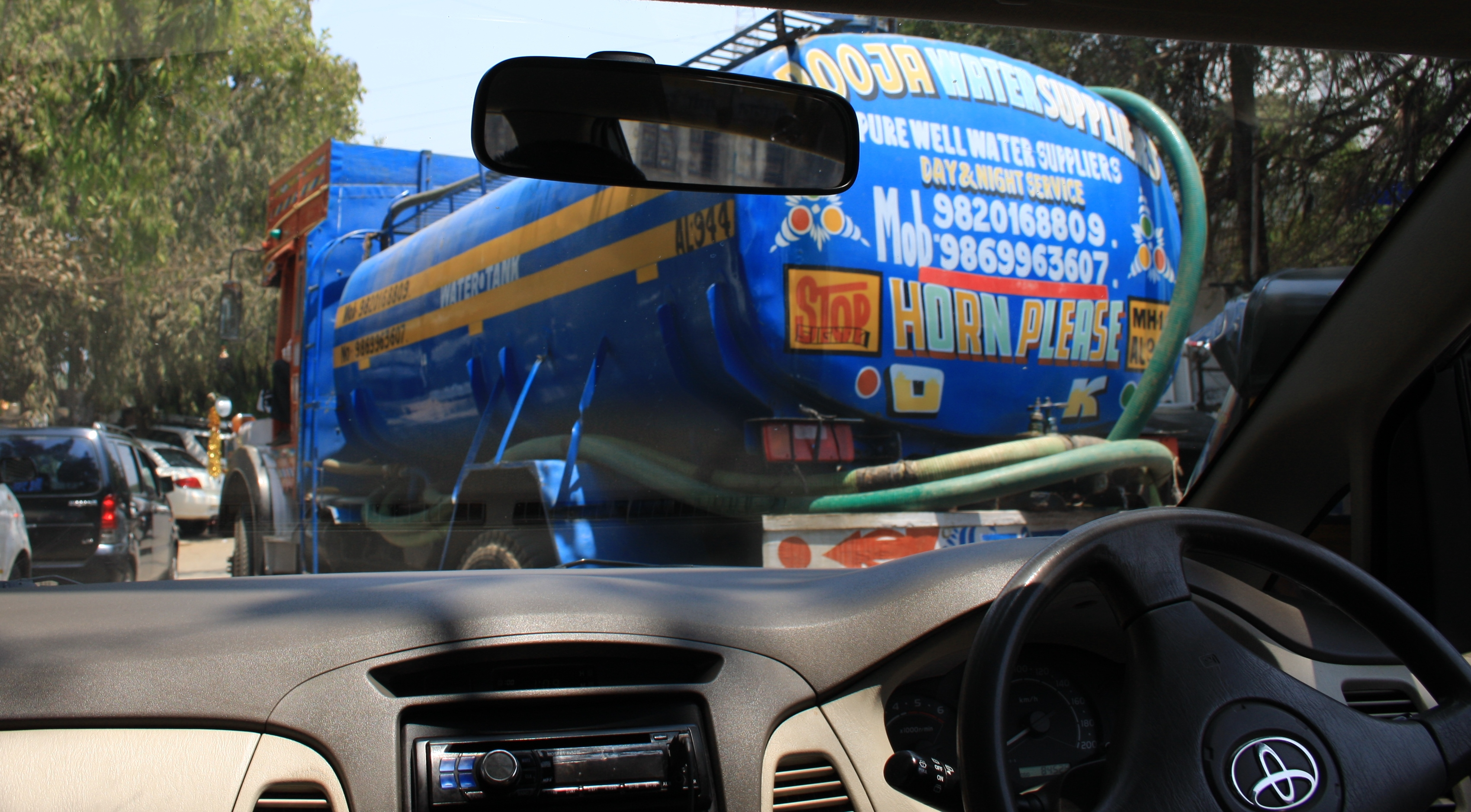
Horn OK Please sign on a truck in India.

Horn OK Please or Sound Horn is a phrase commonly painted on commercial vehicles like trucks, buses and local taxis in India, to alert drivers of vehicles approaching from behind to sound their horns if they wish to overtake. This phrase is often displayed using South Asian truck art.

On April 30, 2015, the Government of Maharashtra banned the use of "Horn OK Please" on the rear of commercial vehicles, on the grounds that it encouraged motorists to honk unnecessarily and caused noise pollution. In Maharashtra, such signage is a violation of Section 134 (1) of the Maharashtra Motor Vehicle Rules.

Bal Malkit Singh, former president of the All India Motor Transport Congress, welcomed the ban, stating that the phrase was required in the past when the roads were narrow; but that on modern wide roads and multi-lane highways, drivers could use lights and indicators to overtake other vehicles.

== See also ==
- Autorickshaw
- Indian English
- Truck art in India
