= Truck art in South Asia =

Decorated trucks in the Indian subcontinent

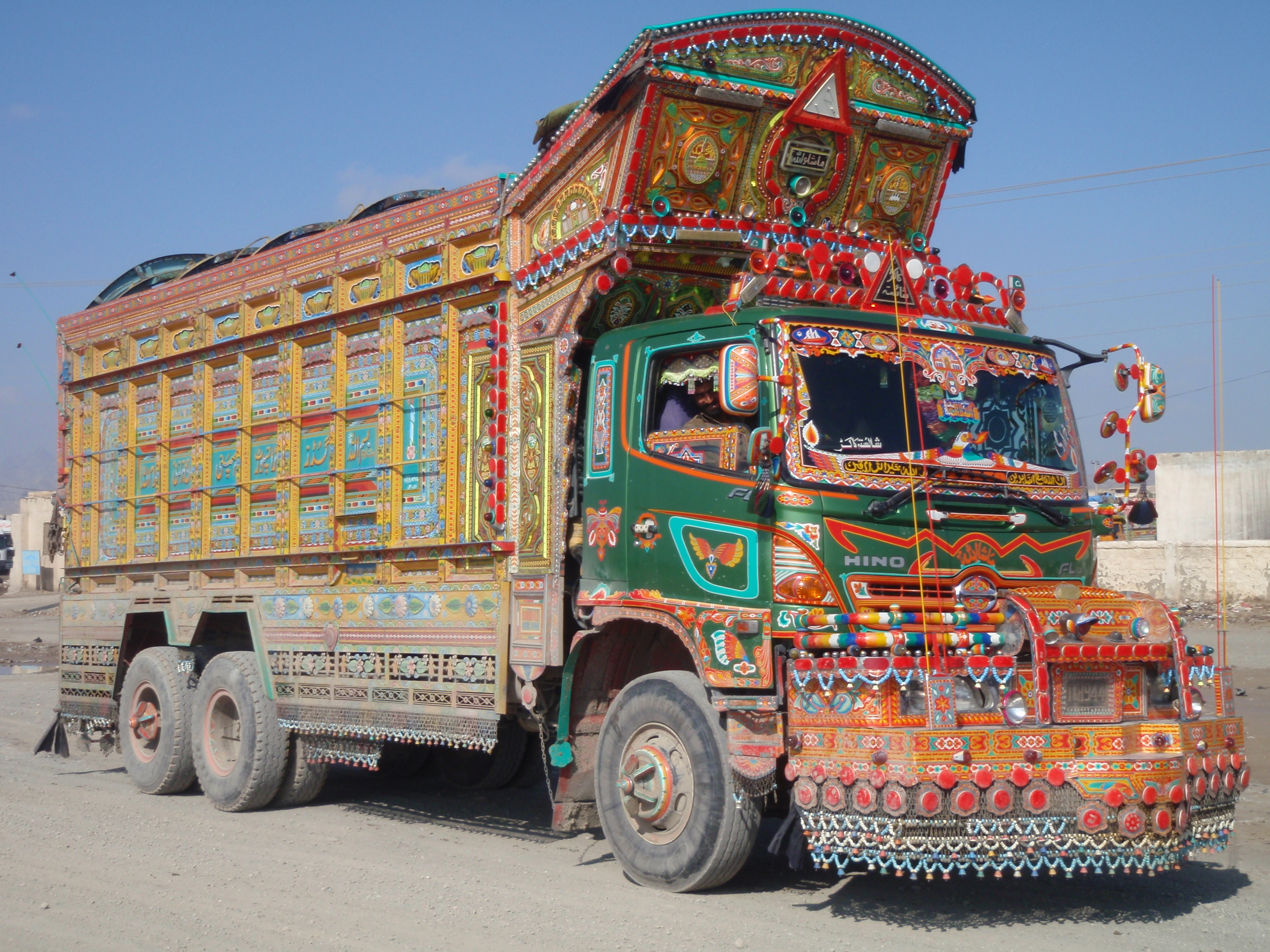
A typical decorated truck in Pakistan; most Pakistani trucks have an augmented rooftop to increase space for decoration

Truck art in South Asia is a popular form of regional decoration, with trucks featuring elaborate floral patterns and calligraphy. It is especially common in Pakistan and India.

During the War in Afghanistan, Pakistani decorated trucks that ran services between Pakistan and Afghanistan came to be known as jingle trucks by American troops and contractors who were deployed across the latter country.

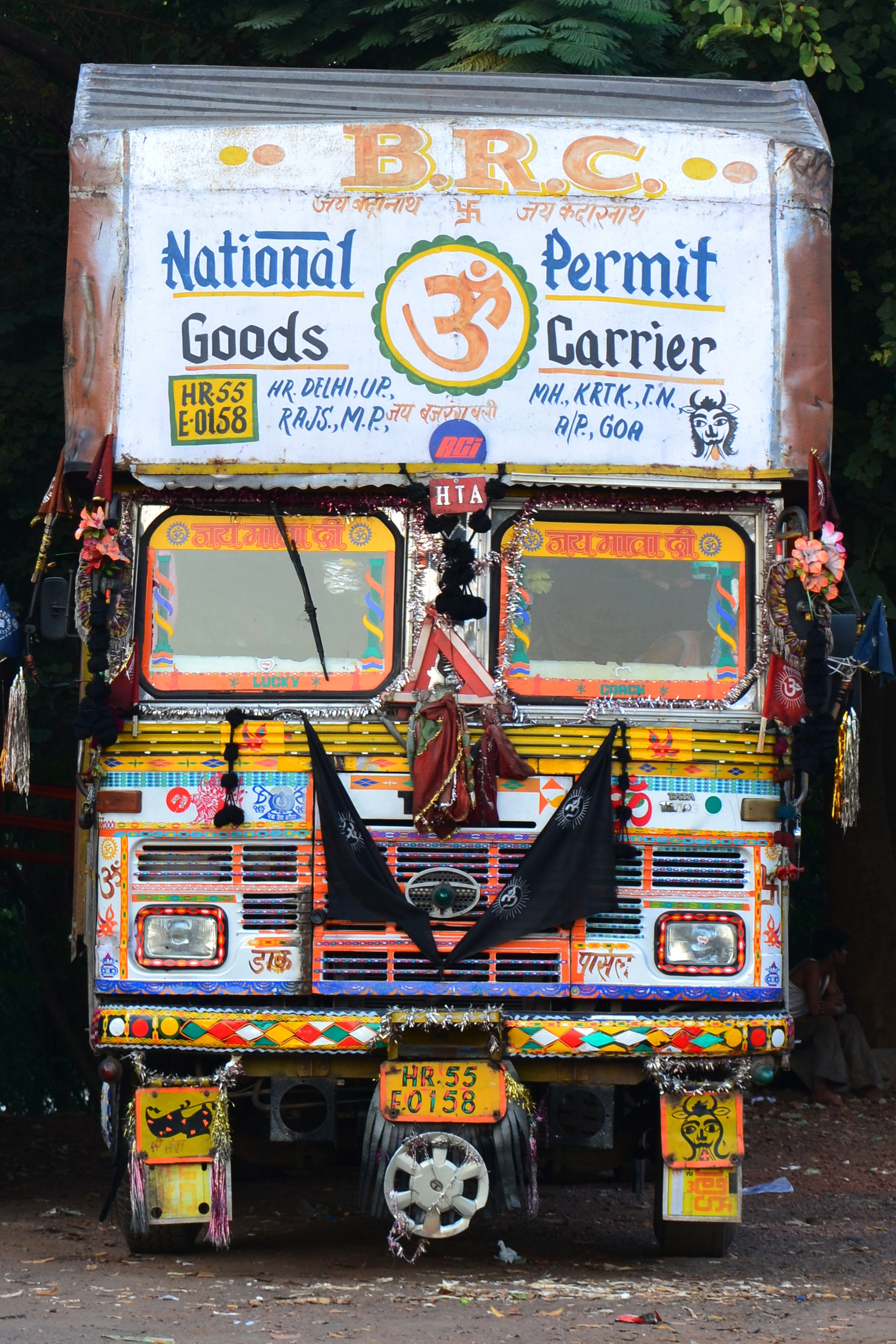
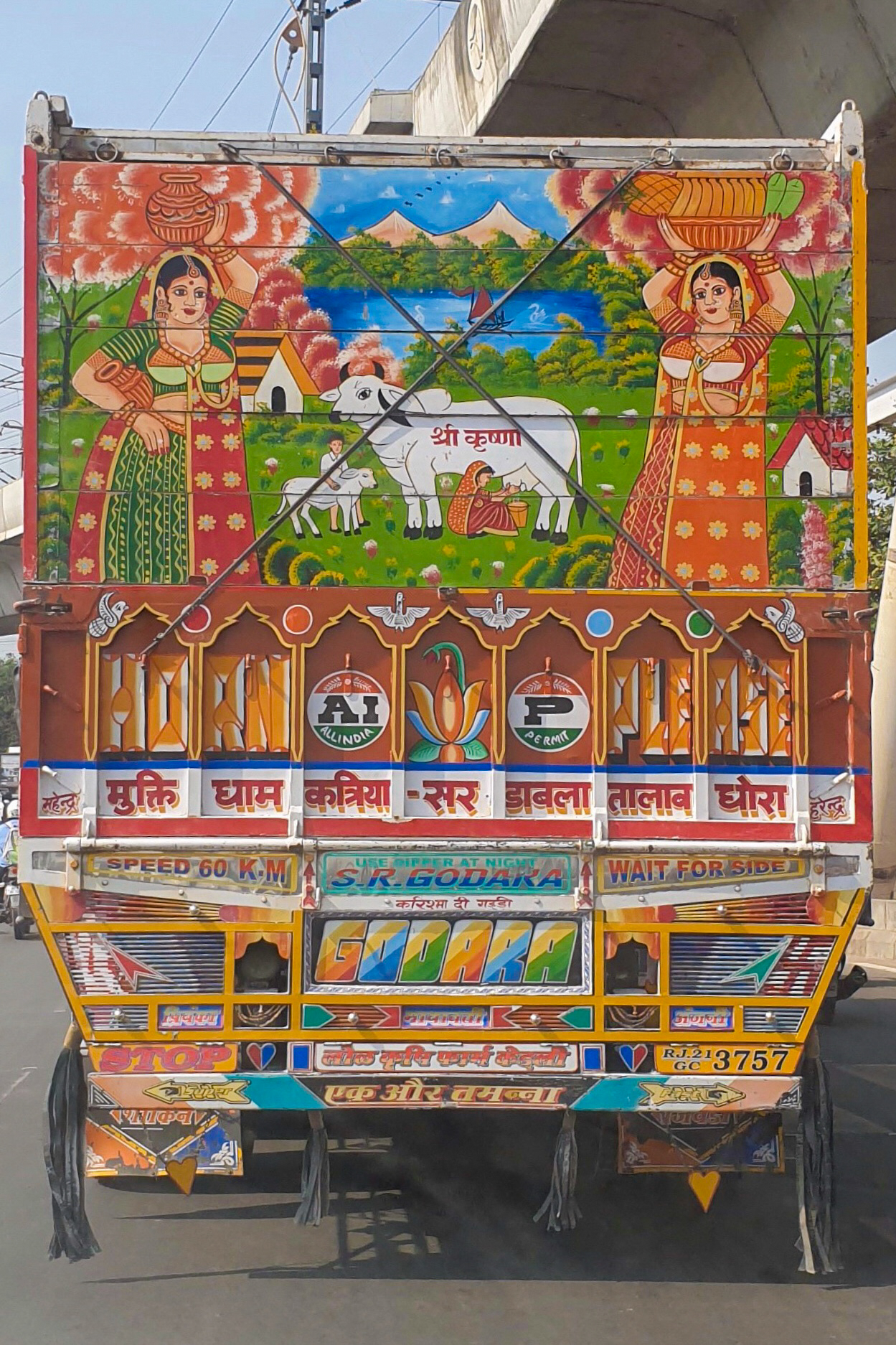
Front and rear view of two trucks in India, showing detail of various decorative symbols used in Indian truck art

== History and origin ==
The concept of South Asian truck art itself generally goes back to the 1920s during British rule in Colonial India, in which trucks were imported into the country. Locals began to decorate the trucks that arrived in colonial India using "kaleidoscopic age-old folk art" from the region. The tradition of truck art became "a tradition for generations of truck artists" in the Indian subcontinent.

The phrase Horn OK Please is often seen on trucks using the South Asian truck art form. During the World War II era, the abbreviation "OK" referred to the fact that the trucks were running on kerosene, a flammable fuel. The "OK" might be a reference to this.

The term "jingle truck" is military slang that was coined by American troops serving in Afghanistan, although it may also date back to the British colonial period. The term came to be because of the jingling sound that the trucks make due to the chains and pendants hanging from the bumpers of the vehicles.

== Practice ==
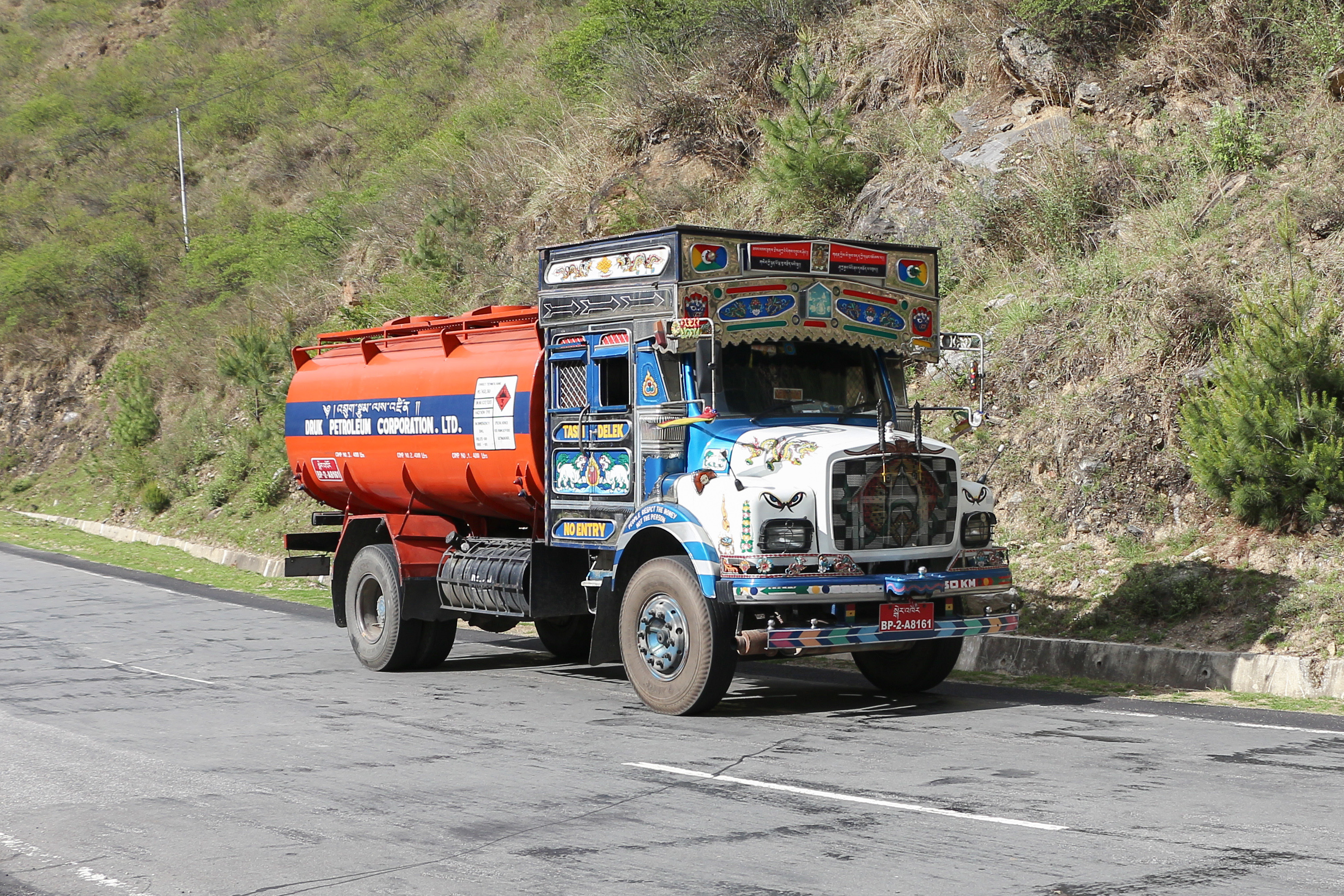
A tanker truck in Bhutan with Tibetan buddhist symbols like the snow lion used for decoration

Many trucks and buses are highly customized and decorated by their owners. External truck decoration can cost thousands of dollars. The decoration often contains elements that remind the truck drivers of home, since they may be away from home for months at a time. The art is a mode of expression for the truck drivers. Decoration may include structural changes, paintings, calligraphy and ornamental-decor like mirror work on the front and back of vehicles and wooden carvings on the truck doors. Depictions of various historical scenes and poetic verses are also common. Outfitting is often completed at a coach workshop. Chains and pendants often dangle off the front bumper. Religious iconography, poetry and political logos are also common.

=== India ===
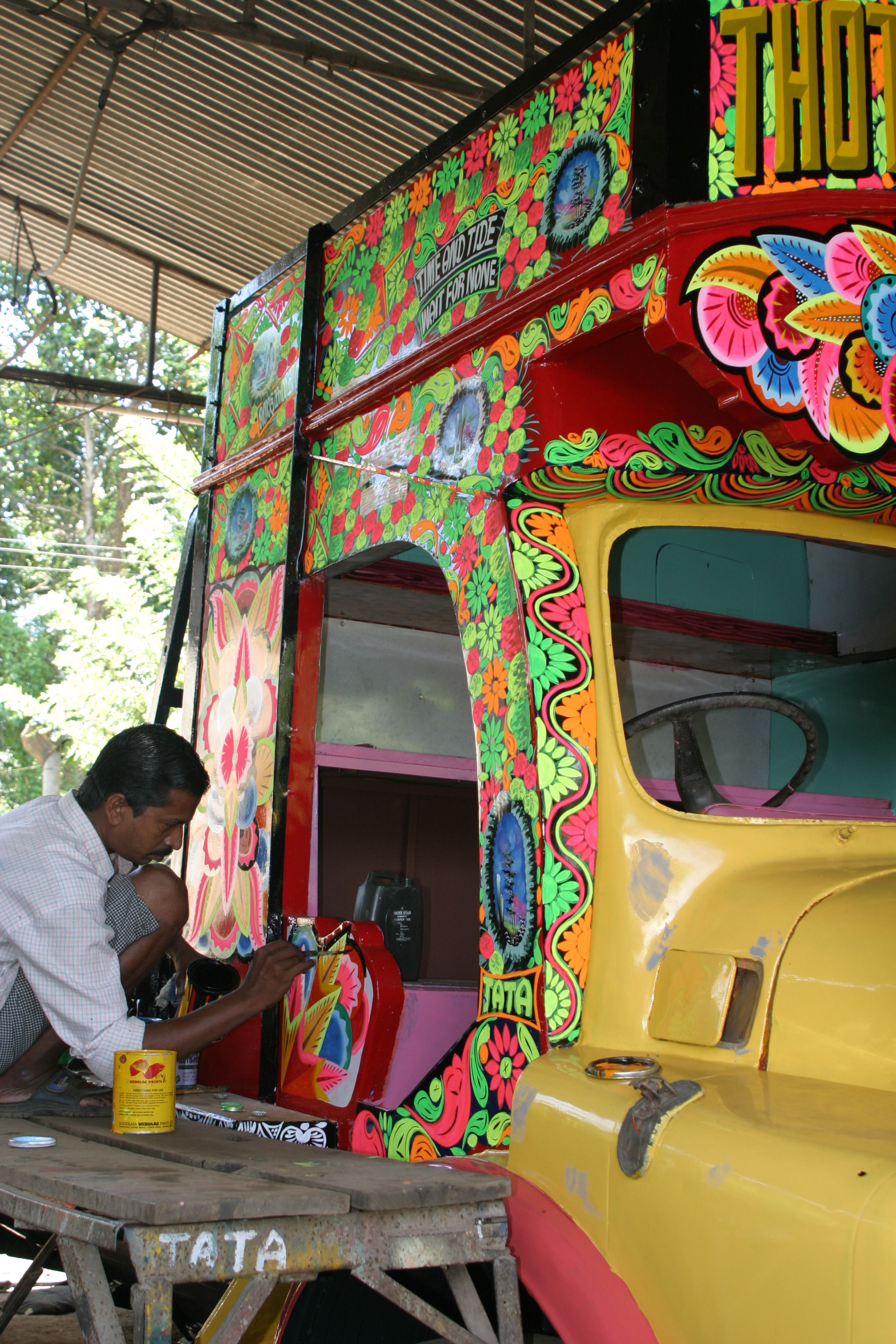
Truck being painted in Kochi, India

==== Themes ====
In India, motifs depicting eagles, kites, cow nuzzling calf and nazar battu, and catchphrases like "Horn OK Please", "Blow Horn" and "Use Dipper at Night" are frequently seen.

==== Artists ====
Nafees Ahmad Khan, a truck art artist in Indore, is well known throughout India and has been designing one truck every day for over thirty-two years.

==== Regional styles ====
In India, the Delhi-based artist Tilak Raj Dhir states that the slogans he adds to his truck art, which is prevalent throughout the National Capital Region, often change with the socio-political atmosphere. The state of Punjab is considered a major centre of truck art in India, with a distinctive style and expert artists. Poetry is commonly seen in truck art across northern India, and particularly in Uttar Pradesh. Truck art in Hindi and Urdu is sometimes called Phool Patti.

=== Pakistan ===
==== Themes ====
Truck art showcases a wide variety of symbols, from religious (mostly Islamic) motifs, poetic calligraphy and folklore to political messages and regional identity. These traditional symbols evolve as artisans apply their decorative techniques with modern mediums. Themes in the art draw heavily from indigenous artistic traditions while working in modern pop cultural and political elements. The result is a layered dialogue between heritage and modernity.

==== Artists ====
Truck art has been called a "big business" in Pakistan, with around 250,000 people employed in the major centers as of 2014; one of the most prominent truck artists is Haider Ali. Trained by his father from his youth, he first came to international attention in 2002 when he painted a Pakistani truck as part of the Smithsonian Folklife Festival. Mr. Syed Phool Badshah, also known as Phool ji, is a well-known truck artist who is best known for his unique style of doing Fine Arts with Truck art.

==== Regional styles ====
General Motors introduced trucks to Karachi in the 1930s and by the time of the partition of India, it had become the hub of truck art within what became Pakistan, with people moving to the city for work. Though Karachi is a major city centre for truck art, though there are other hubs in Rawalpindi, Swat, Peshawar, Quetta and Lahore. The Karachi style has been called "disco art", with flashing bulbs, glass and mirrors. Trucks from Balochistan and Peshawar are often heavily trimmed with wood, while trucks from Rawalpindi and Islamabad often feature plastic work. Camel bone ornamentation and predominance of red colours is commonly seen on trucks decorated in Sindh. In Sindh, truck art is not exclusive to trucks only, but it is also used in local rickshaws, vans, wagons, bikes, busses, etc.

== Influence ==
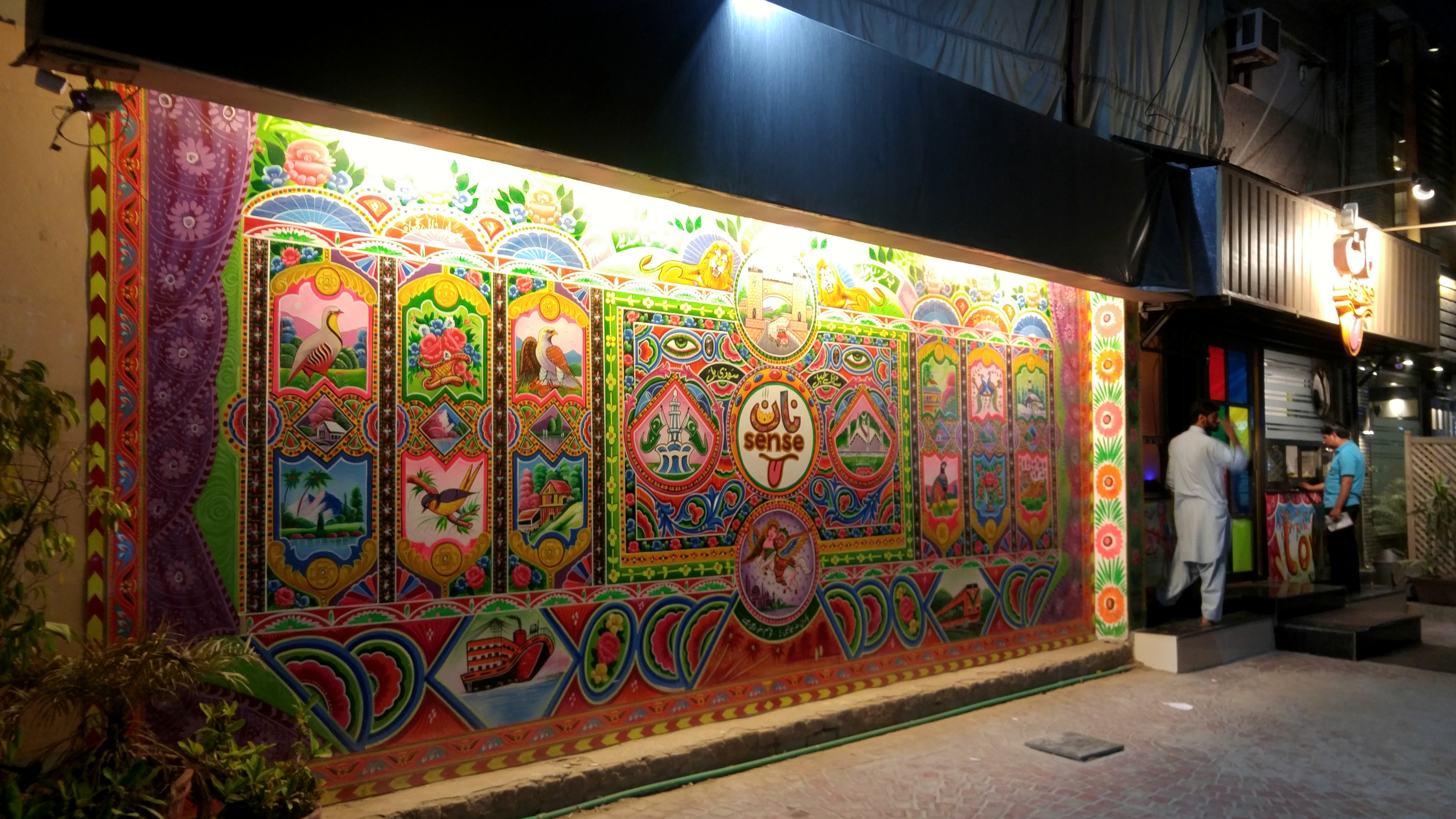
Truck art decorates the façade of a business in Peshawar, Pakistan.

Truck art has extended beyond the decoration and ornamentation of trucks into other forms and media.

=== Cars ===
Though cars are not traditionally decorated in South Asia, there are examples of cars embellished in a truck art style. In 2009, The Foxy Shahzadi, a 1974 VW Beetle decorated in a truck art style, travelled from Pakistan to France in a 25-day journey. In the Indian city of Mumbai, some drivers decorate their taxis in a truck art style.

=== Buses ===
The buses in Asia are decorated with paintings that blend spiritual images with nature motifs. In Pakistan, these buses and trucks feature folk art. The so-called "jingle trucks" of Pakistan showcase this art tradition all over the country. Each vehicle displays complex designs and patterns, made by local artisans.

=== Fashion ===
The lively colours of Pakistani trucks have inspired some fashion designers. The Italian fashion company Dolce & Gabbana used truck art-inspired displays in a 2015 campaign. Although used more often on women's fashion, some men's clothing have been inspired by South Asian truck art. Apart from clothing, truck art has also been incorporated into shoes by some.

=== Print design ===
Farid Bawa, an Indian graphic designer, collaborates with Indian truck artists to make and sell prints of truck art online in a bid to preserve the tradition of truck art.

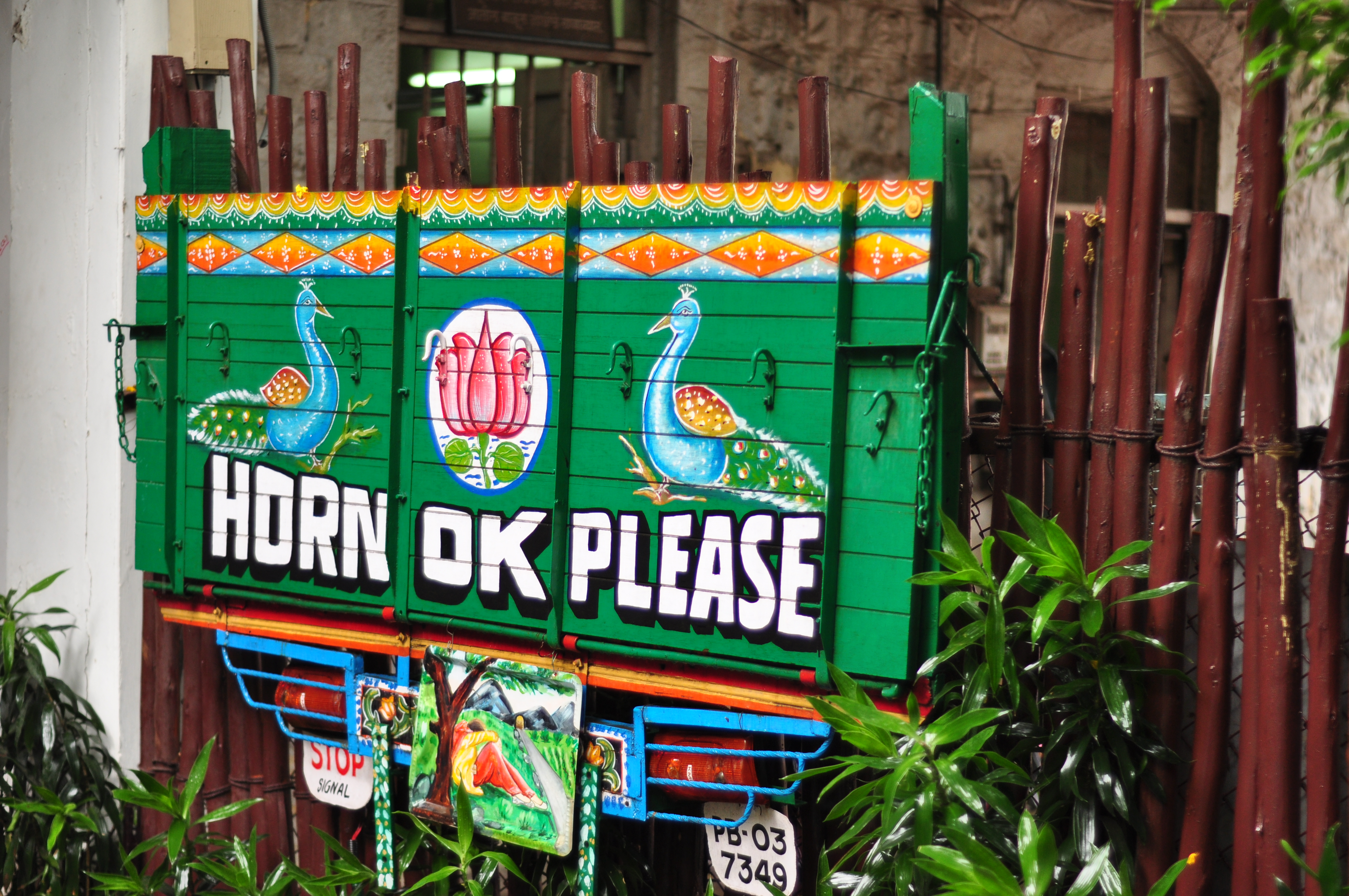
Truck art on a fence in Pune, India

=== Home Decor ===
In Pakistan, home decoration accessories inspired by truck art are sold, from decorative pieces and furniture to bags, boxes, nameplates, and personalized keepsakes.

=== New mediums ===
South Asian truck art has expanded beyond vehicles into many modern mediums. Many artists use high-resolution digital graphics and vinyl stickers to replicate traditional designs. In India, truck art has evolved into a digital style, mixing traditional motifs with computer-generated imagery. Online platforms and social media have helped globalize the art form, allowing artists to reach wider audiences and collaborate with brands.

The art form has been used in large-scale urban murals like Doha’s JedariArt. Artists such as Haider Ali have also decorated non-traditional surfaces, including shipping containers and aircraft. This range of mediums reflects truck art’s evolving role as both a commercial product and a cultural export.

== Gallery ==
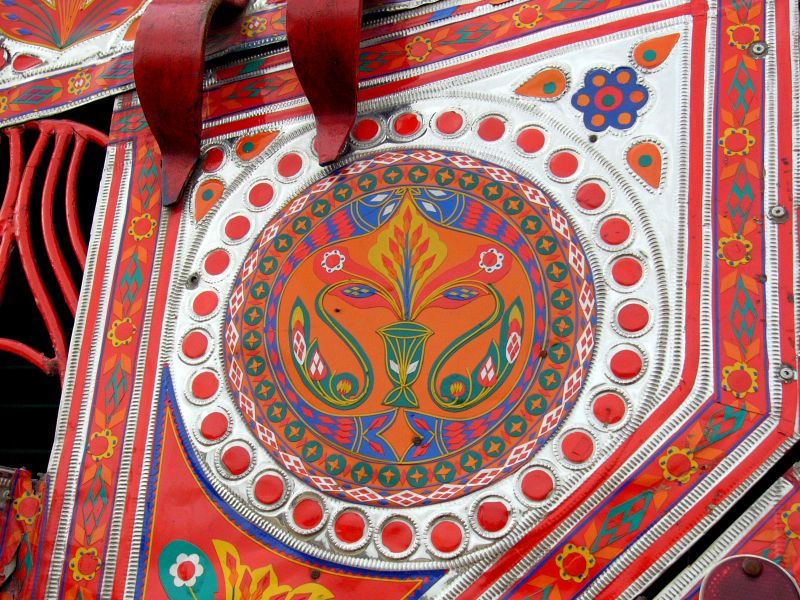
Decorations can be highly detailed.

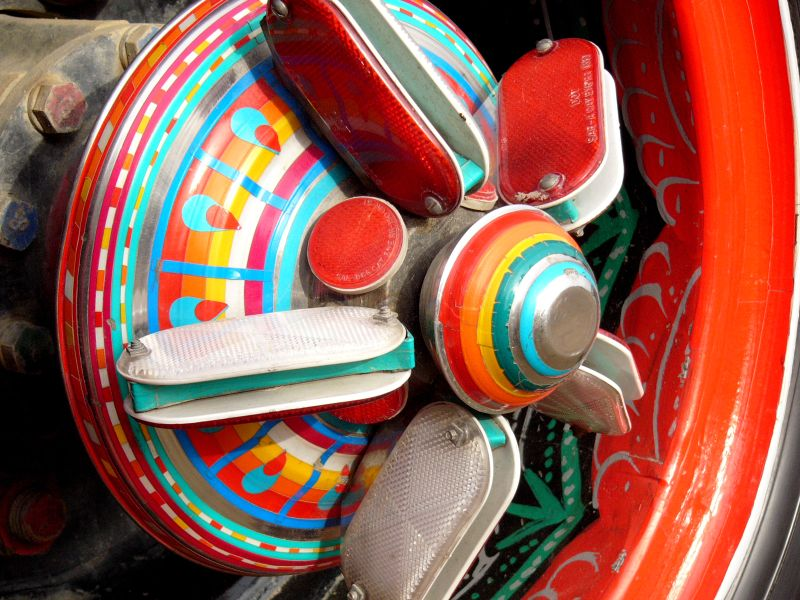
All parts of the truck are highly embellished.

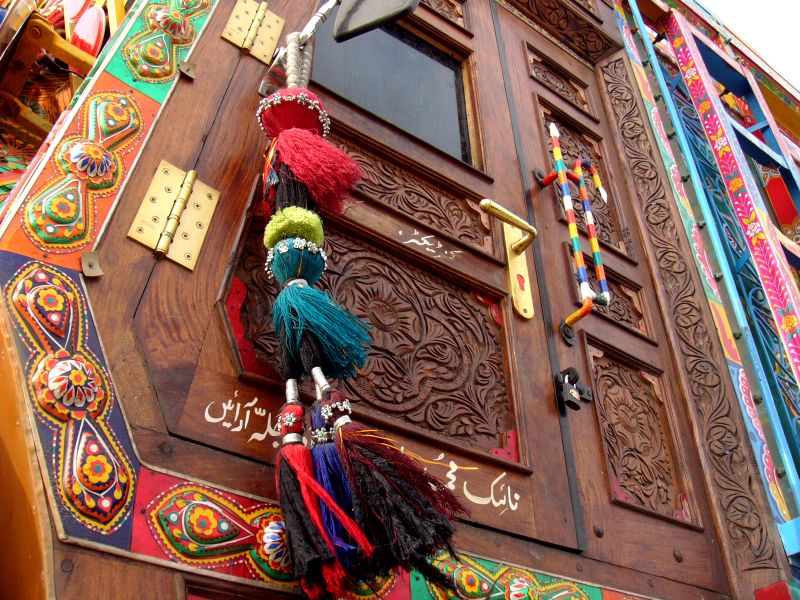
Wood-paneling is often carved in high detail.

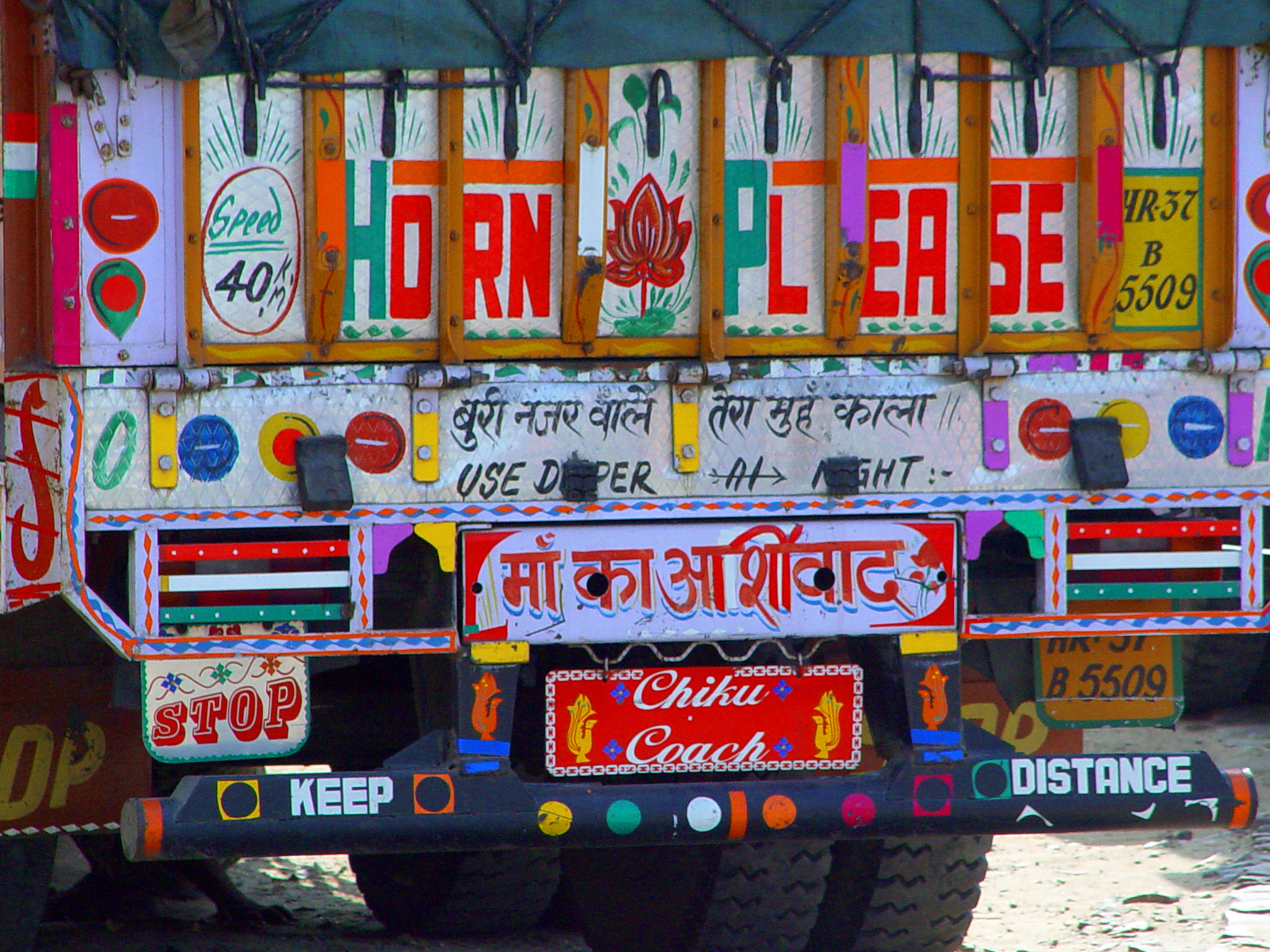
The phrase "Horn Please" is used extensively in Indian truck art.

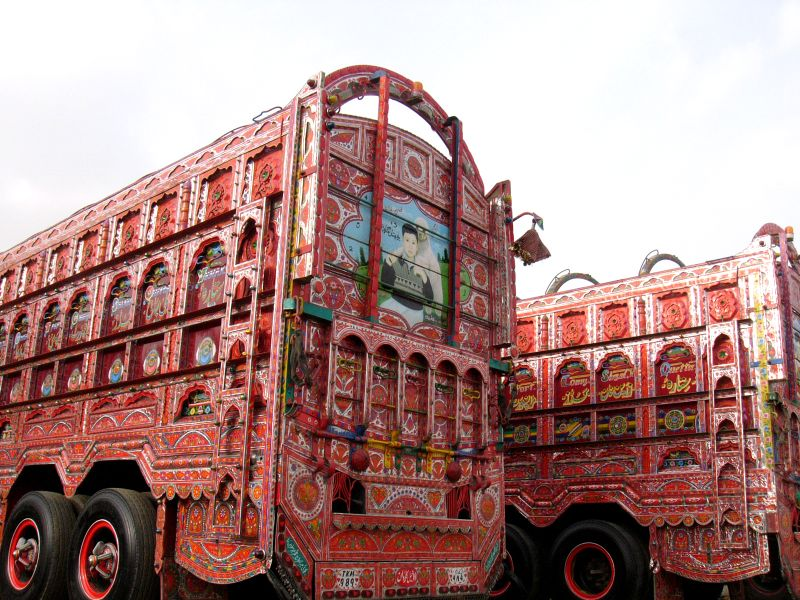
The backs of Pakistani trucks are often intricately decorated.

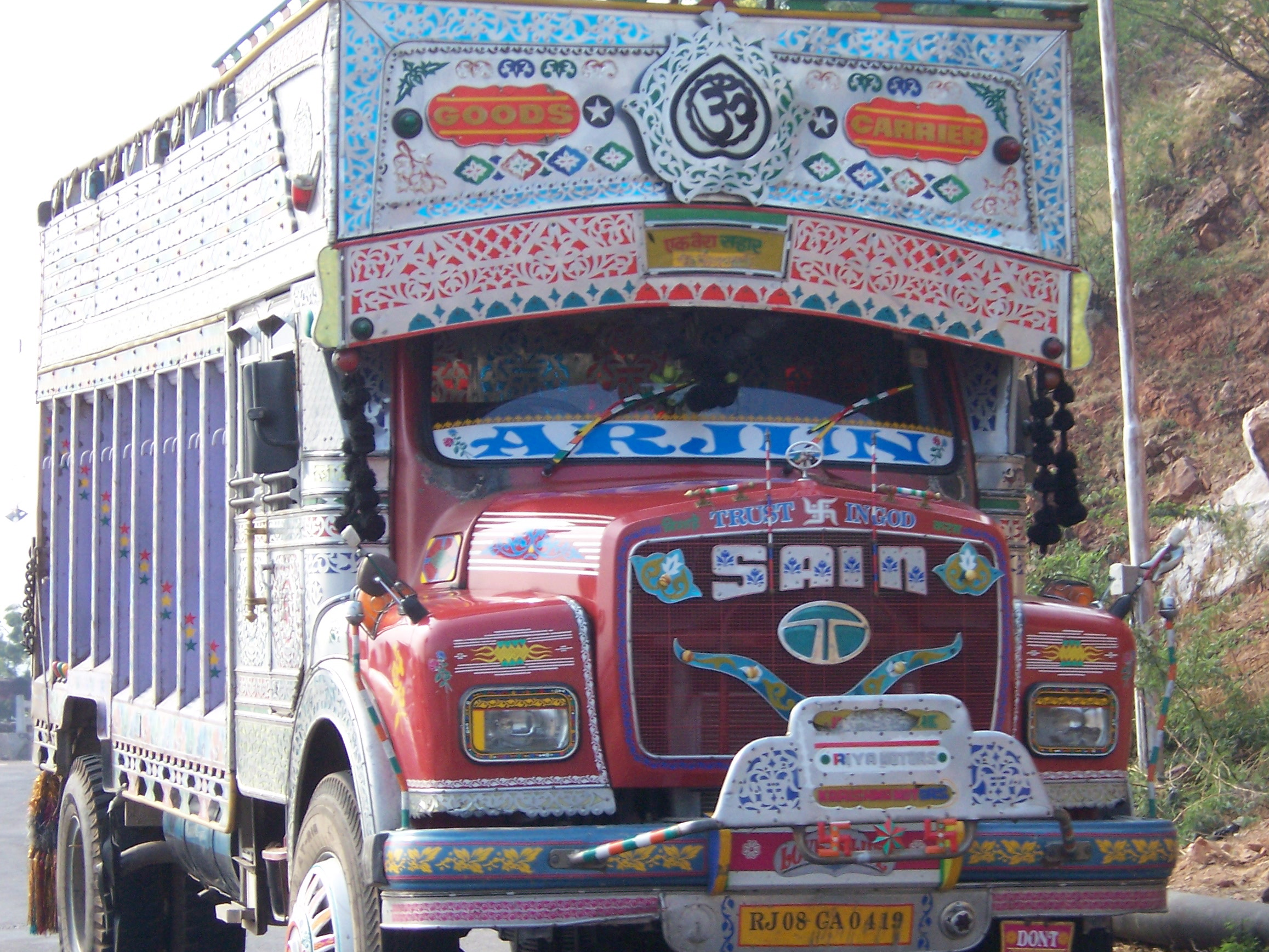
Decorated truck in Rajasthan.

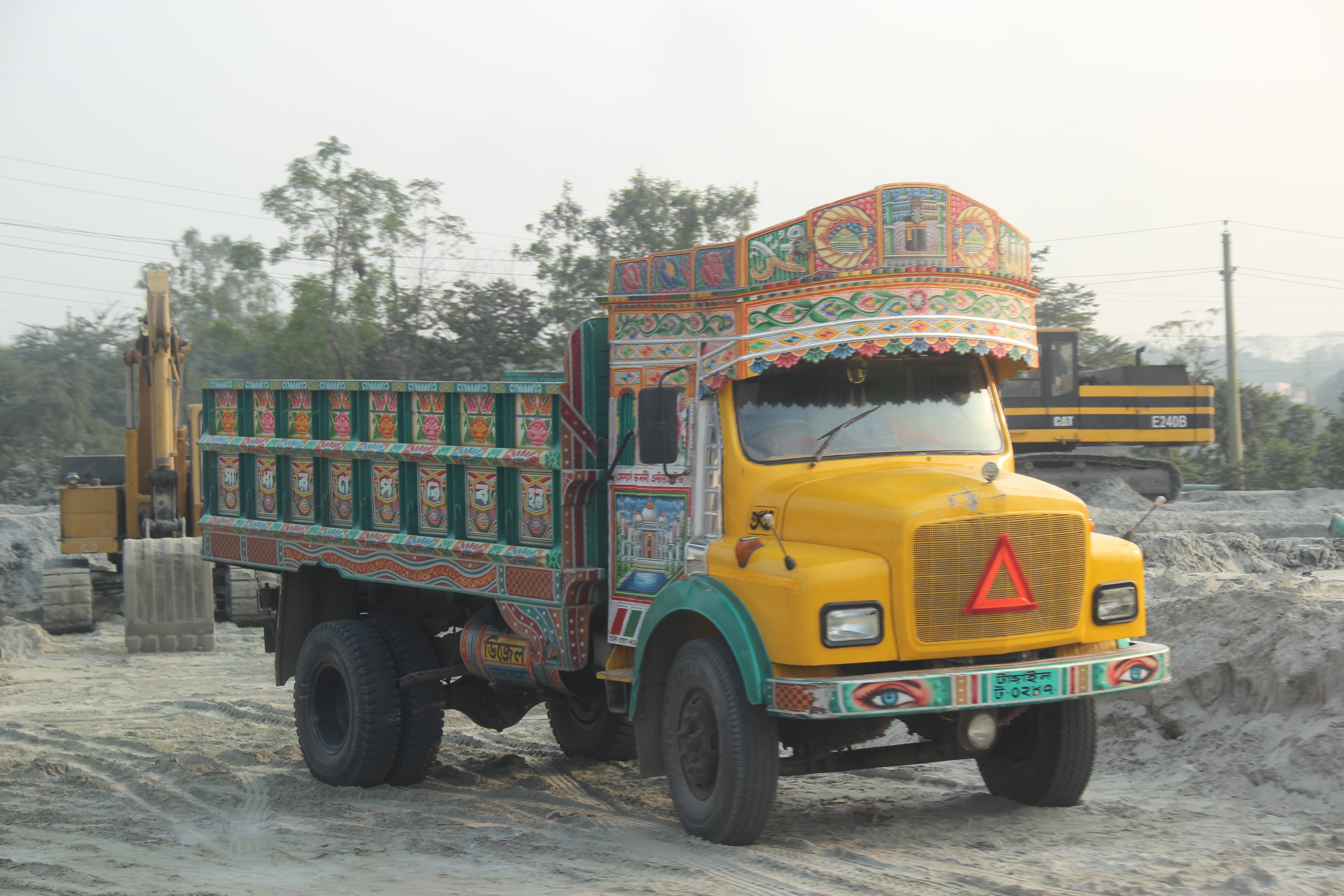
A decorated truck near Dhaka.

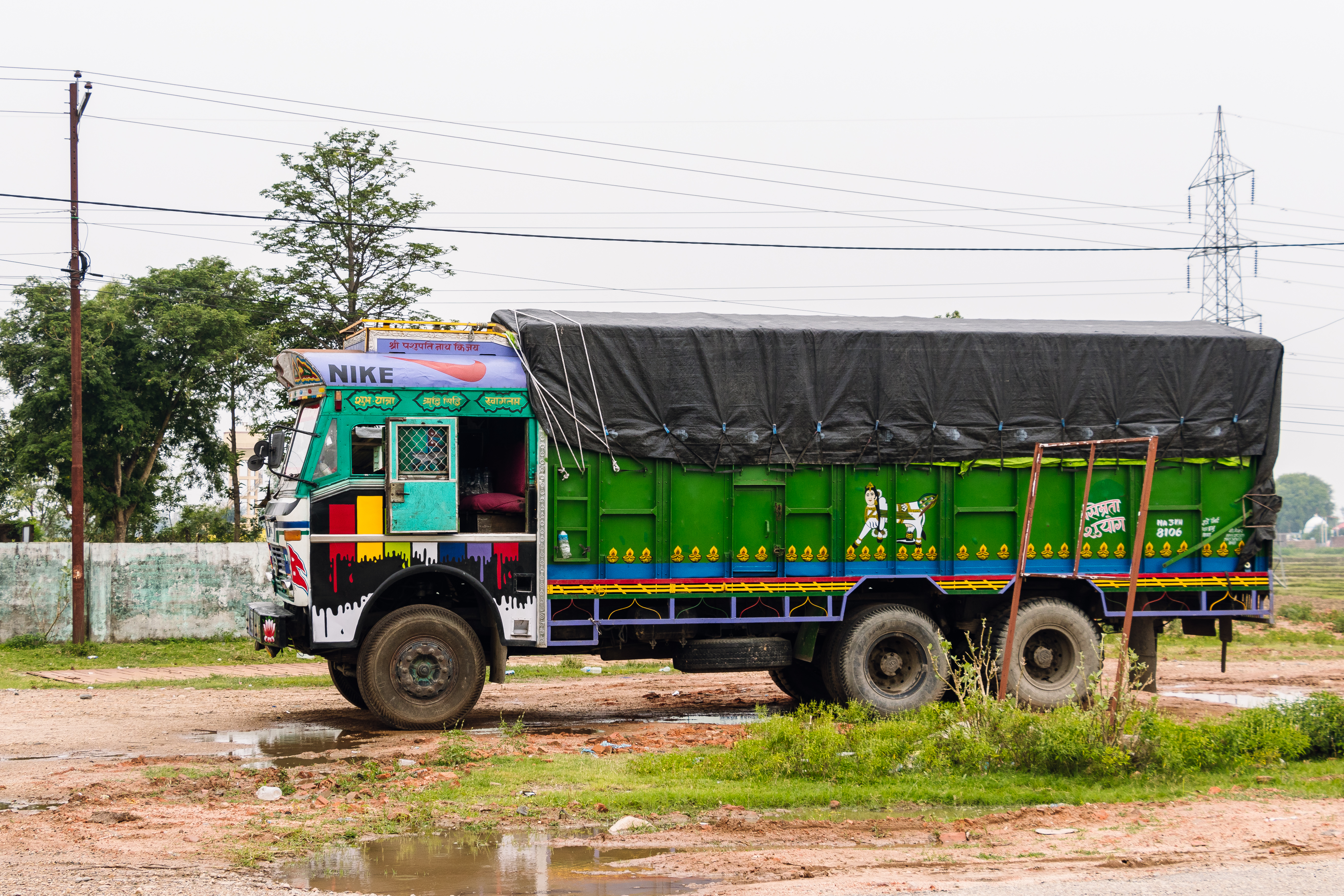
Truck art in Nepal often contains modern symbols alongside traditional ones.

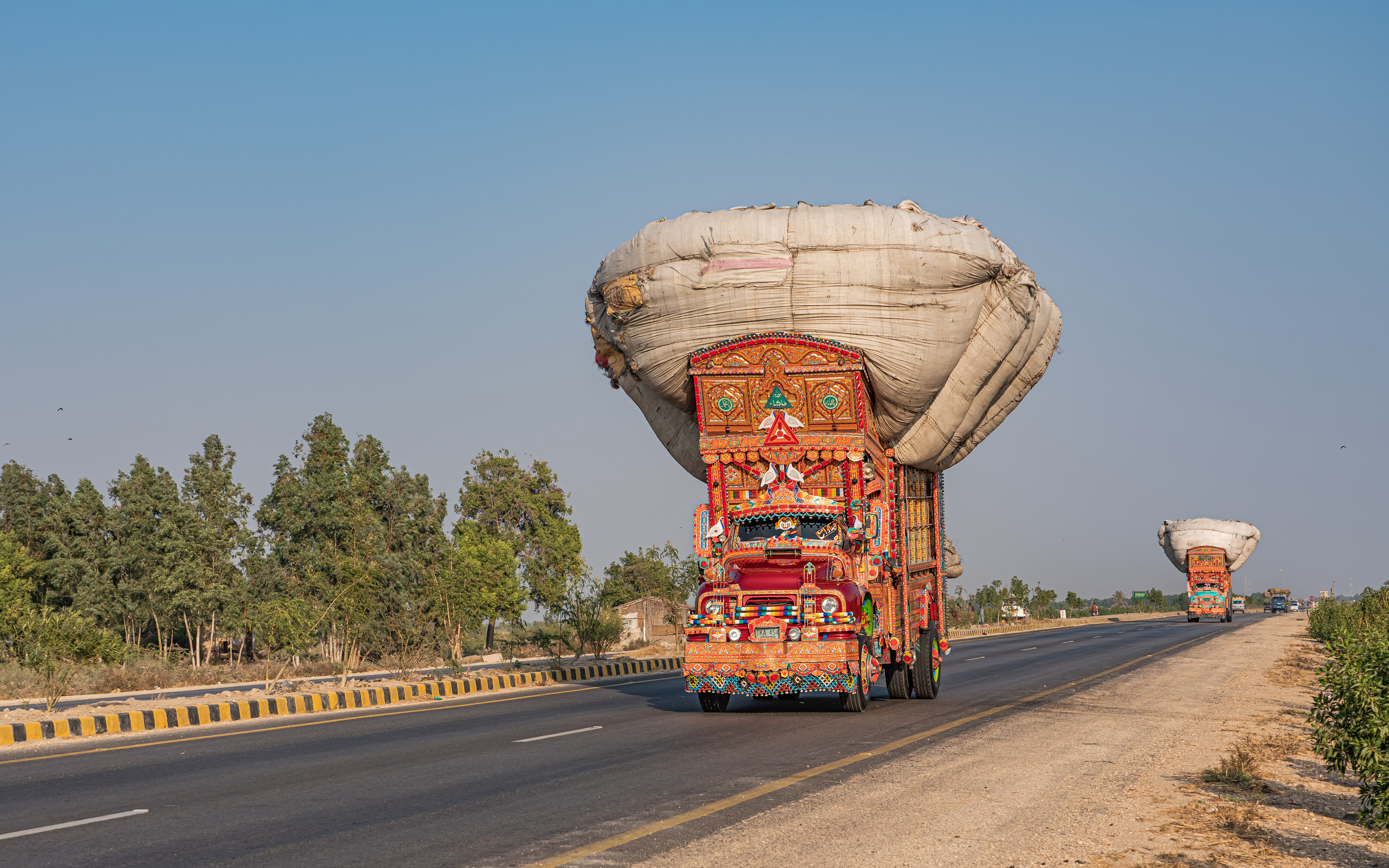
Two decorated trucks on Pakistan's N-5 National Highway.

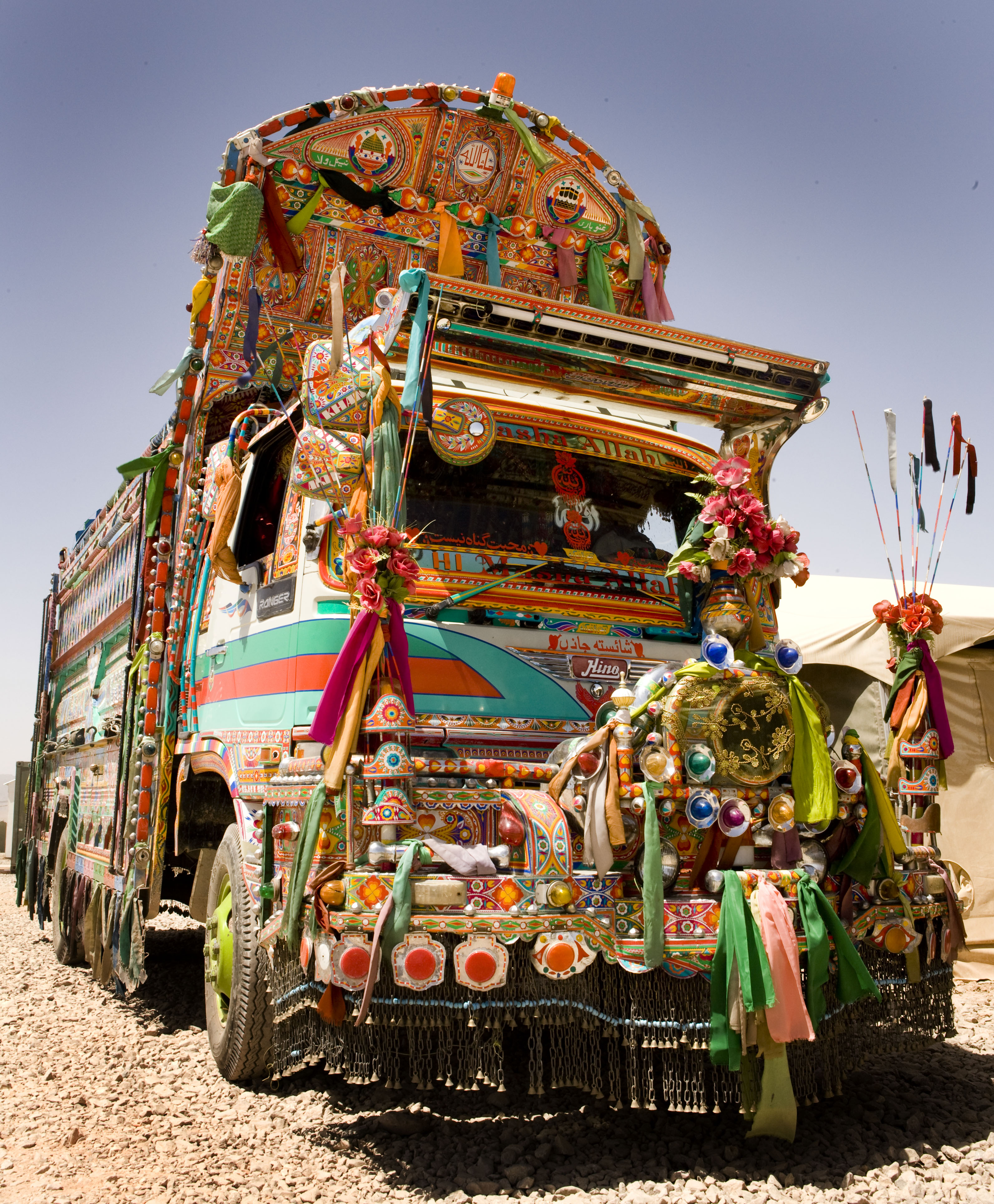
Decorated truck in Afghanistan.

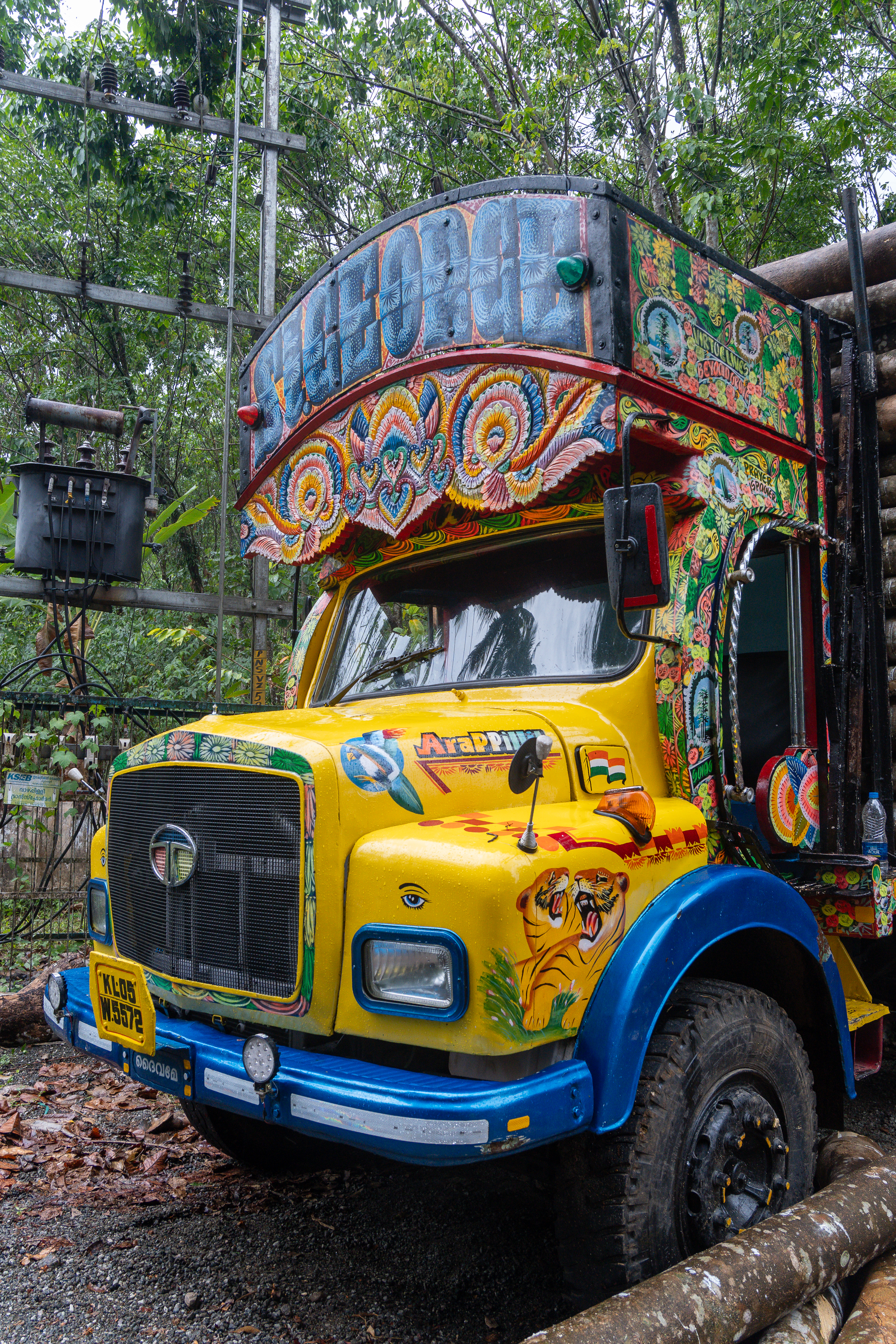
A decorated truck in Kerala.

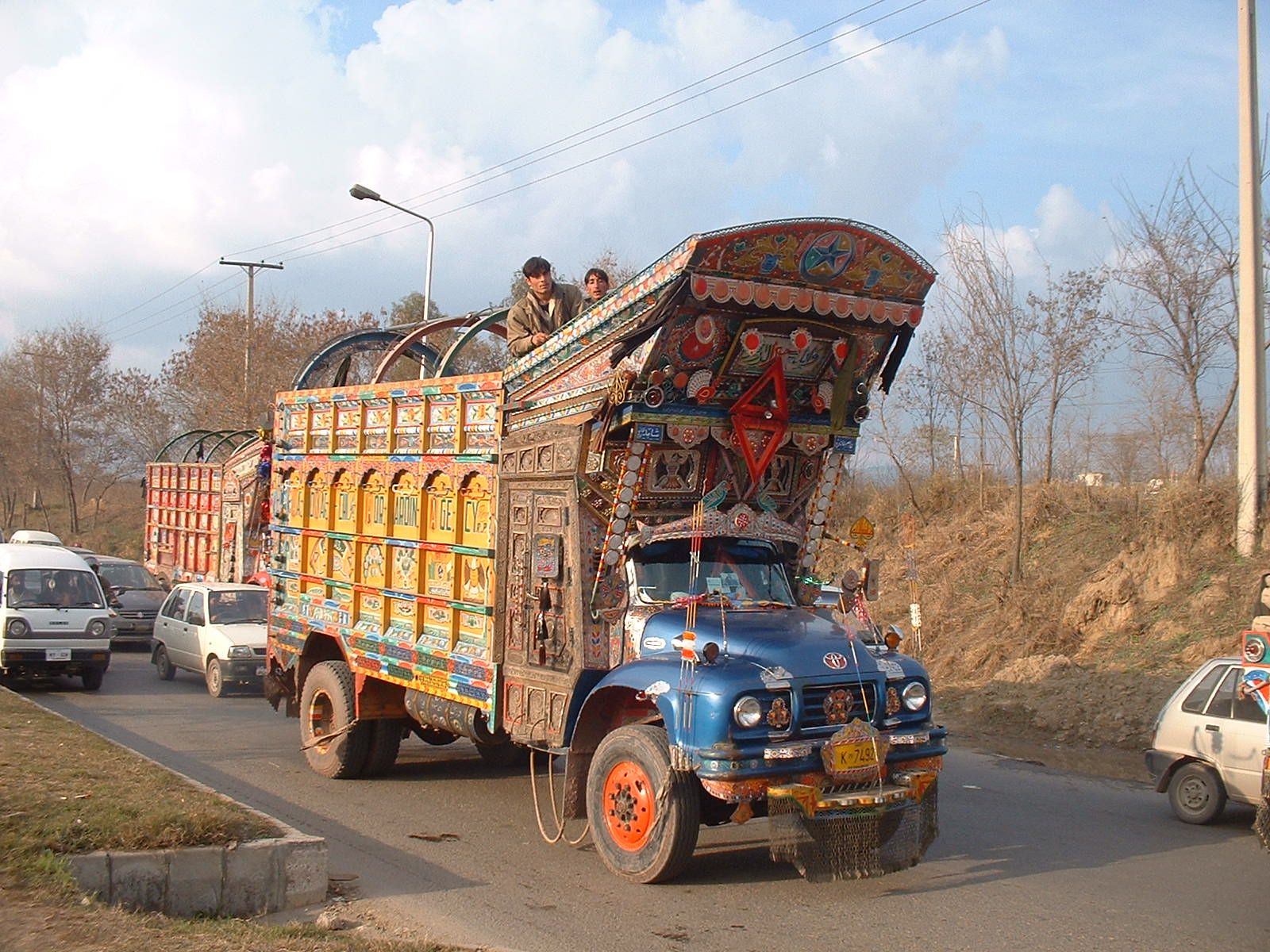
A decorated truck in the wood-paneled Khyber Pakhtunkhwa style.

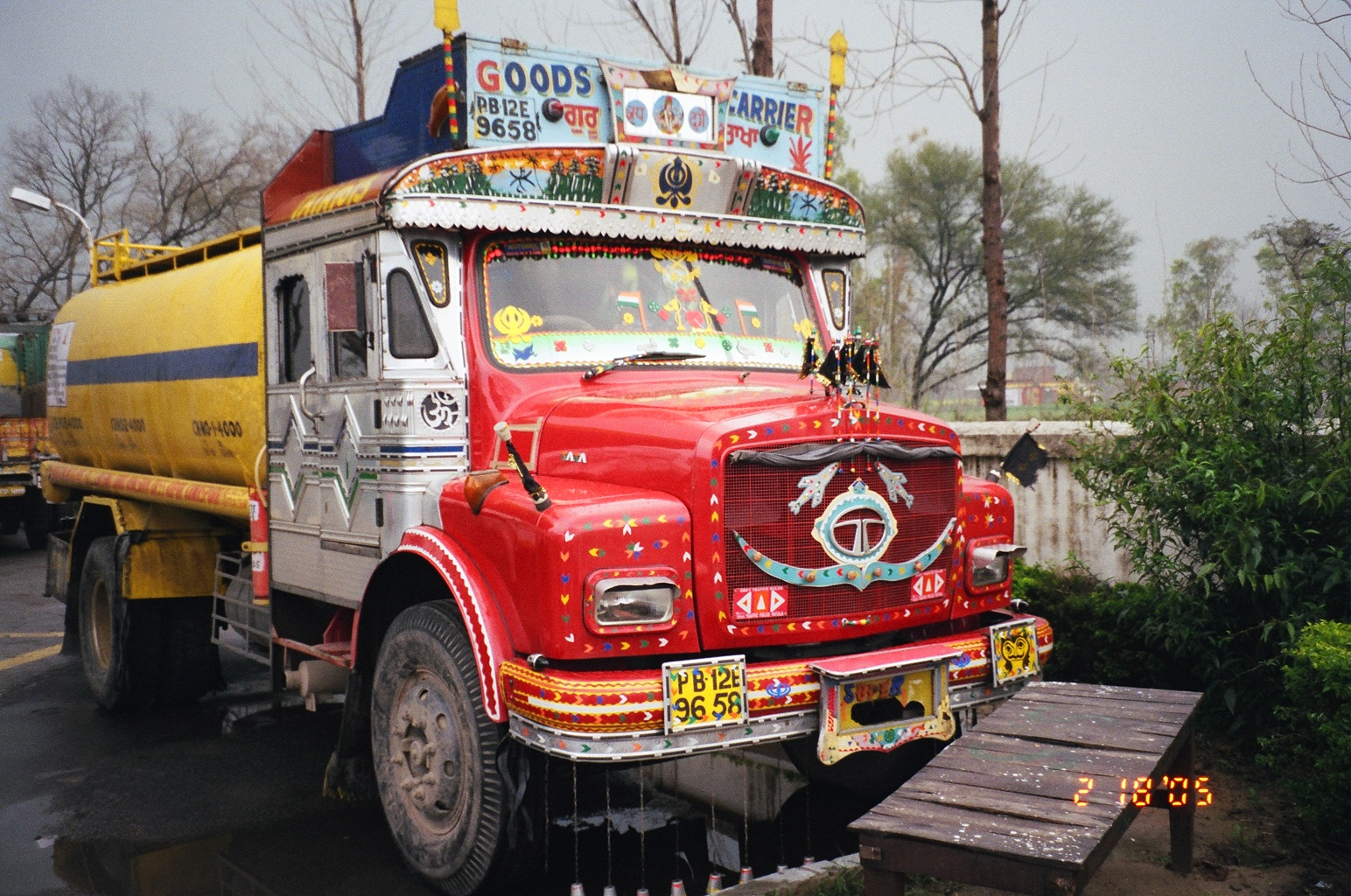
A decorated fuel truck from Punjab, India.

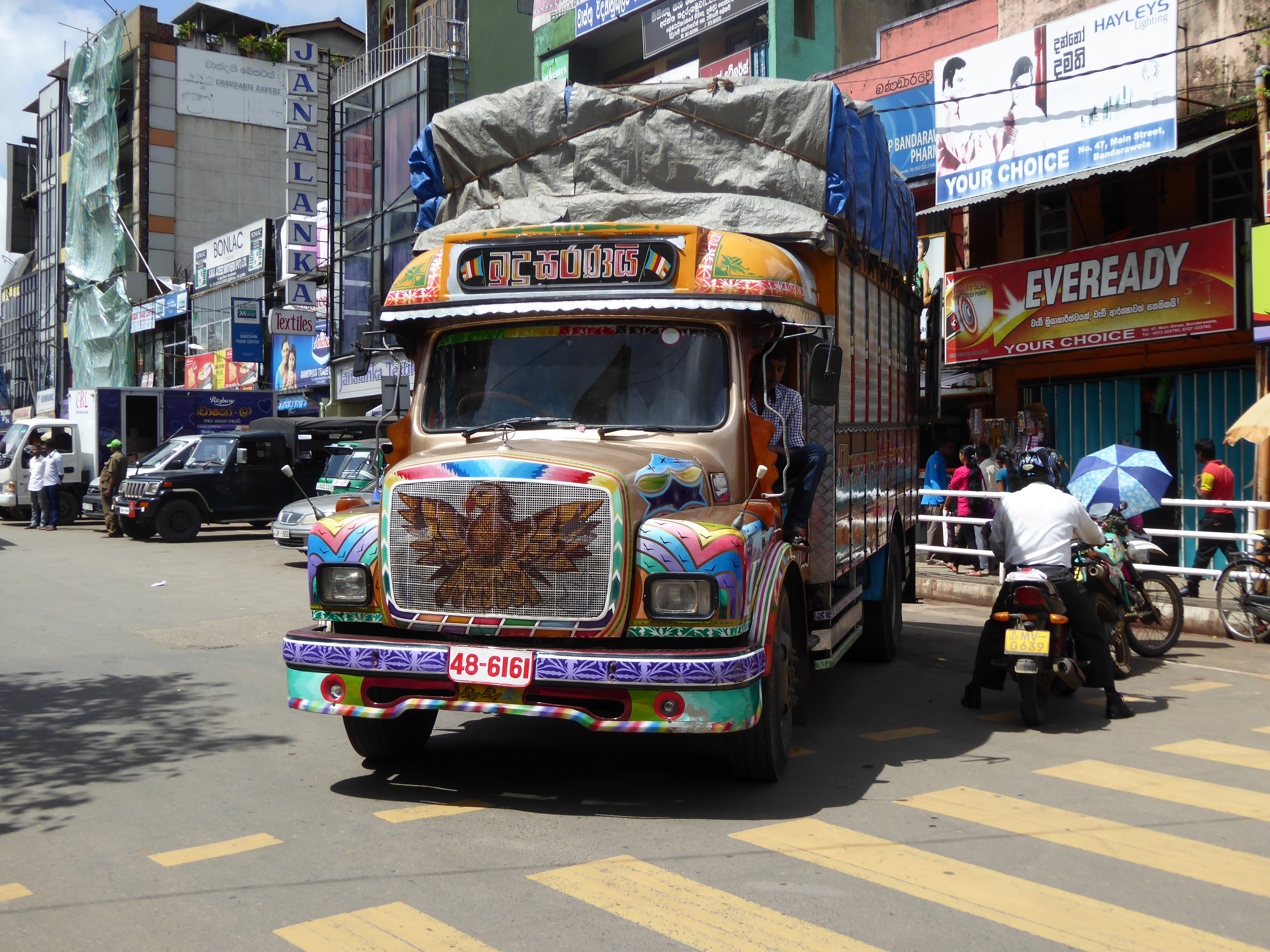
Decorated Sri Lankan truck

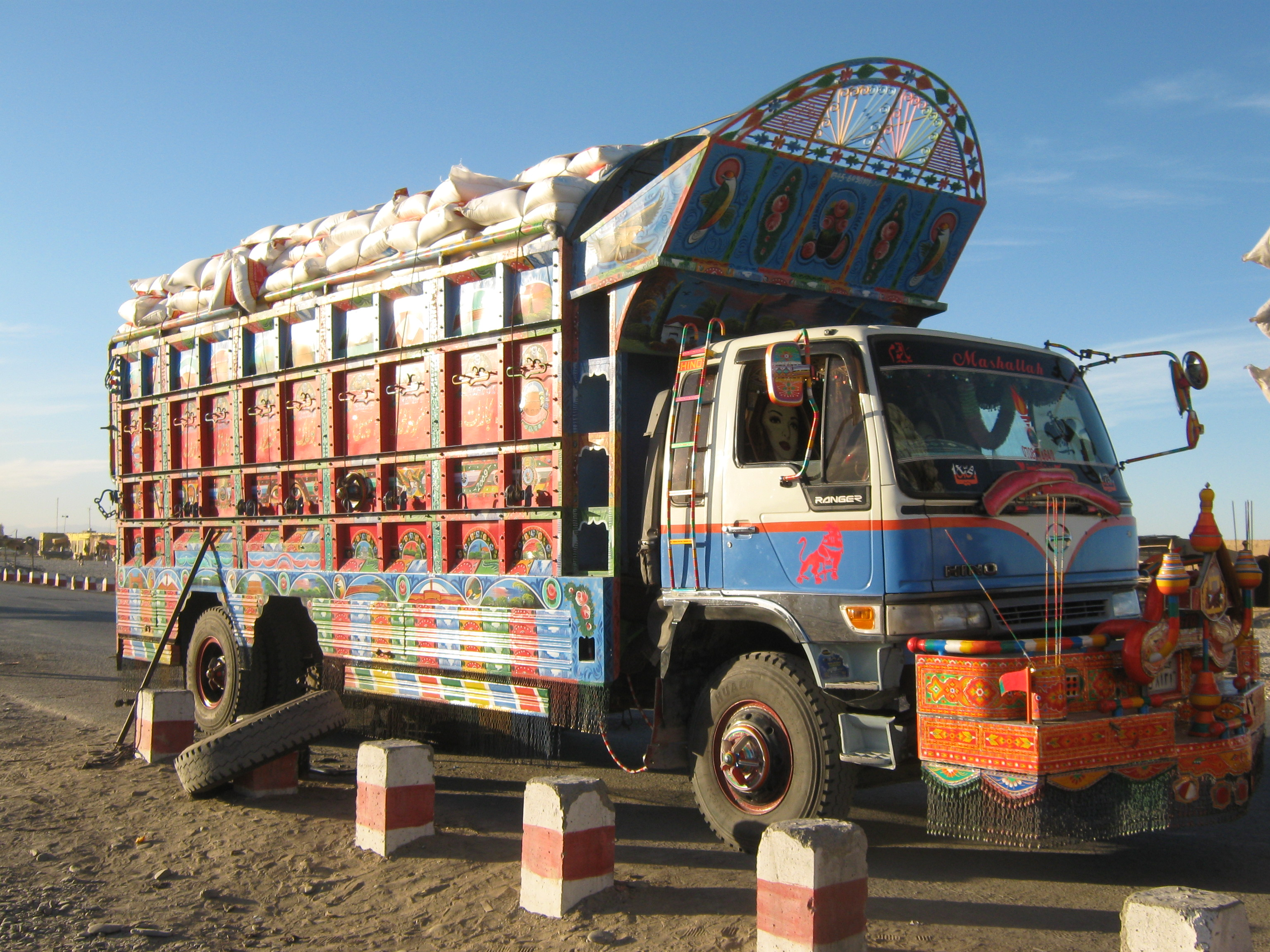
Jingle truck in Delaram, Afghanistan.

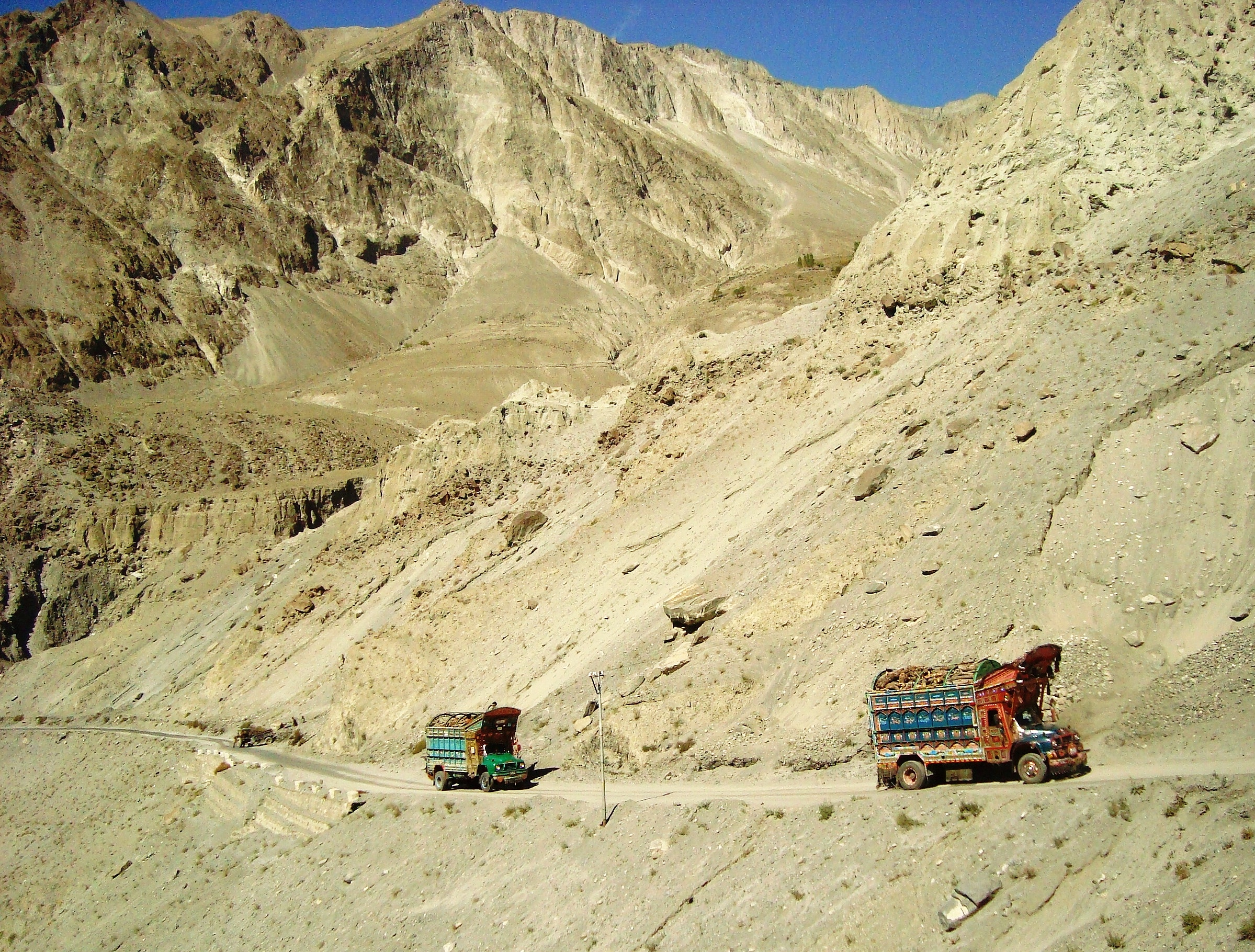
Decorated trucks can be found in even the most remote corners of Pakistan.

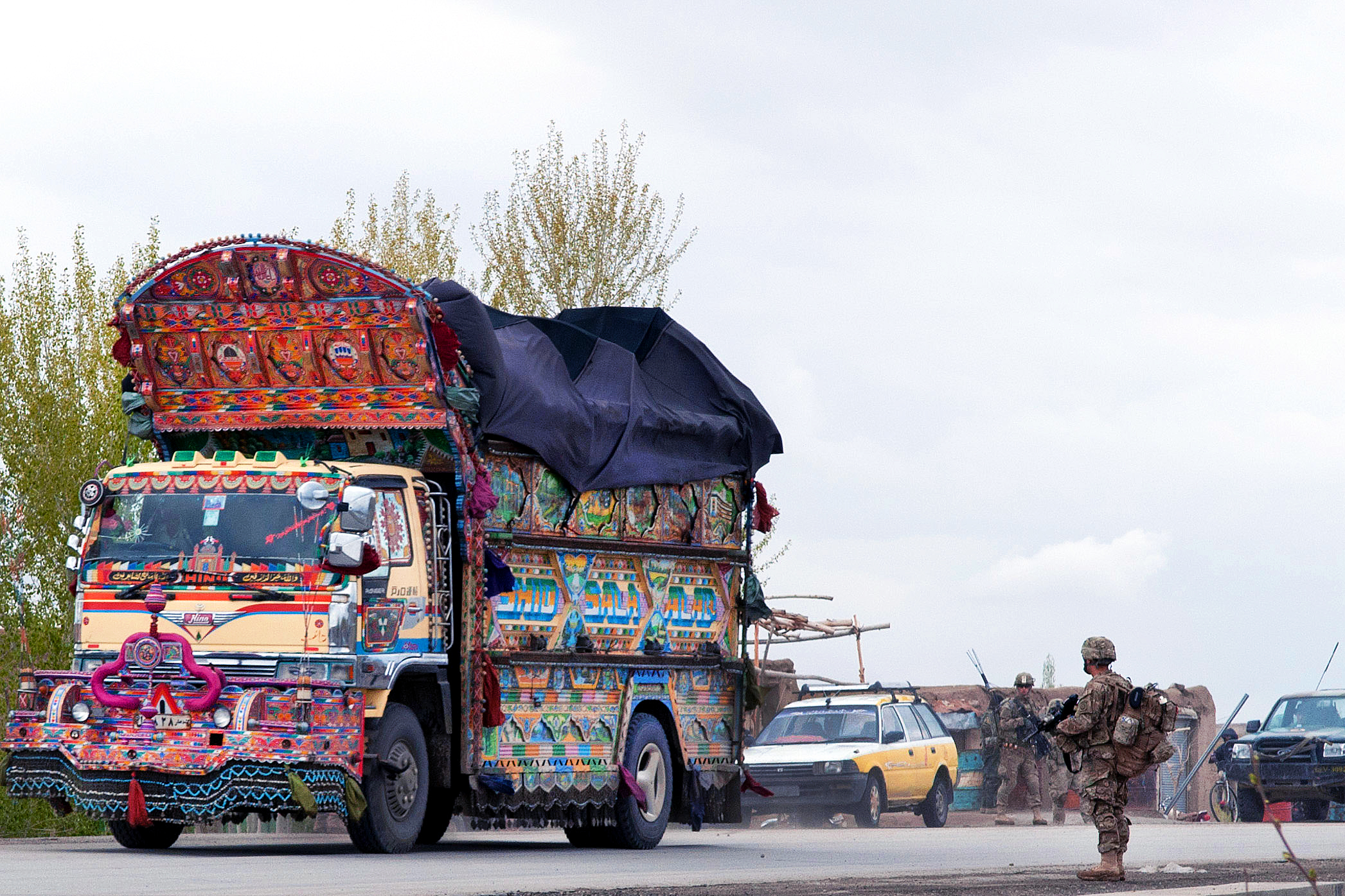
A "jingle truck" in Afghanistan

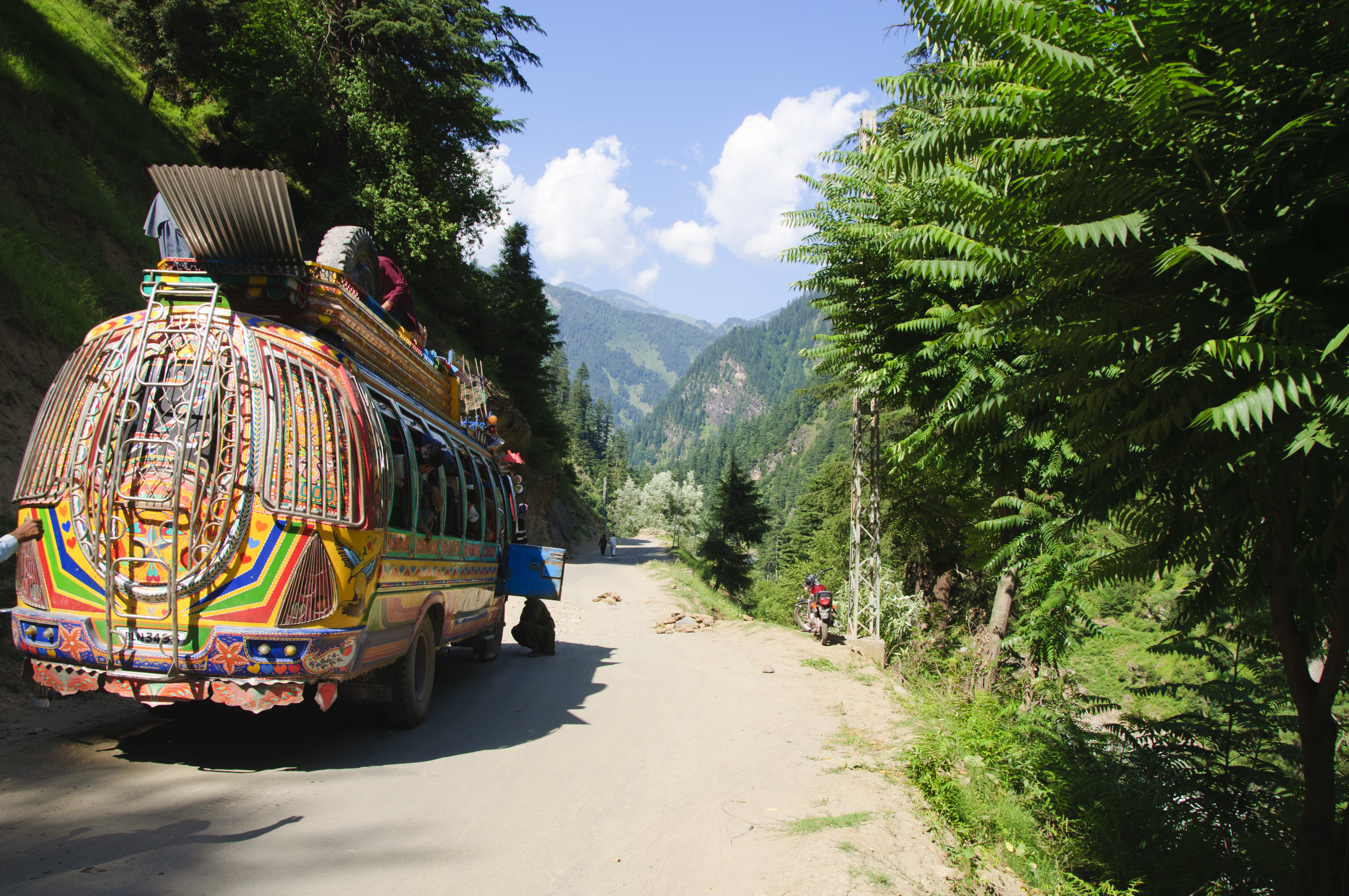
Many local buses in Pakistan are decorated with truck art.

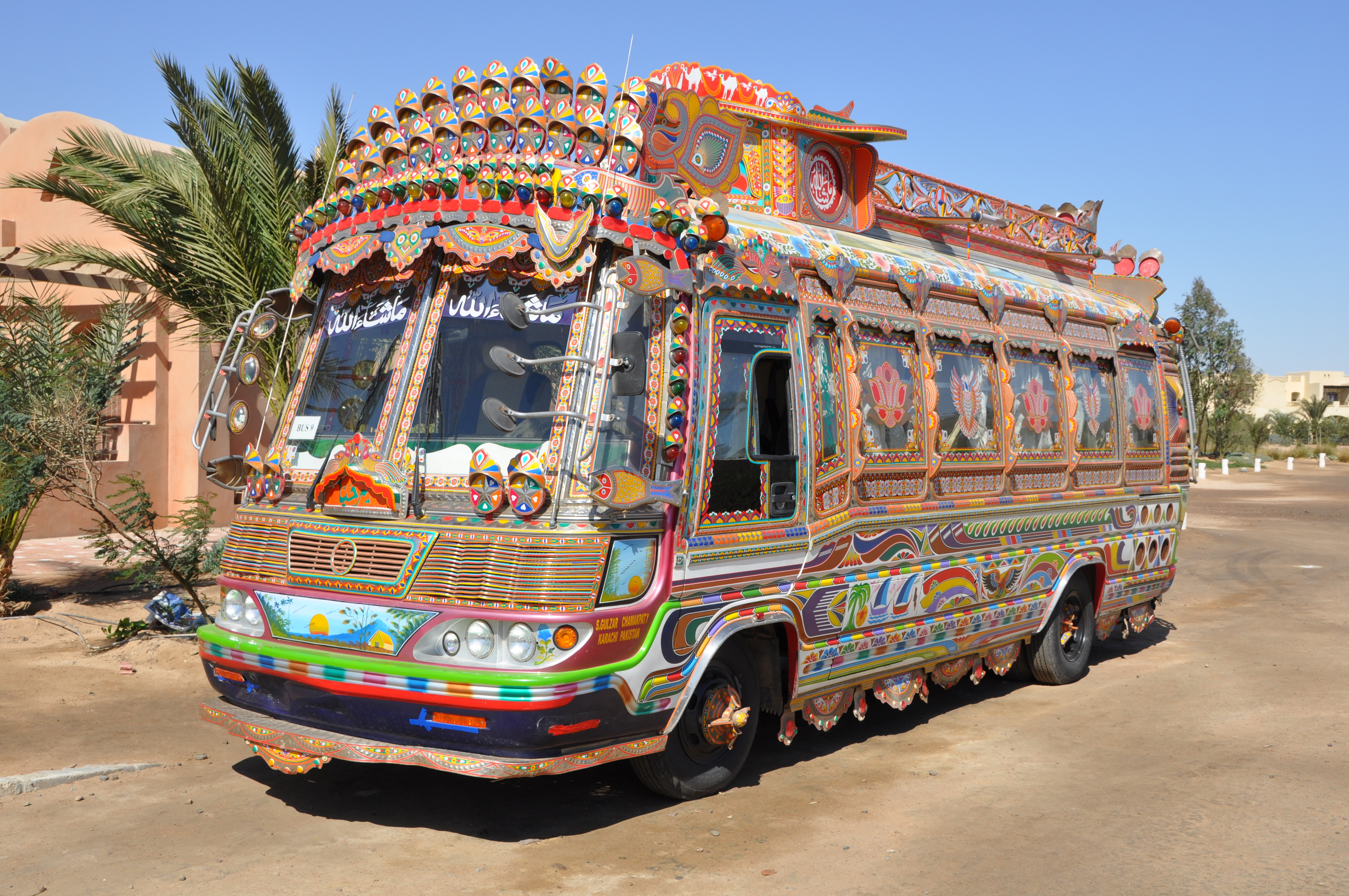
A public transport bus in El Gouna, Egypt customised and highly decorated in Pakistani style

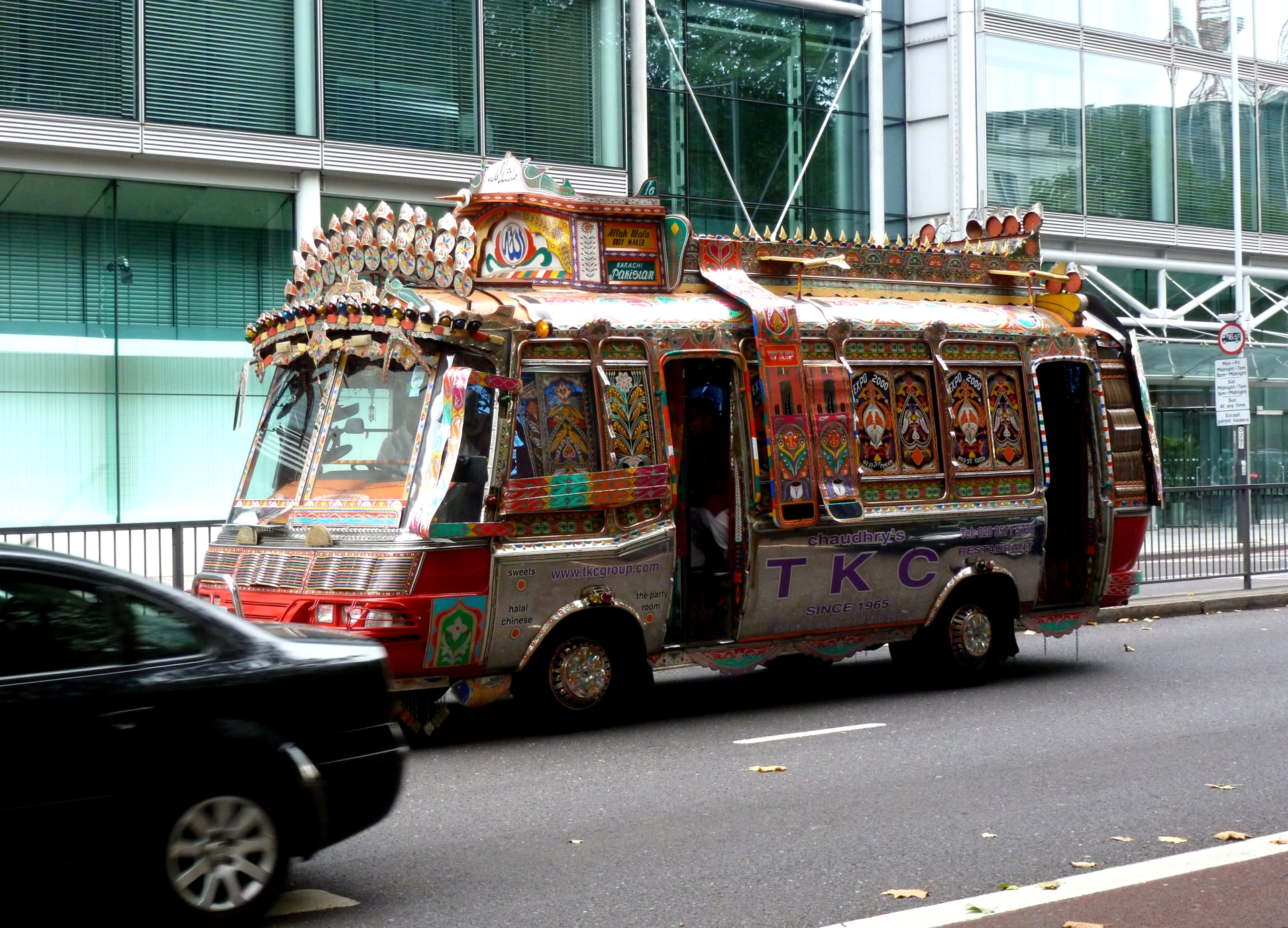
A Pakistani-decorated bus on Euston Road, London.

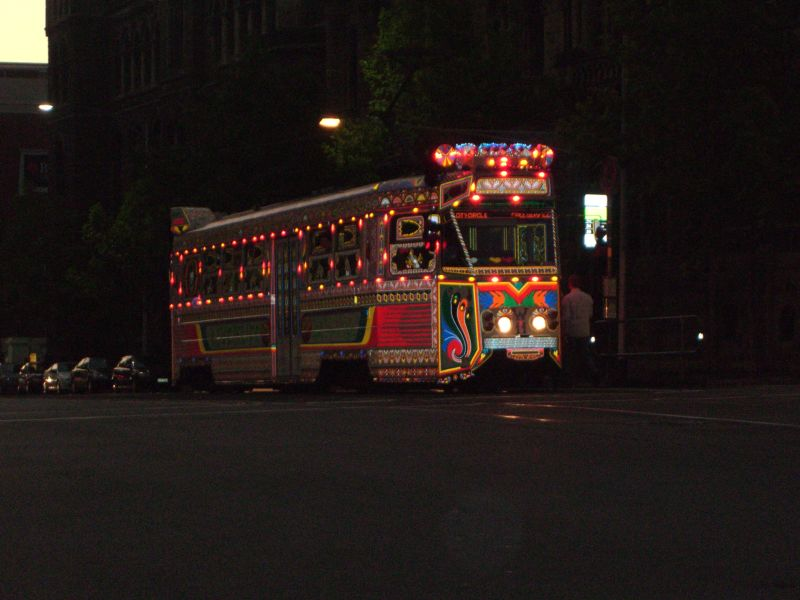
The Karachi to Melbourne Tram, decorated by Pakistani truck artists, during the 2006 Commonwealth Games

== See also ==
- Karachi to Melbourne Tram
- Dekotora
- Tap tap
