= Colectivo =

Public transportation vehicles in Argentina

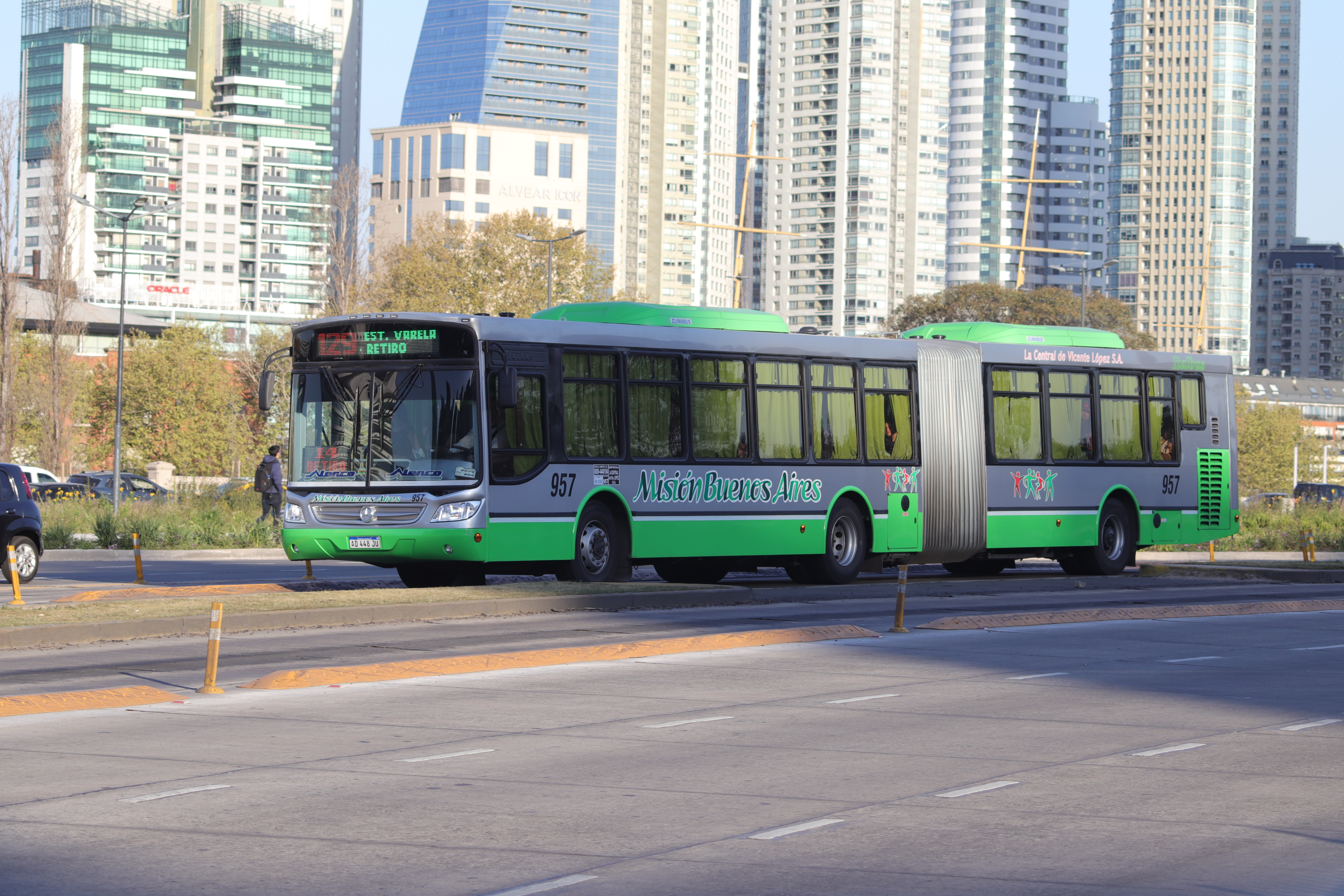
Line 129 in San Nicolás Neighbourhood.

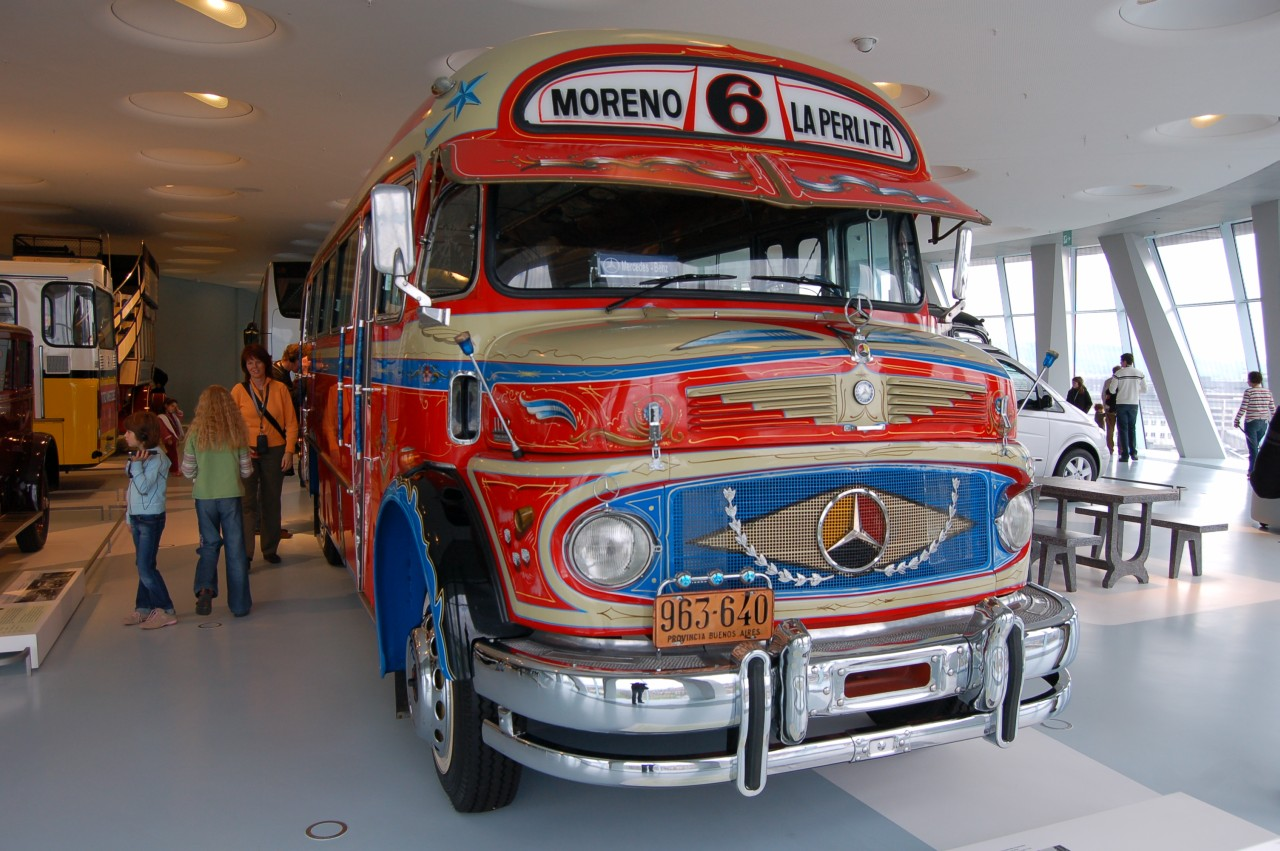
A colourful classic "short snout" 1969 MB LO1112 colectivo at the Mercedes-Benz Museum in Stuttgart.

Colectivo (English: collective bus), also colloquially known as bondi, cole, micro, is the name given in Argentina to a type of public transportation vehicle, especially those of Argentina's capital city, Buenos Aires. The name comes from vehículos de transporte colectivo ("vehicles for collective transport"), reflecting their origin as shared taxis.

When they first appeared in the 1920s, colectivos were small buses built out of smaller vehicle chassis (cars, vans, etc.) and, later, out of truck chassis (1950–1990, by Mercedes-Benz Argentina), not specifically designed for the transportation of people, and were decorated with unique hand-painted drawings (fileteado) that gave each unit a distinct flavor.

They steadily evolved and grew larger, but kept their picturesque style until the 1990s, when the urban fleet was modernized with standard rear-engined bus units.

During most of their history, tickets were sold by the driver, who would drive off as soon as all passengers had boarded, selling tickets while driving.

== History ==
=== 1928–1950 ===
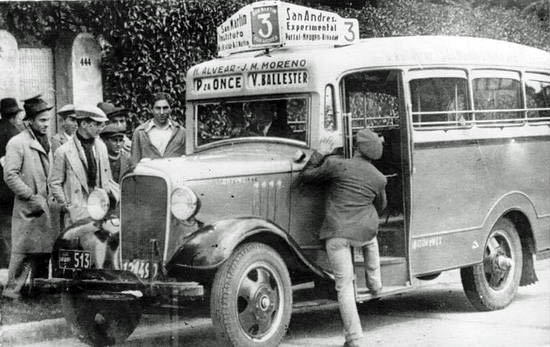
1934 Chevrolet truck chassis colectivo

Taxi-bus, Chevrolet Double Phaeton, creation of the "líneas"

In the 1900s Argentina was the "Granary of the World", one of the largest world food producers and exporters, and a wealthy country. The streets of prosperous Buenos Aires (with 2 million inhabitants) soon filled with cars. Commercial relations with the United Kingdom (mainly trade in meat and grain), also brought a myriad of investors and enterprises in the early years of the century, including Latin America's first metro system, cars, trains, tramways, taxis and public buses.

On 24 September 1928, the first taxi-bus ran through Buenos Aires. Later called "colectivo", it was based on an Argentine-manufactured longer-wheelbase Chevrolet Superior K-series Double Phaeton called "Especial Argentino". It provided public transportation throughout Buenos Aires on pre-defined itineraries and stops, charging a low price for each passenger.

Chevrolet started manufacturing a truck chassis adaptable to passenger transport. By the 1930s the size of the colectivo had increased from five to up to a dozen seats, and the Chevrolet line had become widely used, with bodies made by local companies. This style was kept until the 1970s and 1980s, by which time the units had twenty seats plus cramped room for many standing passengers.

During its heyday, drivers deliberately challenged the "real" public buses and electric tramways, parking near them at the busiest stations and driving close to them during the day to pick up their passengers. Soon people started to prefer these colectivos, which displaced the original buses and trams.

With time the routes were formalized, and owners of colectivos joined together into lines that operated standard routes, distinguished by numbers displayed on the colectivos. Since several lines often traversed the same roads, companies began to adopt different colors to distinguish their units more clearly than by the number alone. Line 60, a particularly well-known line with a long route, had its beginnings in this era.

=== 1950–1990 ===
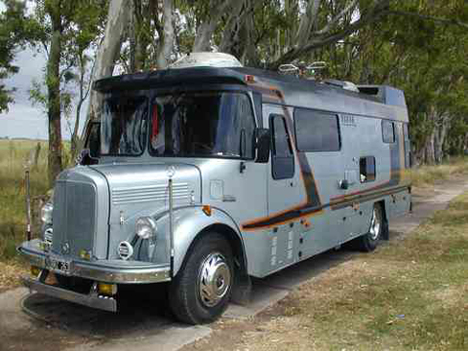
Classic Mercedes Benz LO 3500 colectivo turned motorhome

Mercedes-Benz truck and buses

After World War II and during the 1950s Argentine industry started to develop again, but the country's public transport system was inadequate for the new era: practically no modernization had taken place since the early years, and the suburban railway system was not sufficient to meet the rising demands of the population.

Mercedes-Benz moved into the colectivo market: in 1951 the then Daimler-Benz AG set up in Argentina its first factories outside Germany: one in the town of San Martín, near Buenos Aires, and another in González Catán.

Mercedes released updated local colectivo chassis, a modified L 3500 truck chassis – LO 3500, OP 3500, LO 311, LO 312, LO 911 (the [O] stands for Omnibus) – with a separately manufactured body fitted later by different coachbuilders. In less than a decade the output was 6,500 units a year. In 1963 Mercedes built the 10,000nd colectivo (model LO 312), and continued with other models, such as L 1112 (120 HP), LA 1112 (all-wheel traction) and the L 1114. The Mercedes-Benz colectivos had truck powerplants, a diesel engine with power transmitted to the rear axle by a five-speed constant-mesh gearbox.

All the lines progressively adopted these units and, from 1950 to 1990, all colectivos were eventually Mercedes-Benz models.

=== 1990s to the present ===
Omnibus. Blurring of the tradition of the colectivo

In 1987 El Detalle, one of the bus body suppliers of Mercedes-Benz, started competing with its former chassis provider, investing in low price and modern urban buses, with cheaper Deutz engines. That same year model El Detalle OA-101 was launched. This model was rear-engined and had pneumatic suspension, providing smoother rides and more inside space. Mercedes-Benz responded the following year with the rear-engined OH-1314, which was considered "the death of the Colectivo".

In 1989, the last truck-based colectivos, on the classic Mercedes-Benz chassis LO-1114, were assembled. Production had been discontinued the previous year.

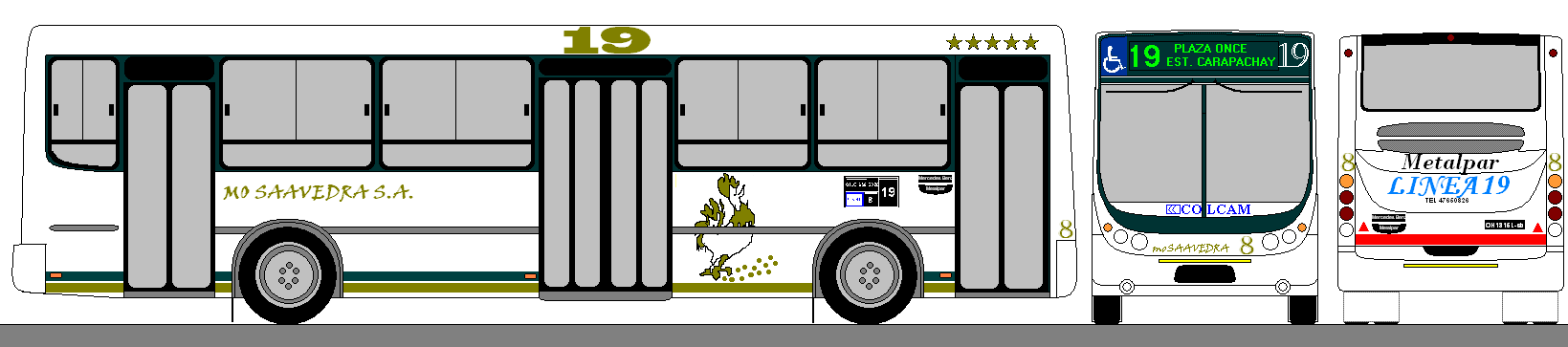
Modern colectivo model Metalpar Tronador OH1315L-sb Mercedes Benz

During the 1990s some companies found it cheaper to switch to single-colored units, and a flurry of mergers and foldings changed the appearance of colectivos.

Nowadays, only the three-digit numbering and some of the routes survive from the traditional "líneas", fileteado is rarely seen, the filigranas were lost, and some of the classic big details, such as the panoramic mirrors close to the driver's head, disappeared.

After 1995, automatic ticket machines made journeys safer, since drivers did not have to sell tickets and drive at the same time.

In 2005, Mercedes-Benz units accounted for about half of the buses in the city of Buenos Aires and its surroundings, with units built in Buenos Aires (La Favorita, Eivar, Italbus, Bimet-Corwin, Galicia, CND, CEAP, Ugarte, etc.) and in Brazil (Marcopolo, CAIO and others). The other half were El Detalle units and others such as Scania, Volvo, Dimex, Zanello and very few Ferroni.

Most older units have been retired from service in Buenos Aires, as they are considered too dangerous and noisy for use in the fast-paced city. They were disposed of, or sent to smaller cities all over the country. Colectivos are usually retired only when they are too damaged to be repaired; some of them have “resuscitated” as fine motorhomes.

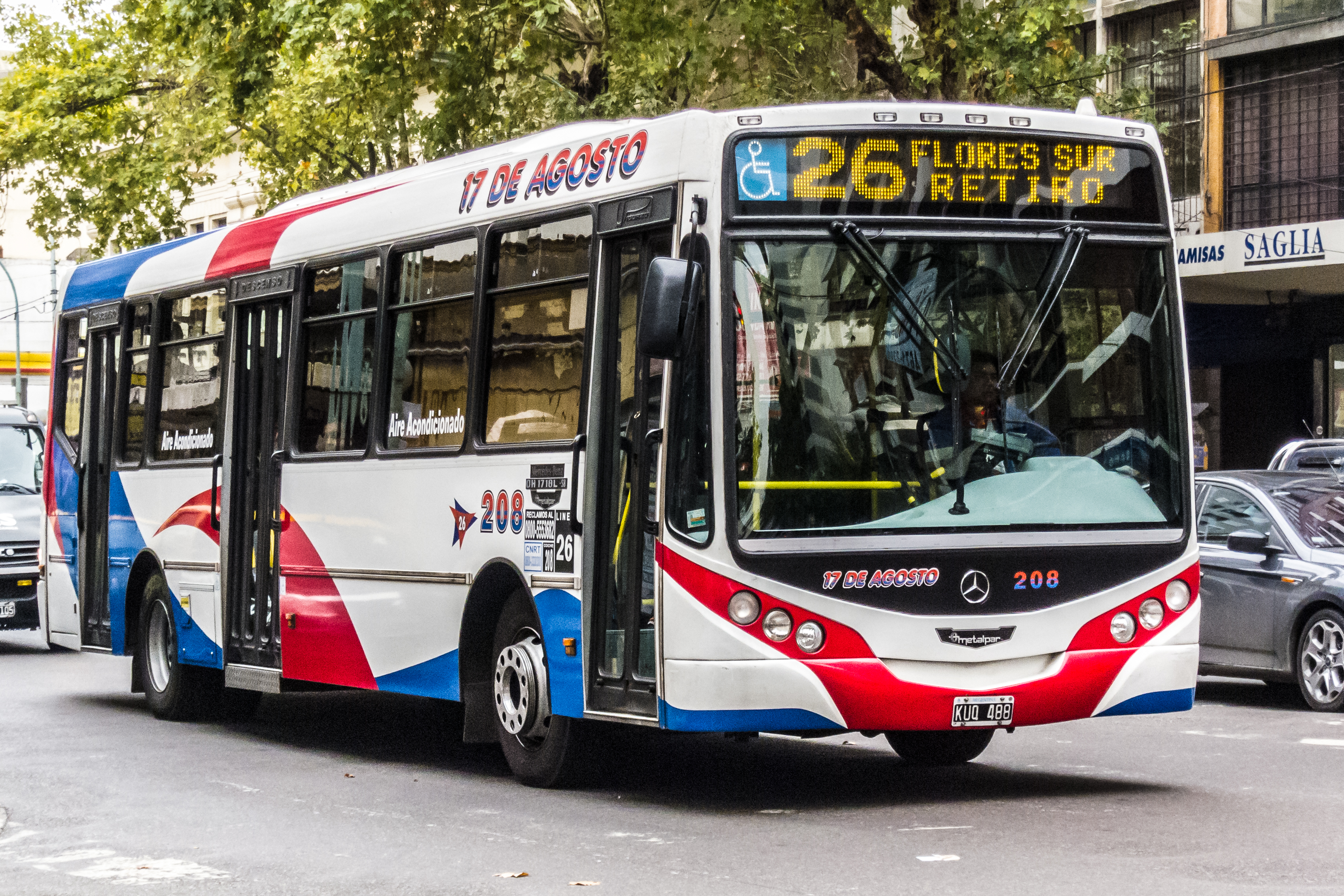
Latest generation colectivo

=== Multi-colored units ===
Decorators used many colorful combinations over the units' external body, helping identify each one of the líneas. These eventually evolved into "corporate colors": when one company ran several lines, they painted buses on all lines in the same colors. Until the 1990s the fileteado, individual to each bus, was maintained.

=== Fileteados ===
Fileteado has been defined as: "art on wheels": full of colored ornaments and symmetries completed with poetic phrases, sayings and aphorisms, both humorous or roguish, emotional or philosophical". The colectivos were where this art found its best canvas. Long, wide mirrors placed around the driver seat often had winding drawings and motifs that usually portrayed the driver's preferences in football, religion and tango. The outside of the units was also painted with fileteado details, flower motifs, national flags, and football team banners. It was also very common to see phrases written down in complex fonts, usually at the back. These phrases were often ingenious puns or rhymes and became part of Argentine folklore. A simple example of a very common phrase is: Lo mejor que hizo la vieja es el pibe que maneja (loosely "The best thing my mum did was this bus-driving kid").

=== Other details ===
The units with a larger budget had more details added around the driver's seat. These usually came in the form of lights of exotic colors or seat covers with wool and fringes or even leather. It was very common to see the gear-stick full of hanging knickknacks and the casing where the tickets and coins were stored covered with motifs.

Before 1995 tickets were sold by the colectivero (driver) while driving; they were colored strips of paper with a 5-digit number. Palindromic numbers (such as 10301) were called capicuas (from Catalan cap i cua, "head and tail") and sometimes collected.

== Usage in Buenos Aires ==
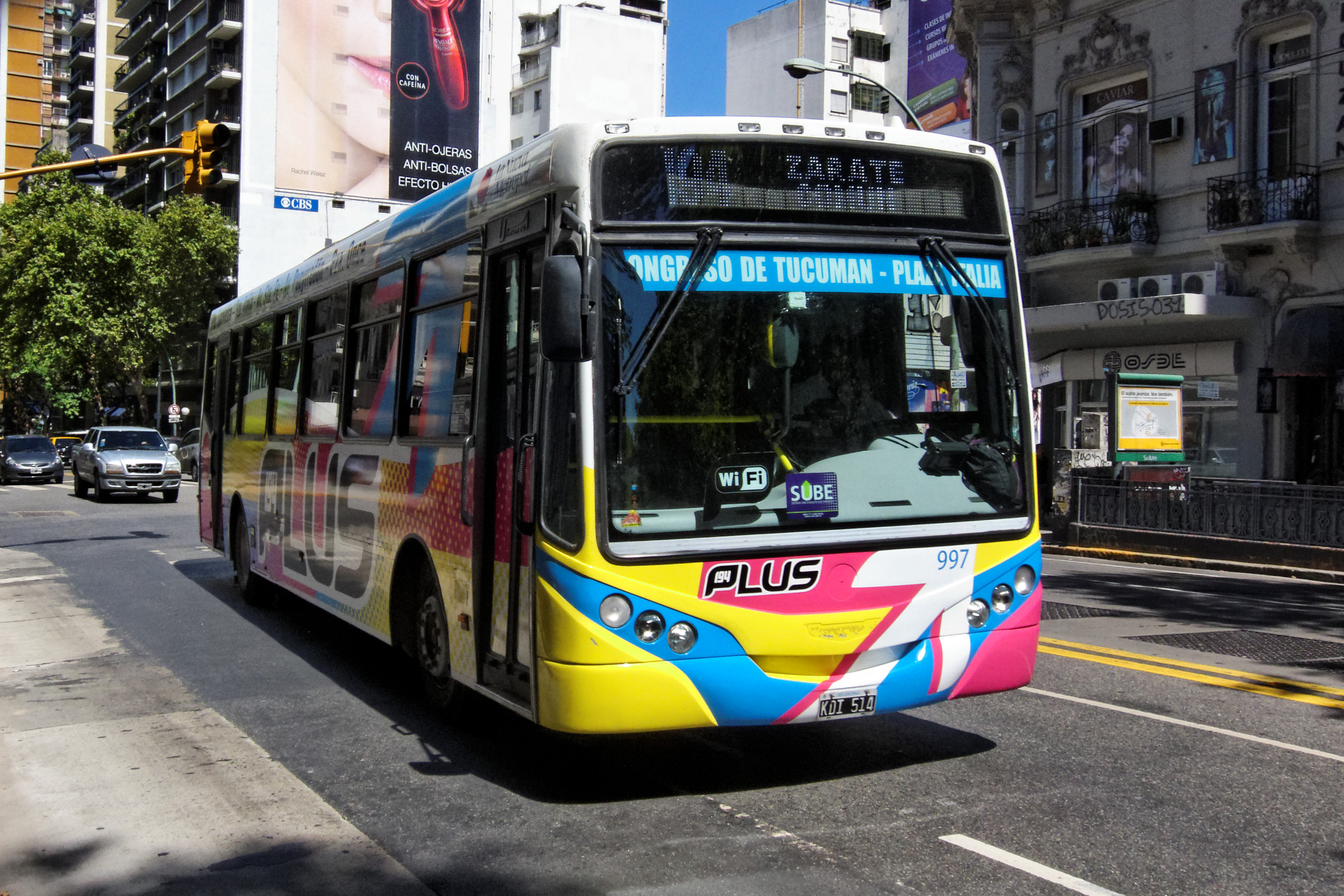
Colectivo line 194 in Buenos Aires

The colectivo bus operations of Buenos Aires provide frequent bus service with little public financial support beyond subsidized petrol.

With low ticket prices, frequent services, and extensive routes, with many places within 400m of a route, the colectivo is a widely used mode of transportation around the city. "Porteños" (Autonomous City of Buenos Aires' residents) have a love-hate relationship with the colectivo: on the one hand, they are usually very crowded in rush hour and may be used by pickpockets, petty thieves, beggars and hawkers (itinerant vendors), though more controlled nowadays. On the other hand, they are a necessity in the city, and a cost-effective form of transportation. Most colectivos in the big cities of Argentina do not have a fixed timetable, but run at least four, and often many more, services per hour, depending on the bus line and time of day. During night-time, all colectivos in Buenos Aires city run through their stops at least twice an hour.

Since December 10, 2015, SUBE card is the only way to pay for trips. It can refilled in drugstores, train and subway (Subte) stations or prefilled in payment cell apps before accreditation in terminals on train, subte and some Metrobus stations.

== In popular culture ==
- The makers of the 1979 motion picture La fiesta de todos, after Argentina's victory in the 1978 FIFA World Cup were forced by the military government to film one of its key stories inside a colectivo.
- One of Argentina's best-remembered soap operas was called Un mundo de 20 asientos ("A 20-seat world") and its main character was a colectivero (colectivo driver).
- Domestically, the colectivo is also called bondi; the word comes from the name of Rio de Janeiro's tramways (bondes), in turn from English bonds, which is how the government paid for the Rio tramway system to the British company that built it.
- The term colectivo came to be used in some neighbouring countries including Paraguay. However, the word can also be found in all other countries in Latin America, particularly Colombia, Peru (as Combi), Chile and Nicaragua.

== See also ==
- Customised buses
- Dala dala
- Jeepney - a similar type of vehicle used in the Philippines
- Matatu - a similar type of vehicle used in some African countries
- Transportation in Argentina
