= Renzo Vespignani =

Italian painter (1924–2001)

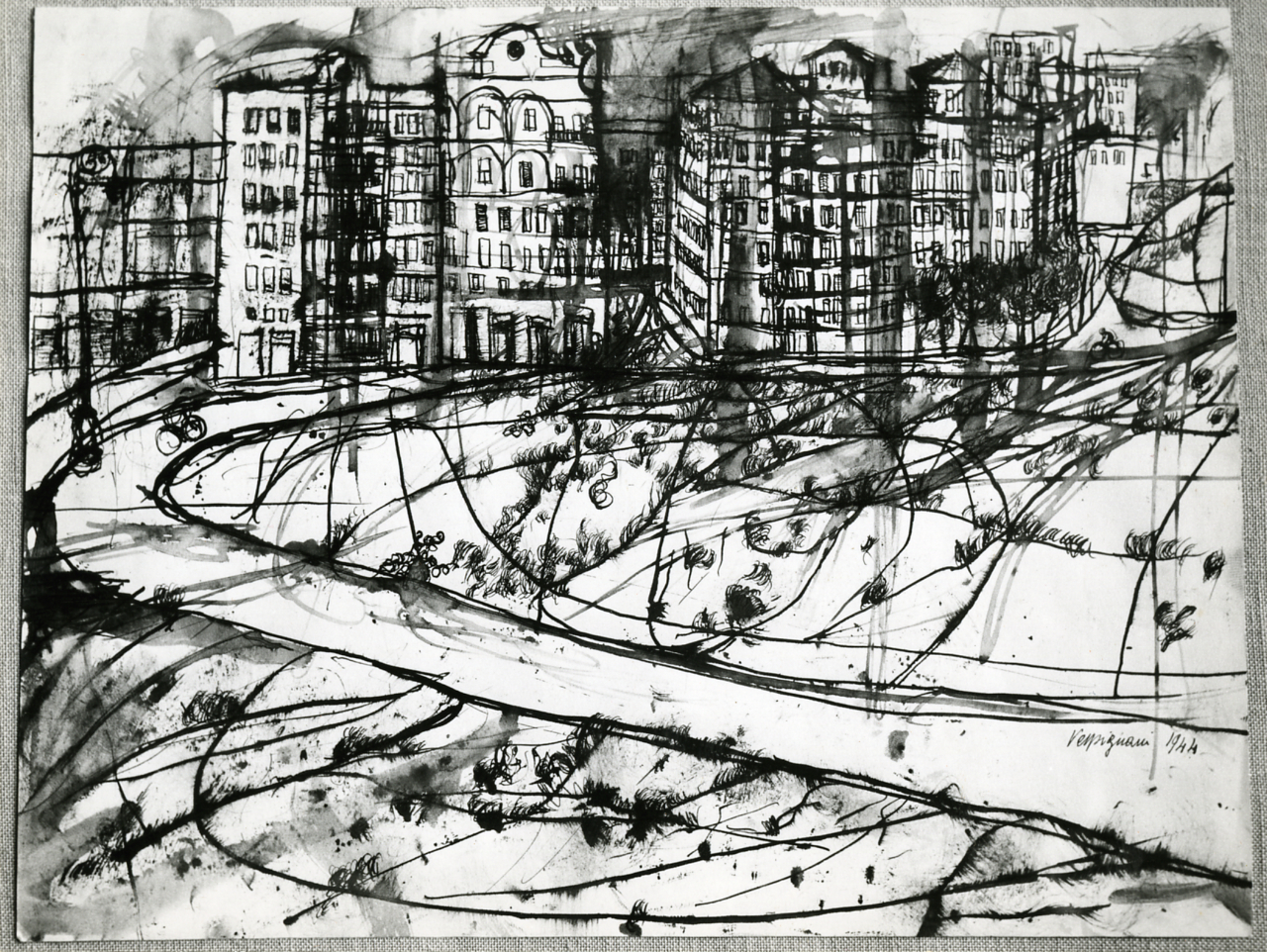
1944 drawing by Renzo Vespignani. Photo by Paolo Monti, 1970 (Fondo Paolo Monti, BEIC).

Renzo Vespignani (1924 - 26 April 2001) was an Italian painter, printmaker and illustrator. Vespignani illustrated the works of Boccaccio, Kafka and T. S. Eliot, among others. In 1956, he co-founded the magazine Citta Aperta ("Open City") and in 1963, co-founded the group II Pro e II Contro (Pro and Con) for neorealism in figure art.

== Life and work ==
Renzo Vespignani was born in Rome, Italy in 1924, and he grew up in a Roman working-class suburb named Portonaccio. He began to paint during the difficult years of the German occupation of Rome, hiding himself at Lino Bianchi Barriviera’s residence.

His drawings in 1944 recorded the ravages of German-occupied Rome in realistic detail. Those images, often likened to German Expressionist works, were featured in his first solo exhibition at Rome's Galleria La Margherita in 1945. Meanwhile, he collaborated as a designer with many political-literary reviews done as poetic documentaries, relating to the cinema of Rossellini and Vittorio de Sica.

After the war, Vespignani contributed illustrations to political and literary journals. At New York's Hugo Gallery, his works were introduced to the U.S. in 1948.

In 1956 he co-founded, with other intellectuals, the review Citta Aperta ("City Opened"), a magazine concerning the city culture's problems. At this time, his work had begun to focus on life in the harsh neighborhoods of Rome's periphery, displaying a connection with the films and literature of Italian Neorealism.

In 1963, with the painters, Ferroni, Ennio Calabria, Giuseppe Guerreschi, Piero Guccione, Piero Guccione e Alberto Gianquinto and the art critics Dario Micacchi, Antonio Del Guercio and Morosini, he founded the group Il pro e il Contro (Pro and Con), which immediately became a point of reference for the newborn neo-figures experiments. During the decade of the 1960s, Vespignani and the group sought to develop new critically and intellectually engaged figural art. Vespignani illustrated the works of Boccaccio, Kafka and T. S. Eliot, among others.

Renzo Vespignani exhibited works across Italy and had participated in the Venice Biennale four times. A 1985 exhibition at the French Academy in Rome examined the rapport between Vespignani's work and that of the Neorealist poet and filmmaker Pier Paolo Pasolini.

After the 1970s, Vespignani rarely exhibited abroad, although two bodies of his work from the 1990s, Manhattan Transfer and An Afternoon in Chelsea, had been inspired by visits to New York City.

Renzo Vespignani died on April 26, 2001, while undergoing surgery.

== See also ==
- Expressionism
