= Ennio Calabria =

Italian painter (1937–2024)

- Born: 7 March 1937; Tripoli, Italian Libya
- Died: 1 March 2024 (aged 86); Rome, Italy
- Occupation: Painter

Ennio Calabria (7 March 1937 – 1 March 2024) was an Italian painter and illustrator.

== Life and career ==
Born in Tripoli, Libya, at the time an Italian colony, at young age Calabria moved to Rome, where he graduated from the Accademia di Belle Arti di Roma. In 1958, he held his first solo exhibition at La Felucca gallery in Rome, and one year later he took part in the VIII Rome Quadriennale exhibition, eventually returning in the 1972, 1986 and 1999 editions. In 1963, he co-founded the group "Il pro e il contro" (lit. 'Pro and Con') with some art critics and colleagues, notably Renzo Vespignani. In 1964, he exposed at the Venice Biennale, and between 1974 and 1978 he served as a member of its board of directors. Beyond painting, Calabria illustrated books and posters, notably the poster of Luca Ronconi's Orlando Furioso.

Calabria was an artist influenced by Marxist aesthetics, and the main focus of his works were labourers, working environments and social changes. He was also a portrait painter, and among his better known works were a series of portraits of Pope John Paul II he made between 2002 and 2005, and Ritratti politici, a series of portraits of historical political figures. He died in Rome on 1 March 2024, at the age of 86.
