= Jorge Muscia =

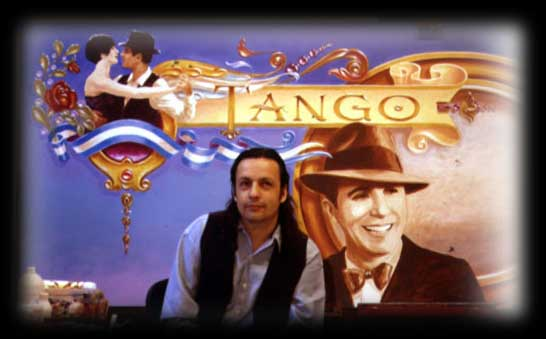
Jorge Muscia and his work Gardel Mito del Tango (Gardel, a Tango Myth). Acrylic on board (detail) 1.50 m × 2.50 m 1996

Jorge Muscia (born March 6, 1958, in Buenos Aires) is a plastic artist and ‘fileteado’ instructor with over 30 years of experience in his field. Muscia, also known as the Fileteador of Tango, distinguishes himself for being a force in the revival of this old style of painting and for being a renowned instructor and promoter of the art of the filete in Argentina and the world.

Regarding his work, both tango [Jorge Muscia, pintor y escultor, ha realizado una amplísima obra, también en Europa, ya considerado verdadero Maestro de este arte hermano plástico del Tango. Horacio Ferrer, poeta e historiador, para Oratorio Carlos Gardel, 1990.] historians as well as art ['El fileteado sacó carta de ciudadanía Argentina en el Abasto porteño. Allí se subió a carros, camiones y colectivos hasta llegar al museo. Jorge Muscia es responsible de este ingreso triunfal que tiene pocos antecedentes de reconocimiento similares...Ana Batistozzi, critica de arte. Nota “Ciudadano Argentino", diario Clarín, suplemento de arte, 16 de septiembre de 1995.]critics hail him as one of the most notable heirs of this popular Argentine painting tradition. Index

== Academic Studies ==
He started studying painting and sculpture in 1976 at the National School of Fine Arts in Argentina, specializing in fileteado porteño (Buenos Aires’ fileteado style) with filete master teacher León Untroib. He also studied diverse international popular arts and ornamental styles, and since 1989 started conducting extensive research in art styles in Italy, Spain, France, England, United States, Mexico, Russia and China.

== Tango and fileteado ==
Tango and fileteado are closely related, therefore Muscia participated in several projects where both art forms intersected; he was also a pioneer in integrating the fileteado art into areas in which this type of art had not been seen before. Due to his commendable contribution to Buenos Aires's popular arts, he was appointed Head Professor at the Academia Nacional del Tango de la República Argentina [Argentina's National Tango Academy], position which he has continuously held since 1990.

== Teaching and publications ==
In 1995 Muscia publishes "El Filete Porteño, Arte Popular de Buenos Aires", [The filete porteño: Popular Buenos Aires Art ] Spanish-English Edition. This was the first fileteado instruction book published and it was launched simultaneously in Argentina and in The US. This book was sponsored by the Fondo Nacional de las Artes [National Arts Fund] and by the National Tango Academy of the Argentine Republic, and it was declared by the Buenos Aires City Council as a book of cultural relevance. (Regulation 49.554. 1995). Since the 1980s and to this date, Muscia has held seminars, conferences, lectures, demonstrations, exhibits, and has appeared in newspaper articles and TV segments with the purpose of promoting the fileteado art in Argentina and the world. Since 1995 he has been a professor at the Liceo Superior del Tango [Superior Tango Academy] in the course "El Tango y las artes plásticas" [Tango and Plastic Arts].

== In the art field ==
He has presented individual and collective exhibits in Argentina. Since 1984 and sponsored by the Chancellorship of Argentina, he has exhibited his work in art galleries and cultural centers in Europe –London, Berlin, Barcelona, Toulouse, among others, and in Mexico and The US, a fact which according to critics has helped to legitimize the fileteado as a means of artistic expression. He has received several awards, including a Scholarship of the Fundacion Antorchas for Artistic Creativity (1992) for his Project Tótems Porteños (Resignificación del Obelisco de Buenos Aires). [Porteño Totem, reinterpretation of the Buenos Aires Obelisc] His works may be found in many prívate collections in Argentina and the world, and in several museums, amongst which we may mention: Museo de la Ciudad [City's Museum], Museo Manoblanca [Manoblanca Museum], Museo Cultural del Tango [Tango Culture Museum], Museo Mujica Lainez [Mujica Lainez Museum], Museo Agustín Lara [Agustin Lara Museum], Museo Mundial del Tango [World Tango Museum], Mairie de Toulouse Museum, Museo Expo Shanghai [Expo Shanghai Museum], Museo Pallarols [Pallarols Museum], etc. In the last few years he has also done body art painting performances as well as urban art presentations in different parts of the world: Moscow, Paris, Barcelona, Toulouse, Rome, and Shanghai, among other cities. His mural and picture restoration work must also be noted. Amongst others: Cupula of Mother Mary the Savior Church, in La Reja. Buenos Aires Masonic Temple. Coliseo Podestá Theater in the city of La Plata. Argentine Nation Government House. (Pink House) Two murals honoring Discepolo at the Line H, Corrientes Subway Station in Buenos Aires. Ceilings at Pallarols Museum in Buenos Aires. Other important acknowledgements include:

- 1995 Honor Diploma from the city of Toulouse, France.
- 2005 poet Horacio Ferrer dedicates to him the tango called "El Fileteador". With music by Master Raúl Garello it is part of the "Diálogos de Poeta y Bandoneón" CD.
