= Fileteado =

Argentine tradition of embellishment

Filete porteño in Buenos Aires, a traditional painting technique
- UNESCO Intangible Cultural Heritage
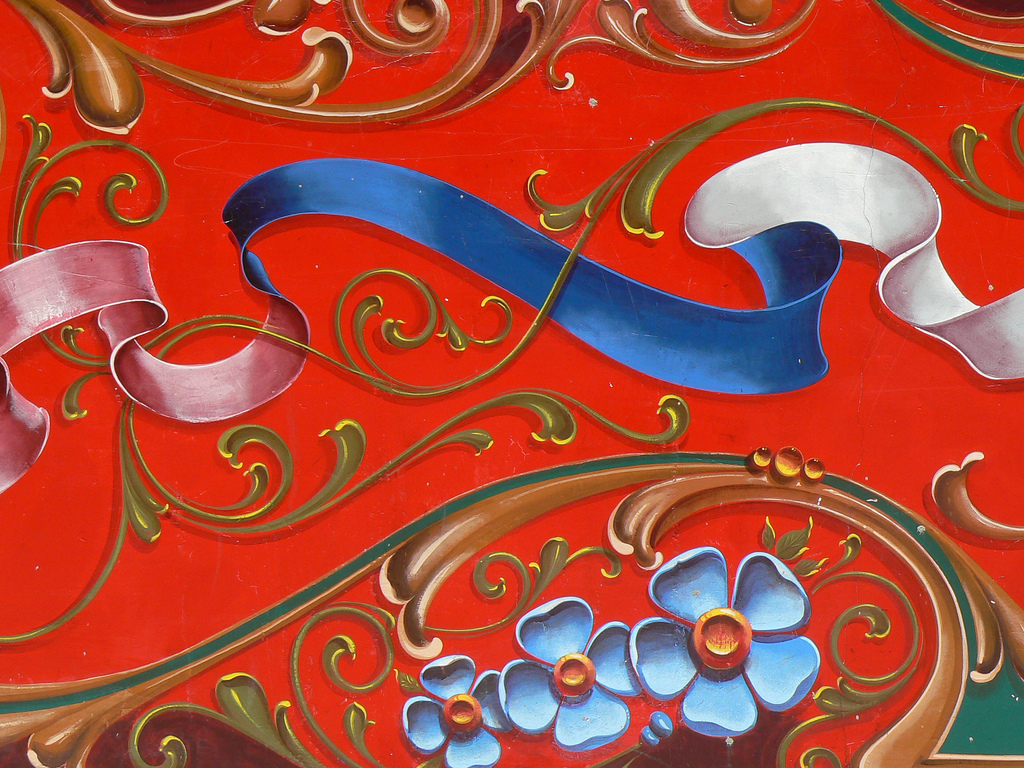
- Detail of a filete
- Country: Argentina
- Reference: 1069
- Region: Latin America and the Caribbean

Inscription history
- Inscription: 2015 (10th session)
- List: Representative

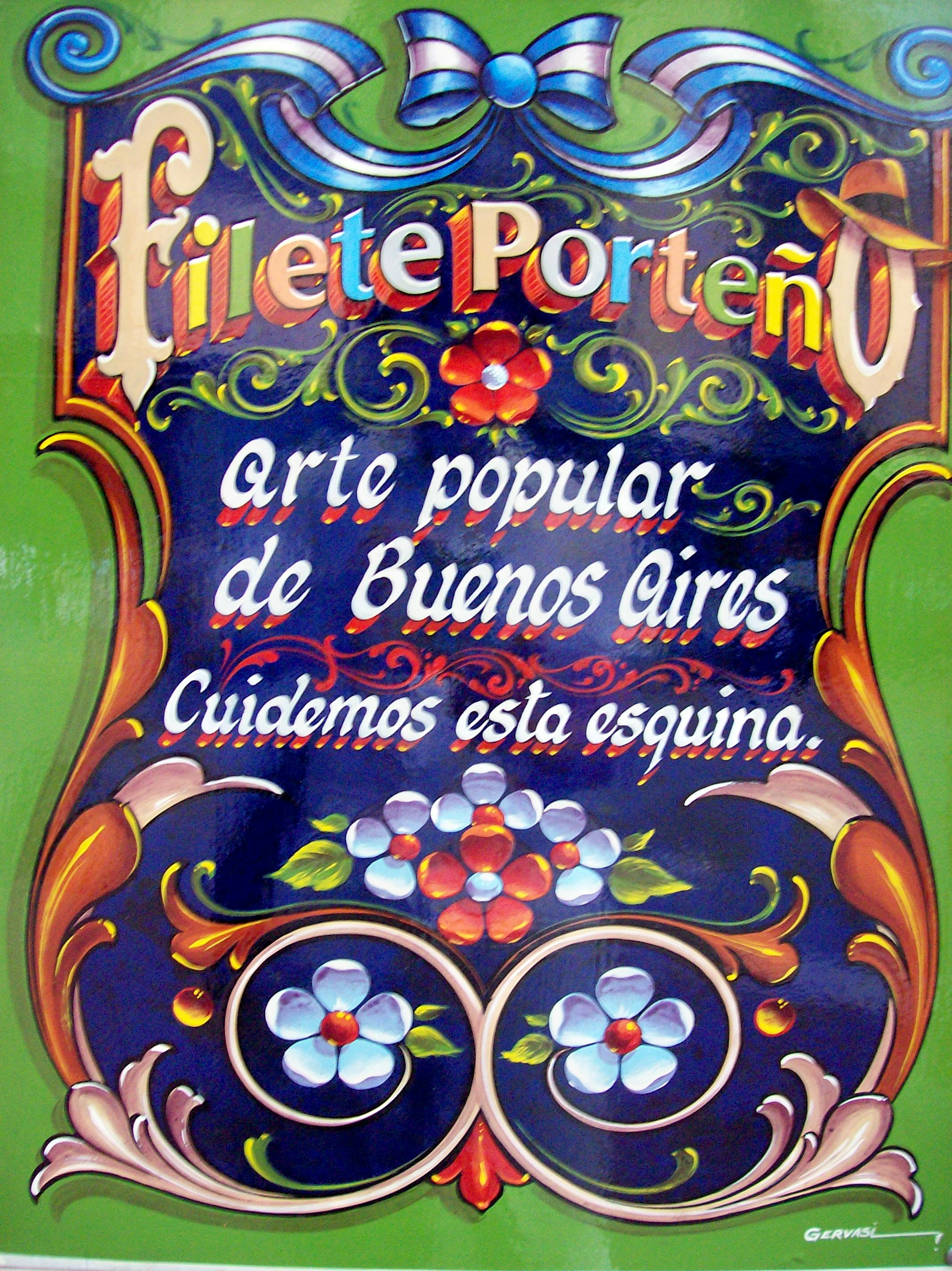
A self-referencing example of the art form.

Fileteado (Spanish pronunciation: [fileteˈaðo]) is a type of artistic drawing and lettering, with stylised lines and flowered, climbing plants, typically used in Buenos Aires, Argentina. It is used to adorn all kinds of beloved objects: signs, taxis, trucks, and even old colectivos, Buenos Aires's buses.

Filetes (the lines in fileteado style) are usually full of colored ornaments and symmetries completed with poetic phrases, sayings and aphorisms, both humorous or roguish, emotional or philosophical. They have been part of the culture of Porteños (inhabitants of Buenos Aires) since the beginning of the 20th century.

The filetes were born as simple ornaments, becoming an emblematic form of art for the city. Many of its initiators were European immigrants, who brought from Europe some elements of what later fileteado, which became the distinct Argentine art form known today when mixed with local traditional art styles. Fileteado was recognized as a unique art after 1970, when it was exhibited for the first time.

== History ==
Fileteado began in the gray carts pulled by horses, that transported fruits, milk, groceries and bread at the end of the 19th century.

The painters who decorated the carts were called Fileteadores, because they performed the job with long-threaded paintbrushes also called "Brushes for making filetes". This is a word derived from Latin "Filum" which means "Thread", referring to the art in a fine line that serves as ornament.

Since it was something that was executed after a cart was done, but before the payment was received, it was a task that had to be performed quickly.

At that time, many specialist painters flourished such as Ernesto Magiori and Pepe Aguado or artists such as Miguel Venturo, son of Salvador Venturo. This last one had been a captain of the Merchant Navy of Italy who established in Buenos Aires, where he dedicated to Fileteado, incorporating a lot of motifs from his home country. Miguel studied painting and enhanced his father's technique, being considered by many the painter who shaped the Filete. The introduction of birds, flowers, diamonds and dragons in the motifs is attributed to him, as well as the design of letters in the doors of trucks. Since there was a tax imposed on large letters, Miguel made smaller ones surrounded by very colorful and complex designs to draw attention, a long lasting design.

== Main formal features ==
In the book Filete porteño, by Alfredo Genovese, the anthropologist Norberto Cirio describes the main formal features from fileteado as:

1. A high degree of stylization
2. The preponderance of lively colors
3. The use of shading and highlighting to create the illusion of depth
4. The preferred use of a Gothic font style or highly detailed letters
5. The almost obsessive recurrence of symmetry
6. The framing of each composition when it is finished
7. The efficient use of available space
8. The symbolic conceptualization of many of the images represented (the horseshoe as a symbol of good luck, the dragon as a symbol of strength).

== Gallery ==
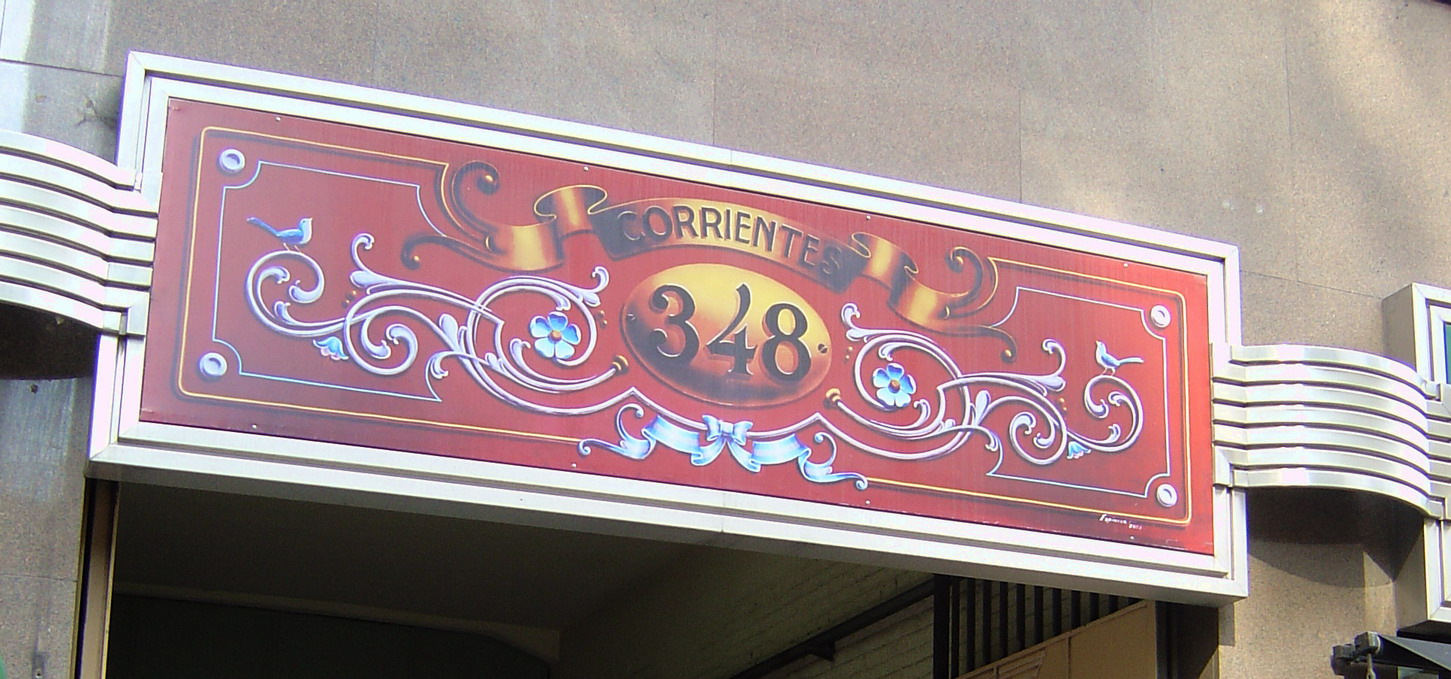
Street sign at Corrientes Avenue 348

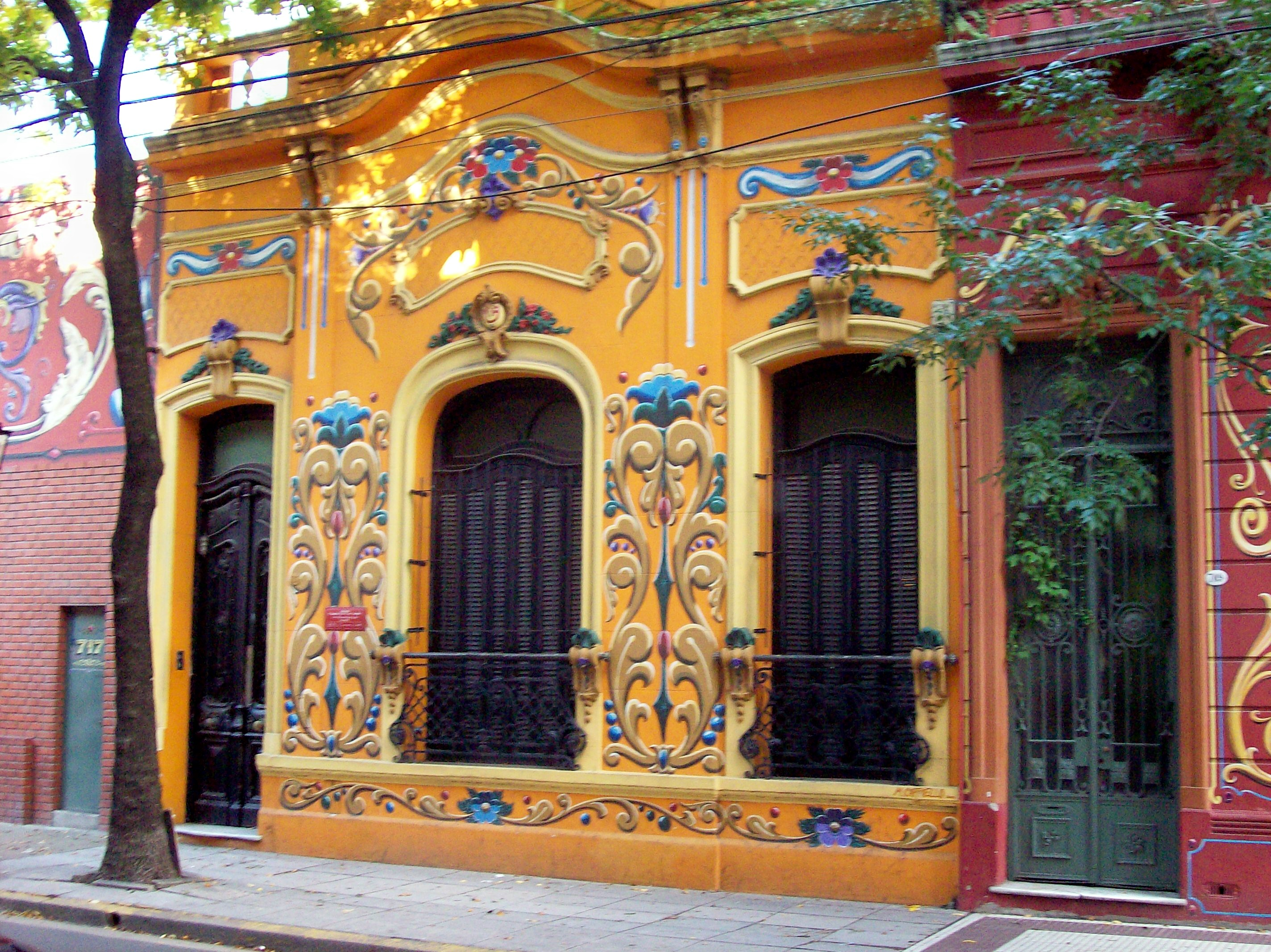
House on Jean Jaures street

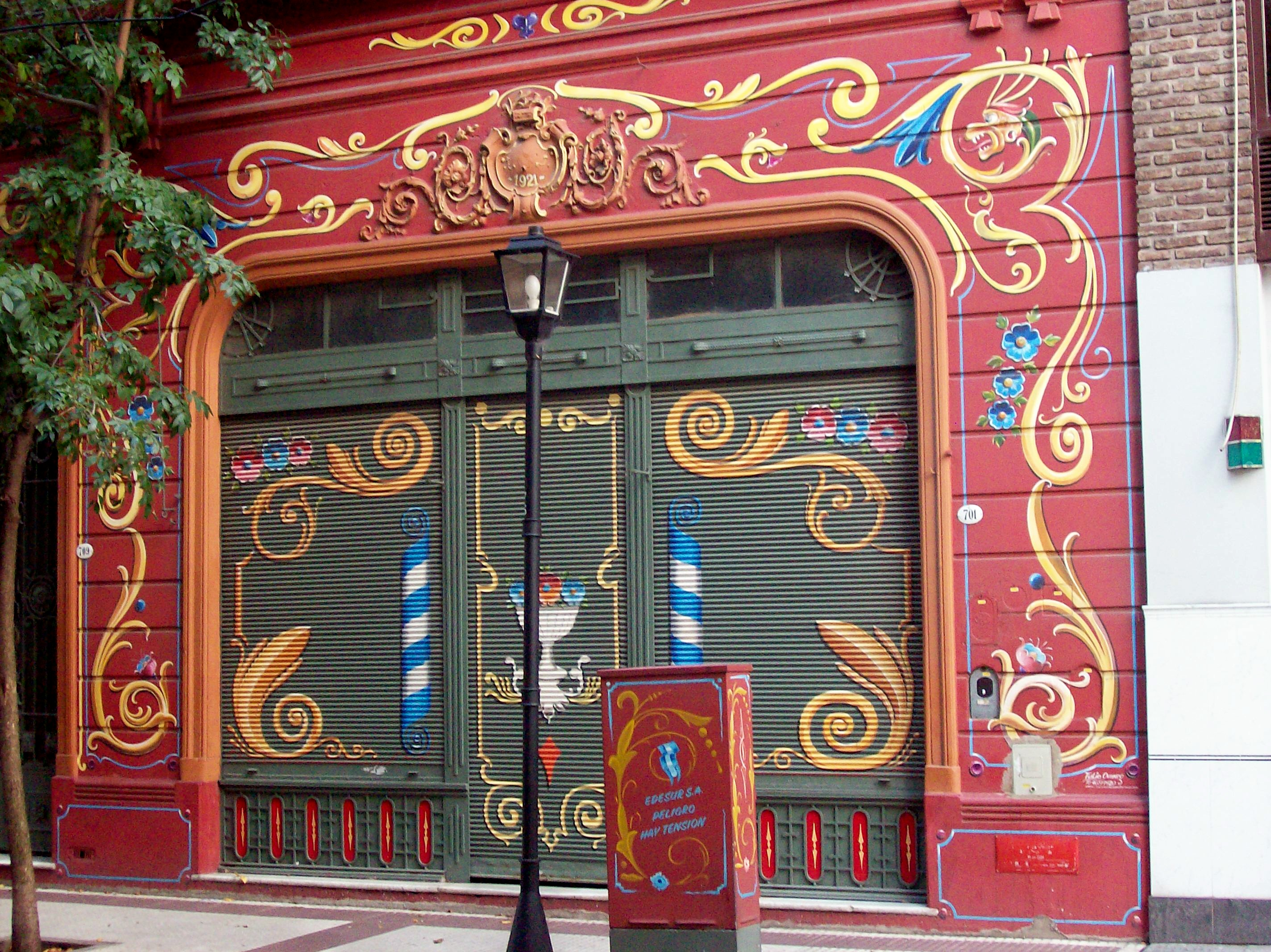
Shop on Jean Jaures street

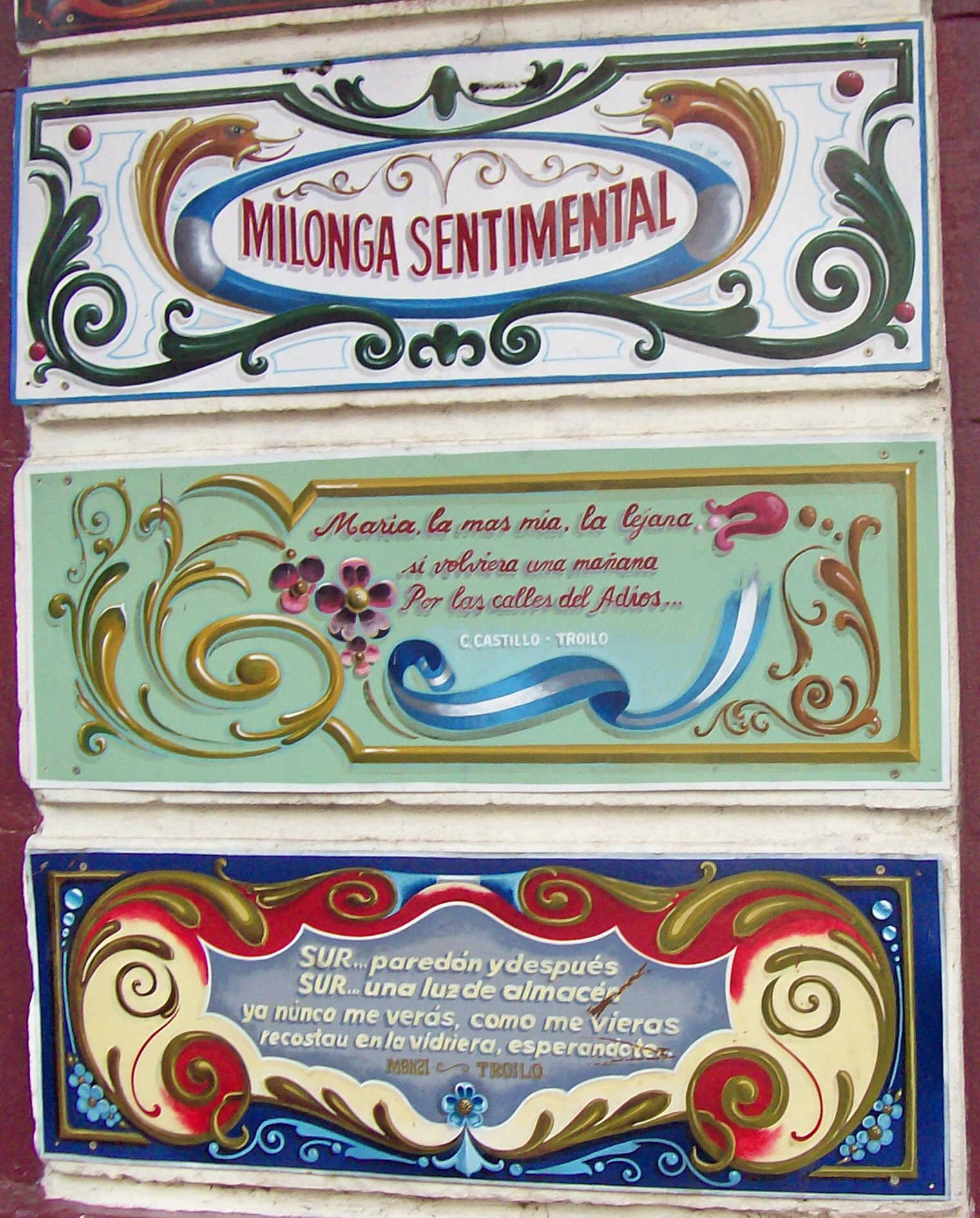
Phrases with fileteado Abasto neighbourhood

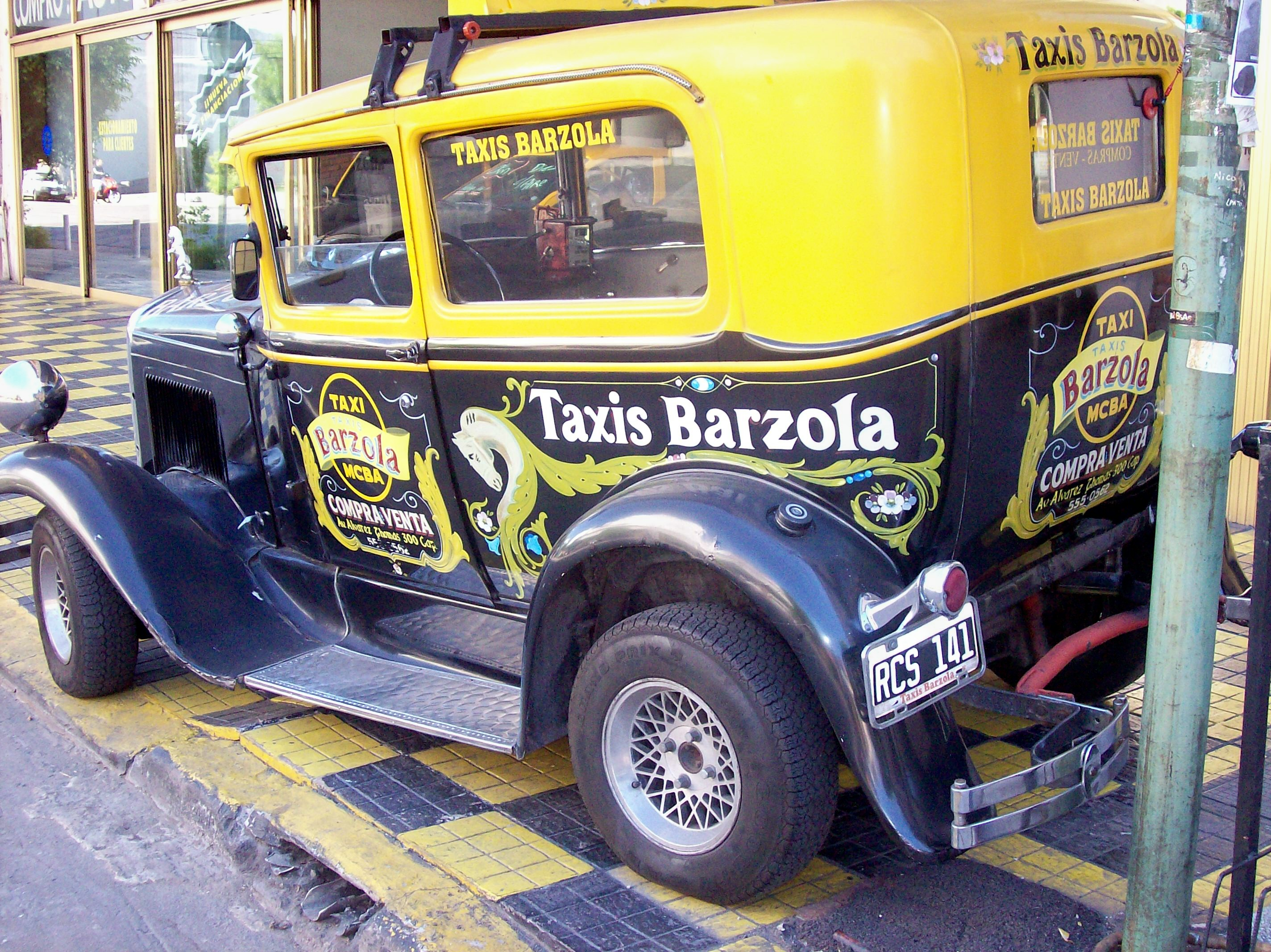
Old-timer taxi with fileteado

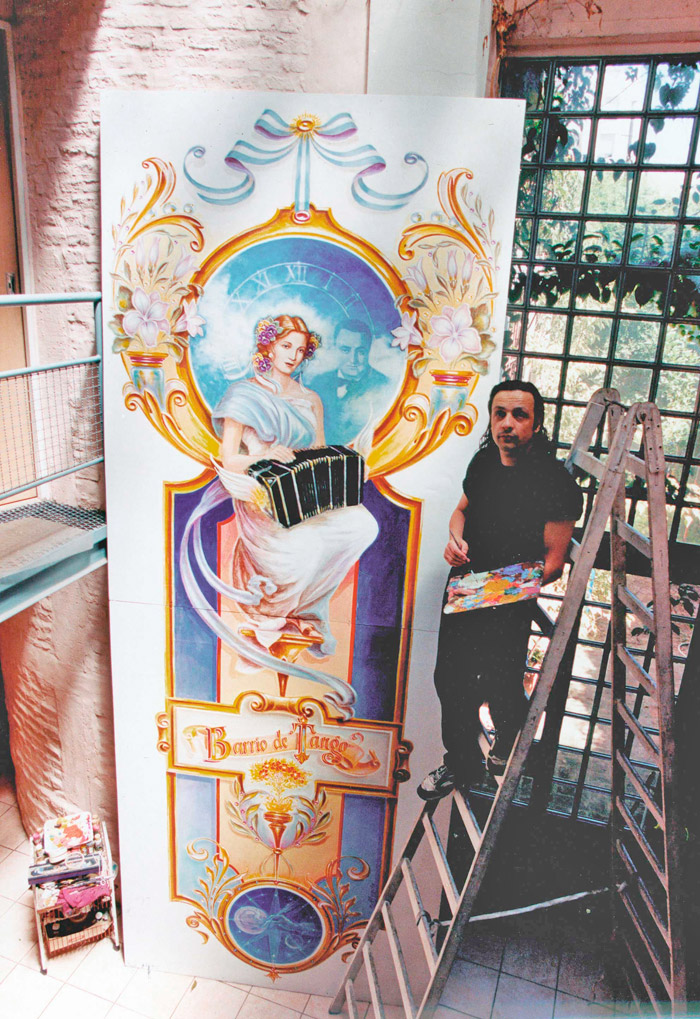
Mural painting, by Jorge Muscia (1998)

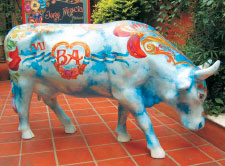
Vaca Fileteada for the Cow Parade, by Jorge Muscia (2006)

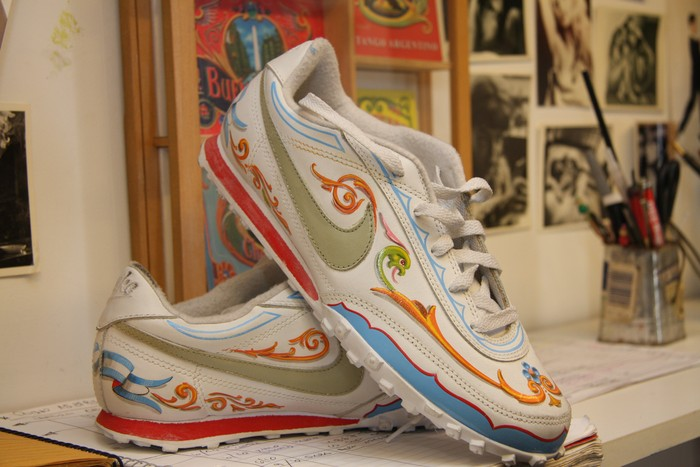
Intervened shoes

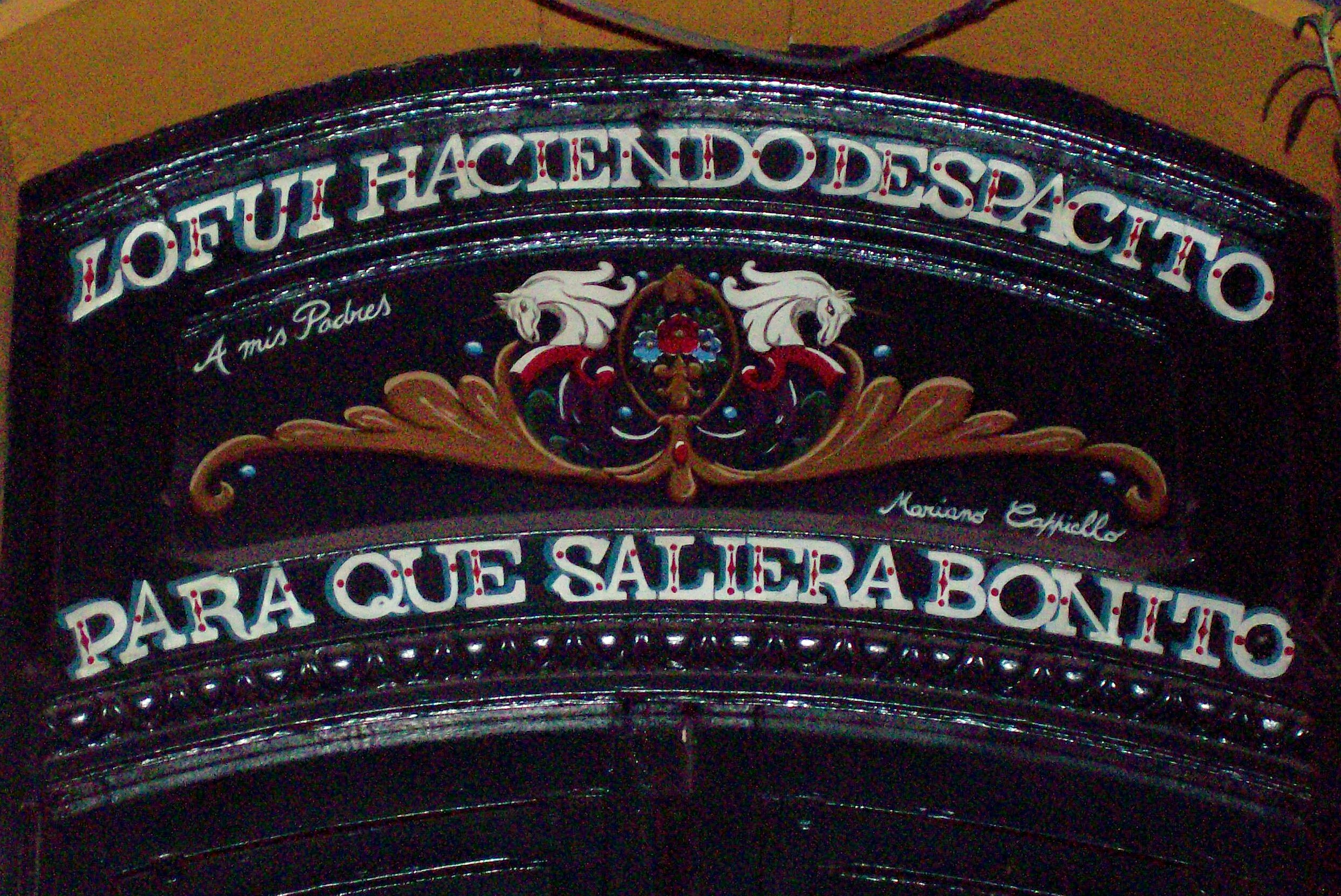
An example of fileteado lettering, reading «Lo fui haciendo despacito para que saliera bonito», meaning, “I took my time while making it so it would come out nice.”

For a modern example of its use, see the cover of the 2005 album Haughty Melodic by Mike Doughty.
