= Ferroni =

Ferroni is an Italian surname. Notable people with the surname include:

- Egisto Ferroni (1835–1912), Italian painter
- Giorgio Ferroni (1908–1981), Italian film director, film editor and screenwriter
- Giovanni Tommasi Ferroni (born 1967), Italian magic realism artist specializing in fantasy painting
- Girolamo Ferroni (1687–c. 1730), Italian painter and engraver
- Leonel Ferroni (born 1996), Argentine footballer
- Nicole Ferroni (born 1982), French comedian, actress, columnist in France Inter and former biology teacher
- Violante Ferroni (1720–...), Italian painter

== See also ==
- Palazzo Spini-Ferroni, Florence
