= Giovanni Tommasi Ferroni =

Italian artist (born 1967)

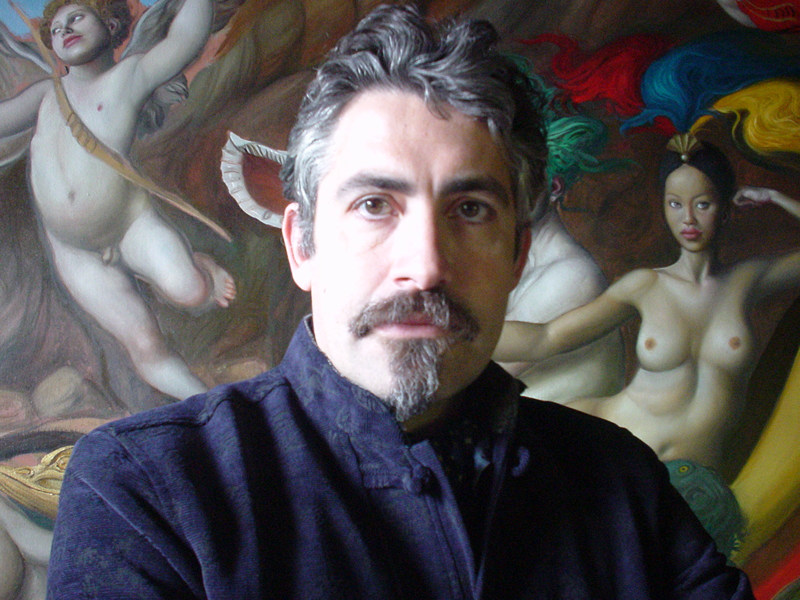
- Giovanni Tommasi Ferroni
- Born: November 12, 1967 (age 58); Rome, Italy
- Education: Sapienza University of Rome
- Occupation: Artist
- Website: www.giovannitommasiferroni.com

Giovanni Tommasi Ferroni (born November 12, 1967, in Rome) is an Italian magic realism artist specializing in fantasy painting.

== Biography ==
Ferroni was born into a family of Tuscan artists, including his father Riccardo, grandfather Leone, and uncle Marcello from Pietrasanta. Ferroni's sister Elena was also a painter with whom Ferroni held joint exhibitions early on in his career.

In 1986, after graduating high school, he joined his father's atelier and studied at the Rome University 'La Sapienza'. His paintings depict a fantasy world that is inhabited by all kinds of mythological, historical and contemporary creatures.

== Exhibitions ==
- 1989 Galleria AMG, Alassio (Italy)
- 1991 Galleria Il Gabbiano, Rome (Italy)
- 1995 Galleria L´Indicatore, Rome
- 1997 Group exhibition European Figurative Art Steltman Galleries, Amsterdam
- 1997 Steltman Galleries, Amsterdam
- 1997 Galleria Il Gabbiano, Rome
- 1998 Steltman Galleries, New York
- 1998 Steltman Galleries, Amsterdam
- 2000 Steltman Galleries, Amsterdam
- 2002 Museo Sandro Parmeggiani, Ferrara (Italy)
- 2002 Steltman Galleries, Amsterdam
- 2003 Steltman Galleries, Amsterdam
- 2004 Galerie Il Tempietto, Brindisi
- 2005 Steltman Galleries, Amsterdam
- 2006 February - March, Jan van der Togt Museum, Amstelveen
- 2006 April, Gallery Davico, Torino
- 2007 Museo Sandro Parmeggiani, Ferrara (Italy)
- 2007 Tecna, Milaan (Italy)
- 2007 Palazzo Antinori 'Per ... Bacco', Florence (Italy)
- 2007 Censa (Italy)
- 2007 August, Mongolia
- 2007 Steltman Galleries, Amsterdam
- 2011 Selective Art Paris
