= Girolamo Ferroni =

Italian painter (1687–1730)

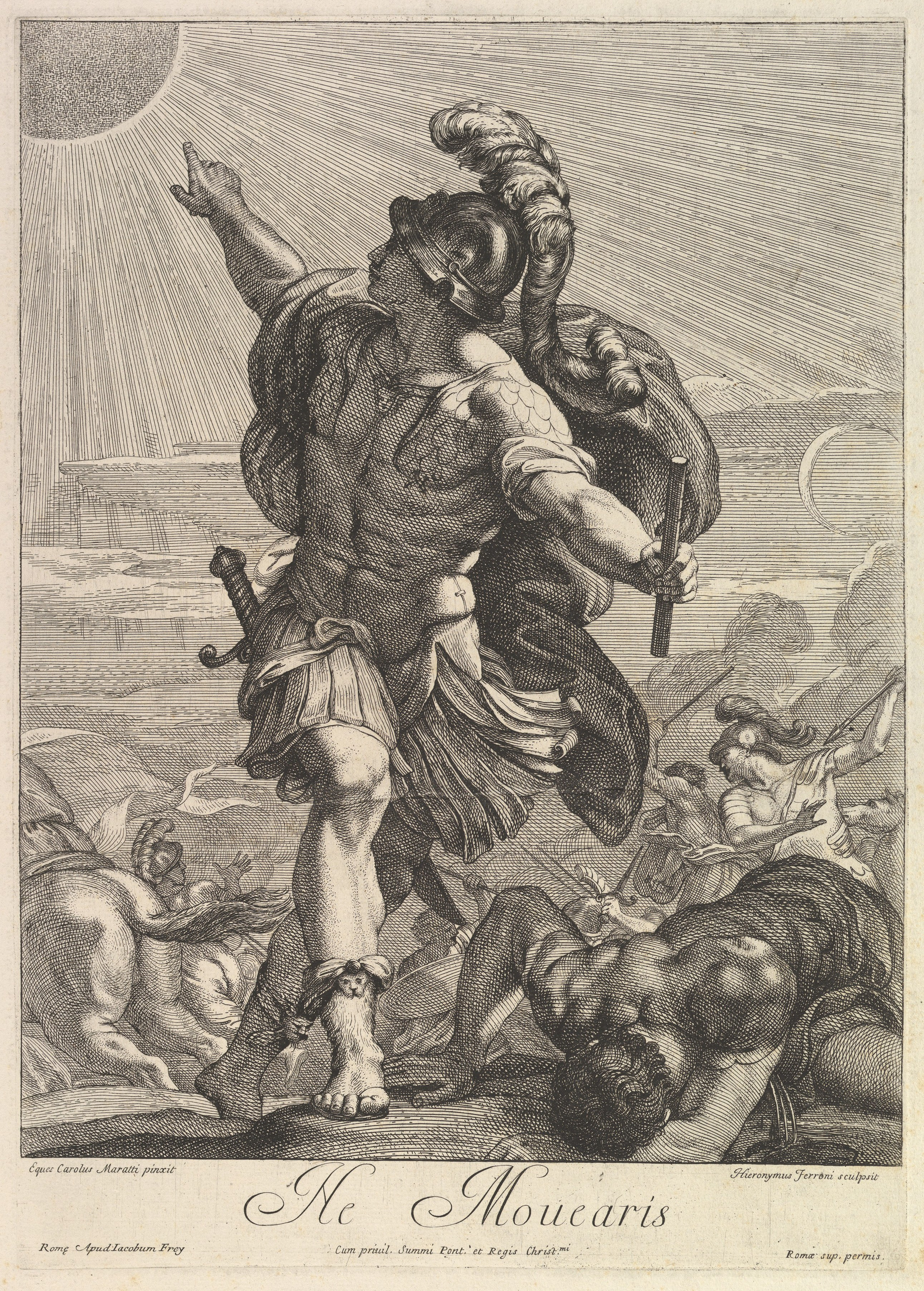
Joshua commanding the sun to stand still, Girolamo Ferroni, after Carlo Maratta.

Girolamo ( Latin: Hieronymus) Ferroni (Milan, 1687 – c. 1730), born in the Duchy of Milan during Spanish rule, was a painter and engraver mainly active in the cities of Milan and Rome. Having learnt the art of painting in Milan, he moved to Rome where he trained in the workshop of the Marche painter Carlo Maratta. Returning to Milan, he painted the Dormition of St Joseph in Sant'Eustorgio and other works of more than mediocre workmanship.

When his work as a painter was finished, he devoted himself to the art of etching, producing works for Maratta including: Joshua commanding the sun to stand still; Deborah singing in triumph having defeated Sisera; Jael killing Sisara; Judith cutting off the head of Holofernes; and the chastity of St Joseph.

Together with Johann Georg Seiller he contributed to the copperplate illustrations in Serviliano Latuada's Descrizione di Milano.
